= Lisztomania (disambiguation) =

Lisztomania was the intense fan frenzy directed toward Franz Liszt during his performances.

Lisztomania may also refer to:

- Lisztomania (film), a 1975 film by Ken Russell, about Franz Liszt
  - Lisztomania (album), a soundtrack album from the film, by Rick Wakeman
- "Lisztomania" (song), a song by Phoenix

== See also ==
- Liszt (disambiguation)
- Mania (disambiguation)
- List of manias
