= List (surname) =

List or Liste is a European surname hailing from German meaning "Border", "Edge", or "Strip of Land" Notable people with the surname include:

== List ==
- Benjamin List (born 1968), German chemist who won the 2021 Nobel Prize in Chemistry with David MacMillan
- Friedrich List (1789–1846), German economist
- George Harold List (1911–2008), American ethnomusicologist, musician and educator
- Garrett List (1943–2019), American trombonist
- Guido von List (1848–1919), Austrian/German writer and occultist
- Helmut List (born 1941), Austrian engineer and philanthropist
- Herbert List (1903–1975), German photographer
- John List (1925–2008), American murderer
- Liesbeth List (1941–2020), Dutch singer
- Luke List, multiple people
- Maximilian List (1910–c.1980), German SS concentration camp commandant
- Paul List (1887–1954), British-based Russian Jewish chess player
- Peyton List, multiple people
- Spencer List (born 2006), American actor and twin of Peyton List
- Wilhelm List (1880–1971), German WW2 field marshal

== Liste ==
- Betty Liste (born 1958), American jazz pianist

== Counts of Alba de Liste ==
- Enrique Enríquez de Mendoza, 1st count of Alba de Liste, title granted by Henry IV of Castile in 1459
- Diego Enríquez de Guzmán (~1530–1604), 5th count of Alba de Liste
- Luis Enríquez de Guzmán, 9th Count of Alba de Liste (~1605–1661)
- Diego Pacheco Téllez-Girón Gómez de Sandoval (1754–1811), 18th count of Alba de Liste

== See also ==
- Liszt (disambiguation)
