= Ewelina Hańska =

Polish noblewoman, Honoré de Balzac's wife (c. 1805–1882)

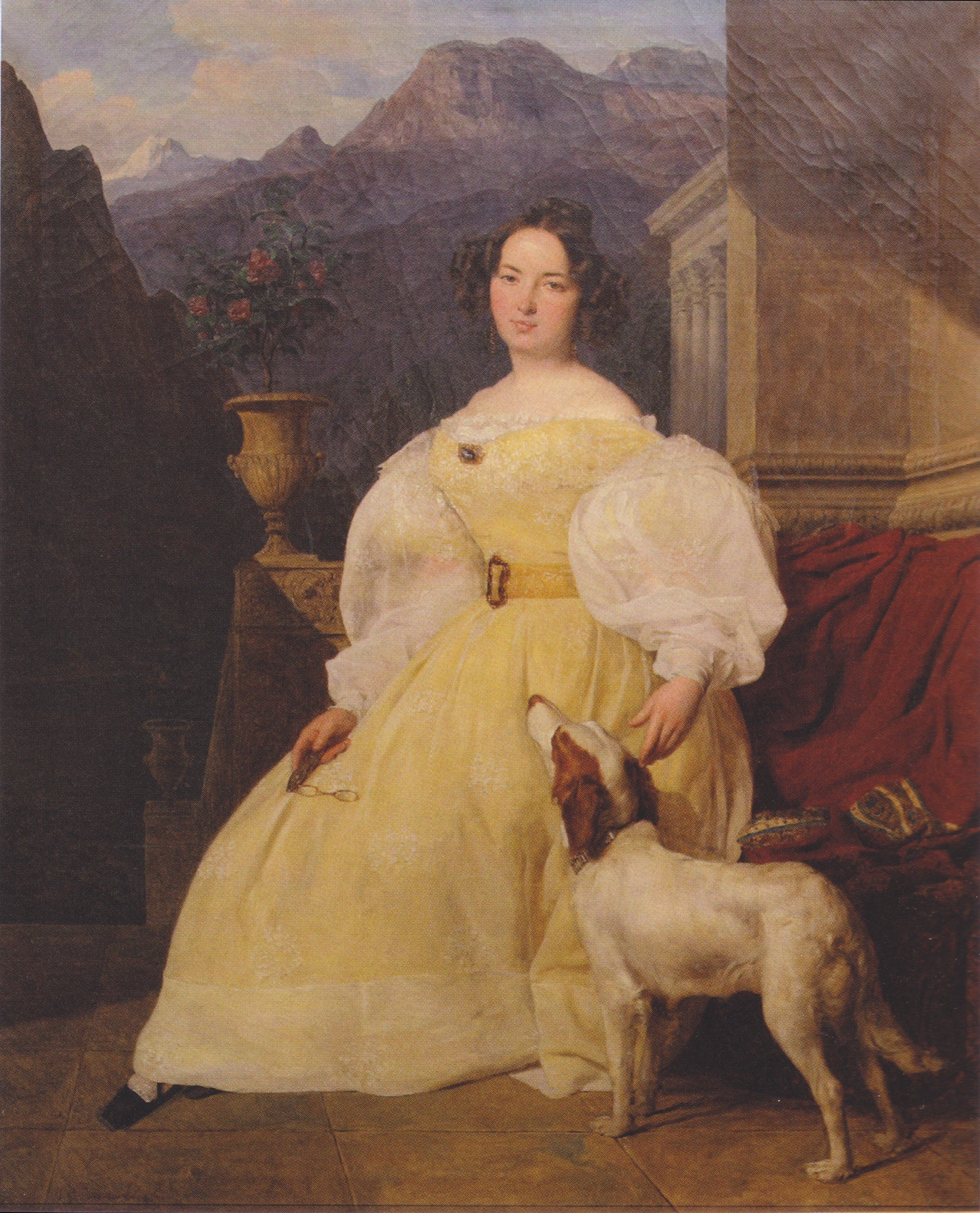
- Portrait by Ferdinand Georg Waldmüller, 1835
- Coat of arms: Krzywda
- Born: Ewelina Rzewuska c. 6 January 1805; Pohrebyshche, Russian Empire
- Died: 11 April 1882 (aged 77); Paris, France
- Buried: Père Lachaise Cemetery
- Family: Rzewuski (by birth); Hański (by marriage); Balzac (by marriage)
- Husband: Wacław Hański (died 1841); Honoré de Balzac (m. 1850; died 1850)
- Issue: Anna Hańska
- Father: Adam Wawrzyniec Rzewuski
- Mother: Justyna Rdułtowska h. Drogosław

Eveline Hańska (née Ewelina Rzewuska; 6 January c. 1805 – 11 April 1882) was a Polish noblewoman best known for her marriage to French novelist Honoré de Balzac. Born at the Wierzchownia estate in Volhynia (now Ukraine), Hańska married landowner Wacław Hański when she was a teenager. Hański, who was about 20 years her senior, suffered from depression. They had five children, but only a daughter, Anna, survived.

In the late 1820s, Hańska began reading Balzac's novels, and in 1832, she sent him an anonymous letter. This began a decades-long correspondence in which Hańska and Balzac expressed a deep mutual affection. In 1833, they met for the first time, in Switzerland. Soon afterward he began writing the novel Séraphîta, which includes a character based on Hańska.

After her husband died in 1841, a series of complications obstructed Hańska's marriage to Balzac. Chief of these was the estate and her daughter Anna's inheritance, both of which might be threatened if she married him. Anna married a Polish count, easing some of the pressure. About the same time, Hańska gave Balzac the idea for his 1844 novel Modeste Mignon. In 1850 they finally married, and moved to Paris, but he died six months later. Though she never remarried, she took several lovers, and died in 1882.

== Biography ==
=== Family and early life ===
Hańska was the fourth of seven children born to Count Adam Wawrzyniec Rzewuski (1760-1825) and his wife, Justyna Rdułtowska (1775-1836). The House of Rzewuski was established as Polish nobility, known for wealth and military prowess. One ancestor had imprisoned his own mother in a tower to extract his part of an inheritance. Hańska's great-grandfather, Wacław Rzewuski, was a famous writer and a Grand Crown Hetman. When the Russian Empire gained control of lands owned by the family through the Partitions of Poland at the end of the 18th century, Rzewuski swore his allegiance to Catherine II. He was rewarded with a comfortable position in the ranks of the empire. Moving between assignments in Kiev, St. Petersburg, and elsewhere, he chose as his primary residence the village of Pohrebyszcze in the region of Vinnytsia.

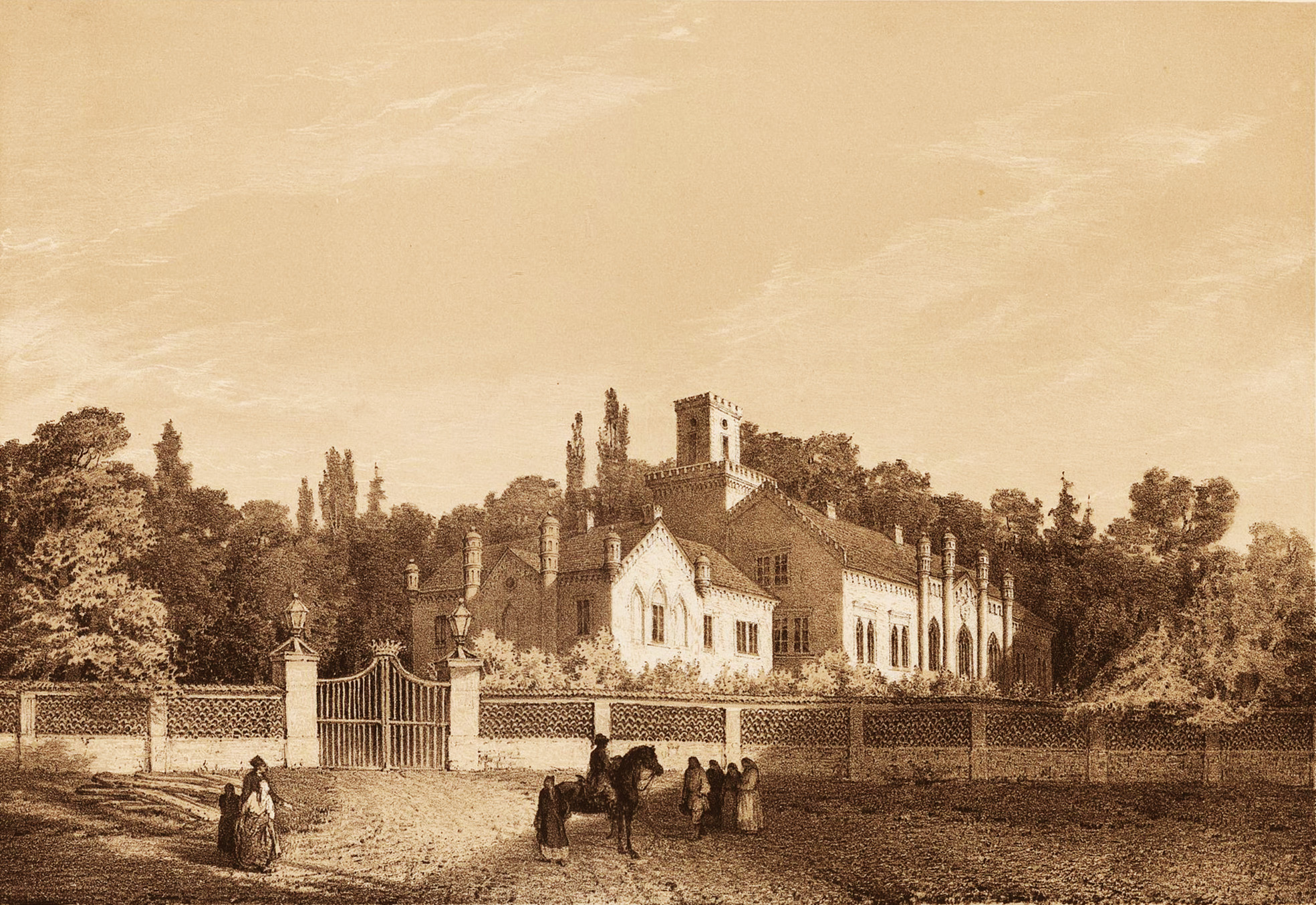
One historian compares the Rzewuski estate in Pohrebysche to "a little kingdom".

She was born in the Pohrebyszcze castle, in the Kiev Governorate of Russian partition of Poland. Although scholars agree that Hańska was born on 6 January, the year is disputed. Her biographers and those of Balzac offer conflicting evidence of her age, taken from correspondence, family records, and testimonies from descendants. Most estimates range between 1801 and 1806. Balzac's biographer Graham Robb writes: "Balzac chose 1806 as her date of birth and he was probably right." Roger Pierrot's 1999 biography of Hańska, however, contends that she was born in 1804. Polish Biographical Dictionary gives 24 December 1805 (Julian) which converts to 5 January 1806 (Gregorian).

Like her brothers and sisters, Hańska was educated by her parents about family lineage and religion. Her mother was a devout Catholic, but her father also taught the children about Voltairian rationality. The family was secluded in Pohrebyszcze, with only occasional trips away. Once a year, the family visited Kiev for a market gathering, during which Rzewuski sold grain and her mother purchased clothing and supplies for the estate.

Ewelina had three brothers: Adam, Ernest and Henryk, and three sisters: Alina, Karolina (better known as Karolina Sobańska) and Paulina. Hańska was closest to her brother Henryk, who later became famous for his work in the genre of Polish folk literature known as gawęda szlachecka. They shared a passion for philosophical discussions, especially related to love and religion. Hańska's other brothers, Adam and Ernest, both pursued military careers. Hańska's eldest sister, Karolina, was admired as a child for her beauty, intellect, and musical talent. She later married a man 34 years her senior, a landowner from Podole named Hieronim Sobański. They separated after two years, and she began a series of passionate affairs with some of her many suitors. These included the Russian general Ivan Ossipovitch Witt, the Polish poet Adam Mickiewicz, and the Russian writer Alexander Pushkin. The Tsar considered her behavior scandalous and declared her dangerously disloyal. As a result, Hańska and the other Rzewuski women were watched carefully by police when they visited the Russian capital of St Petersburg. Hańska's younger sisters, Alina and Paulina, married early into comfortable upper-class families. Alina married a wealthy landowner from Smilavičy, whose father had gained his fortune by managing property for the Ogiński family. Her nephew Stanisław Moniuszko became a renowned composer. Paulina married a banker from Odessa named Jan Riznič.

=== Marriage to Hański ===
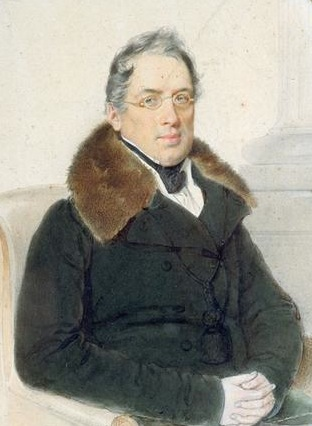
Hańska's first husband Wacław Hański was more than twenty years older than her.

In 1819 Ewelina married Wacław Hański, a noble who lived nearby at Verhivnya (Wierzchownia). Their marriage was a union of wealthy families, not of passion. His estate covered 21,000 acres (85 km^{2}) and owned over 3,000 serfs, including 300 domestic servants. The manor had been designed by a French architect, and its owner filled it with luxuries from around the world: paintings from galleries in Milan and London, dinnerware from China, and a library of 25,000 books in a variety of languages. Hański boasted that none of the furniture was Russian.

Hański was more than 20 years older than Ewelina, who was a teenager at the time of their wedding, and his personality clashed with her youthful vigor. He spent most of the day supervising the grounds, by some accounts with an iron fist. After dinner he was usually too fatigued to spend time with his wife, and retired early. He was generally dour, and lived with a depressed condition that Hańska referred to as "blue devils". Although she was surrounded by opulence, Hańska found herself dissatisfied with her new life and with her husband's emotional distance in particular. As one biographer put it: "He loved Eve but he was not deeply in love with her."

In the first five years of their marriage, Hańska gave birth to five children, four of whom died as infants. The surviving daughter, Anna (b. 1825-30 d. 1915), was a welcome joy to Hańska, and she trusted her care to a young governess named Henriette Borel who had moved to Wierzchownia from the Swiss town of Neuchâtel.

The estate at Wierzchownia was isolated. Hańska was bored by visits to the court at St. Petersburg, and even more bored by noble guests in her own home. She found nothing in common with the ladies of high society, and longed for the stimulating discussions she had enjoyed with her brother Henryk. She spent her time reading the books her husband imported from faraway lands.

=== Becoming "The Stranger" ===
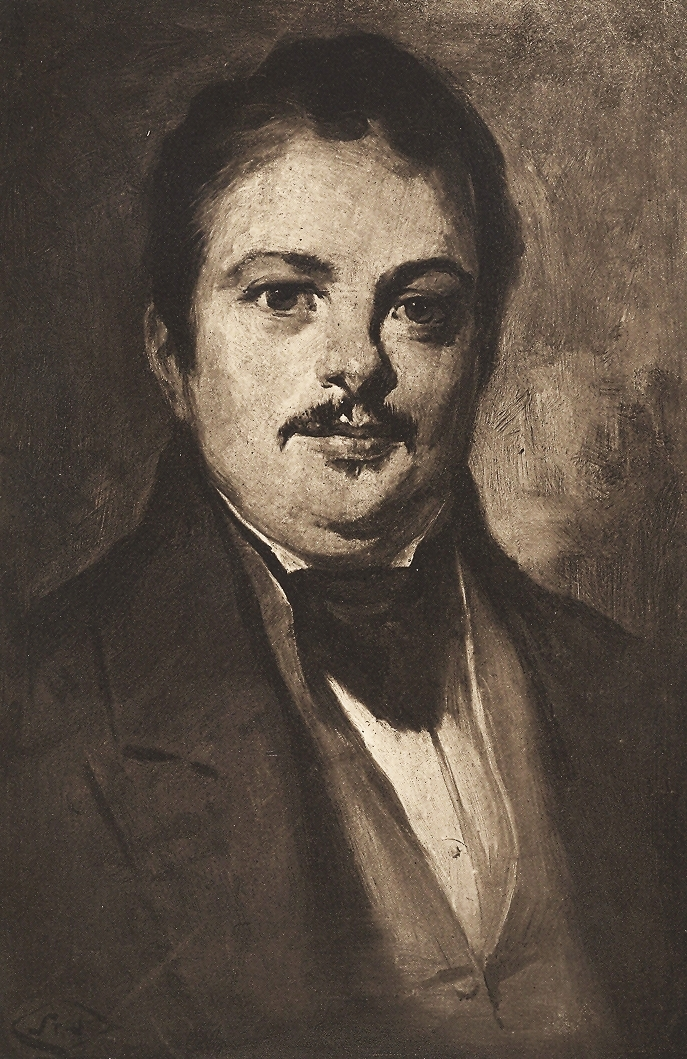
In her November 1832 letter, Hańska told Honoré de Balzac: "My heart has leapt as I read your works."

One of the writers who most enchanted Hańska was the French novelist Honoré de Balzac. After laboring in pseudonymous obscurity for 10 years, Balzac published Les Chouans (The Chouans) in 1829. A tale of star-crossed love amidst a royalist uprising in Brittany, it was the first work to which he signed his own name. Hańska was intrigued by the glowing portrayal of the female protagonist, driven by true love to protect the object of her desire. She also enjoyed Balzac's Physiologie du mariage (The Physiology of Marriage), also published in 1829, which heaps satirical scorn on husbands and celebrates the virtue of married women.

When she read his 1831 novel La Peau de chagrin (The Magic Skin), however, Hańska was appalled by the coarse depiction of Foedora, the so-called "femme sans cœur" ("woman without a heart"). She felt that Balzac had lost the reverence shown in his earlier works, and worried that he had based Foedora on a real woman from his life. Motivated partly by concern, partly by boredom, and partly by a desire to influence the life of a great writer (as her sister Karolina had done), she wrote to Balzac.

On 28 February 1832 Hańska posted a letter from Odessa with no return address. In it, she praised Balzac for his work, but scolded him for the negative portrayal of women in La Peau de chagrin. She urged a return to the glowing representations in his earlier novels, and signed enigmatically: "L'Étrangère" ("The Stranger" or "The Foreigner"). Balzac was intrigued by the letter; he took out a personal advertisement in the Gazette de France indicating his receipt of an anonymous letter and expressing regret for being unable to reply. She probably never saw this notice.

Hańska wrote to Balzac several times during 1832. On 7 November she posted a seven-page letter filled with praise and flattery:

Your soul embraces centuries, Monsieur; its philosophical concepts appear to be the fruit of long study matured by time; yet I am told that you are still young. I would like to know you, but feel that I have no need to do so. I know you through my own spiritual instinct; I picture you in my own way and feel that were I to set eyes upon you I should exclaim, 'That is he!' Your outward semblance probably does not reveal your brilliant imagination; you have to be moved, the sacred fire of genius has to be lit, if you are to show yourself as you really are, and you are what I feel you to be—a man superior in his knowledge of the human heart.

She insisted, however, that they could never meet, and indeed that he should never know her name: ("For you I am The Stranger, and shall remain so all my life.") Still, she wished for him to write back, so she advised him to place a notice in La Quotidienne to "L'É" from "H.B.". He purchased a notice similar to the earlier one in the Gazette, and signed it according to her instructions.

In her next letter Hańska made arrangements for a trusted courier to collect letters from Balzac, and thereby allow for a direct correspondence. Before long she sent him the news that she and her husband would be traveling Europe, and visiting Vienna, Hanski's childhood home. They would also travel to the Swiss village of Neuchâtel, to visit the family of her daughter's governess. Contradicting her vow of eternal anonymity, she suggested a meeting. Balzac agreed immediately, and began to make preparations for the journey. Also, sometime in 1833, Balzac wrote his first confession of love to her, despite being at that time in another relationship.

=== Meeting Balzac ===
In September 1833, after traveling to the French city of Besançon to find cheap paper for a publishing enterprise, Balzac crossed into Switzerland and registered at the Hôtel du Faucon under the name Marquis d'Entragues. He sent word to Hańska that he would visit the garden of the Maison Andrié, where she and her family were staying. He looked up and saw her face at the window, then – as he described it later – he "lost all bodily sensation". They met later that day (25 September) at a spot overlooking Lake Neuchâtel; according to legend, he noticed a woman reading one of his books. He was overwhelmed with her beauty, and she wrote soon afterwards to her brother, describing Balzac as "cheerful and lovable just like you".

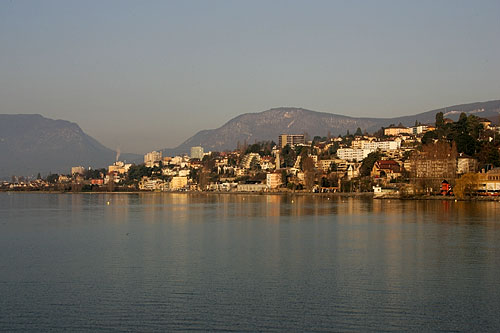
Hańska met Balzac for the first time in the Swiss village of Neuchâtel.

Hańska and Balzac met several times over the next five days, and her husband became enchanted with Balzac as well, inviting him to meals with the family. During a trip to Lake Biel, Hański went to arrange lunch, leaving his wife and Balzac alone. In the shade of a large oak tree, they kissed and exchanged vows of patience and fidelity. She told him of the family's plan to visit Geneva for Christmas; Balzac agreed to visit before the end of the year. Before he left Nauchâtel, she sent a passionate letter to his hotel: "Villain! Did you not see in my eyes all that I longed for? But have no fear, I felt all the desire that a woman in love seeks to provoke".

Arriving in Geneva on 26 December, the Christmas Eve, Balzac stayed at the Auberge de l'Arc, near the Maison Mirabaud where the Hański family had settled for the season. She left a ring for him at the hotel, with a note asking for a new promise of love. He gave it, and described how he began wearing the ring on his left hand, "with which I hold my paper, so that the thought of you clasps me tight." At this time he began working on a philosophical novel, Séraphîta, about a hermaphroditic angel united by the love of a mortal man for a compassionate and sensual woman. Balzac explained that she was his model for the latter. It was clear to all that Hański was in ill health, and Hańska began to think about her future with the French author. In the meantime, she asked Balzac to begin collecting for her autographs of the famous people he spent time with in Paris and elsewhere.

After leaving Geneva on 8 February, the Hański family spent several months visiting the major cities of Italy. In Florence the sculptor Lorenzo Bartolini started work on a bust of Hańska. In the summer of 1834 they returned to Vienna, where they would stay for another year. During this time Balzac continued writing to Hańska, and by accident two especially amorous letters fell into the hands of her husband. He wrote to the French author, furious, and demanded an explanation. Balzac wrote to Hański claiming that it was nothing more than a game: "One evening, in jest, she said to me that she would like to know what a love-letter was. This was said wholly without meaning.... I wrote those two unfortunate letters to Vienna, supposing that she remembered our joke...." Hański apparently accepted the explanation, and invited Balzac to visit them in Vienna, which he did in May 1835.

Balzac's biographers agree that, despite his vows of loyalty to Hańska, he conducted affairs with several women during the 1830s, and may have fathered children with two of them. One was an Englishwoman named Sarah who had married the Count Emilio Guidoboni-Visconti. Hańska wrote to Balzac about these rumors in 1836, and he flatly denied them. Her suspicion was raised again, however, when he later dedicated his novel Béatrix to "Sarah". Balzac also corresponded with Hański; while most of their family disapproved of Balzac, Hański respected him, and the two exchanged letters on literature and agronomy. Meanwhile, Hańska was experiencing a renewal of religious interest, partly because her daughter's governess, Henriette Borel, left to join a nunnery in Paris. Hańska taught her daughter Anna from the works of Christian scholars including Jean Baptiste Massillon and St. François de Sales. Her religious interest was more towards mysticism than mainstream religions; she corresponded with Baroness Barbara von Krüdener, and read on Rosicrucianism, Martinism and Swedenborgianism. Balzac treated this attack of devotion with the sharpest disapproval. When Balzac sent her works in progress, her only replies were moral queries, rather than the stylistic criticism for which he hoped.

=== Hański's death ===
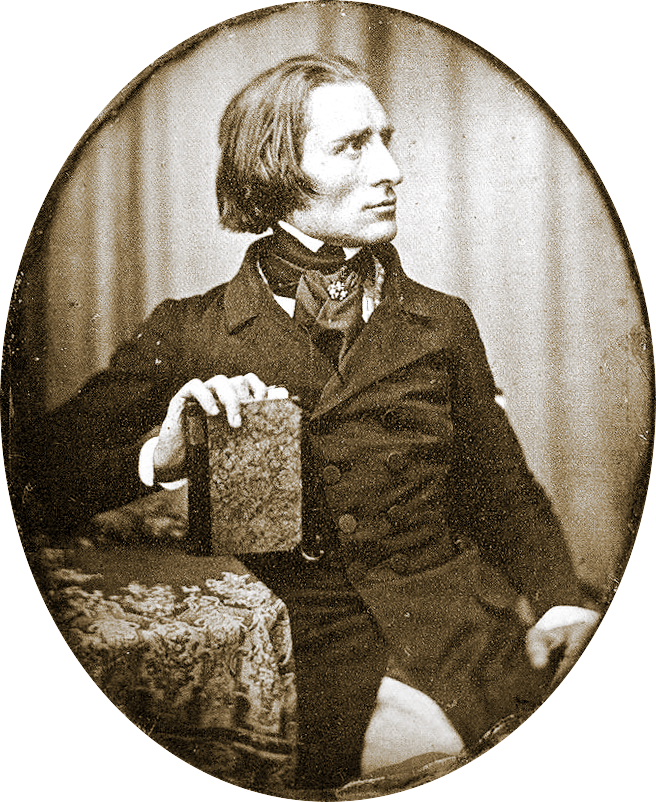
After her first husband's death, Hańska rejected advances from composer Franz Liszt.

Hańska's husband died in November 1841. She sent Balzac a letter, sealed in black, with the news. He instantly wrote back: "je n'en aurais peut-être pas voulu recevoir d'autre de vous, malgré ce que vous me dites de triste sur vous et votre santé" ("I could not perhaps wish to have received any other [news] from you, in spite of the sad things you tell me about yourself and your health"). He made plans to visit Dresden in May, and obtain a visa to visit her in Russia.

The future, however, was not as simple as Balzac wanted to believe. Hańska's family did not approve of the French author; her Aunt Rozalia was especially disdainful. To make matters worse, her late husband's uncle protested Hański's will, which left her the entire estate. Horrified that her daughter would be robbed of everything, Hańska insisted that she must end her relationship with Balzac. "You are free", she wrote to him. As she made plans to protest the uncle's interference in St. Petersburg, Balzac wrote back to offer his help. He suggested that he could become a Russian citizen and "go to the Czar myself and ask him to sanction our marriage". She asked for his patience, which he offered anew.

Soon after she arrived in the Russian capital of St. Petersburg, in order to resolve some of the litigation issues surrounding her inheritance, she took Anna to a recital by the Hungarian composer and pianist Franz Liszt. Although she did not succumb to Lisztomania, she was impressed by his musical talent and his good looks. "He is an extraordinary mixture", she wrote in her diary, "and I enjoy studying him." They saw one another on several occasions, but she ultimately rejected his advances. One biographer says that their last meeting "gives striking evidence of her loyalty to Balzac".

In late July 1843 Balzac visited her in St. Petersburg, the first time they had seen one another in eight years. He was struck by Hańska's resilient beauty, but his condition had deteriorated over the years. Biographers agree that she was much less physically attracted to him at this time. Still they renewed their vows of love and planned to marry as soon as she won her lawsuit. In early October he returned to Paris. Soon afterwards, she wrote a story based on her own experience writing to Balzac for the first time. Unhappy with it, she threw it into the fire, but the French author begged her to rewrite it so he could adapt it. He assured her that she would "know something of the joys of authorship when you see how much of your elegant and delightful writing I have preserved". Her story became Modeste Mignon, Balzac's 1844 novel about a young woman who writes to her favorite poet.

Also in 1844 Hańska won her lawsuit. The wealth of her late husband's estate would go to Anna, who had become engaged to a Polish Count, Jerzy Mniszech. They planned to marry in 1846, after which time Hańska would bestow the inheritance. Thus Hańska's marriage to Balzac would have to wait. In the meantime, two urgent problems began to complicate their plans. One was his health, which had been deteriorating for years. In October 1843 he wrote to her about "horrible suffering which has its seat nowhere; which cannot be described; which attacks both heart and brain". Balzac's other problem was financial: despite his illness, he could not afford to relax his work schedule, since he owed more than 200,000 francs to various creditors.

=== Second marriage and widowhood ===
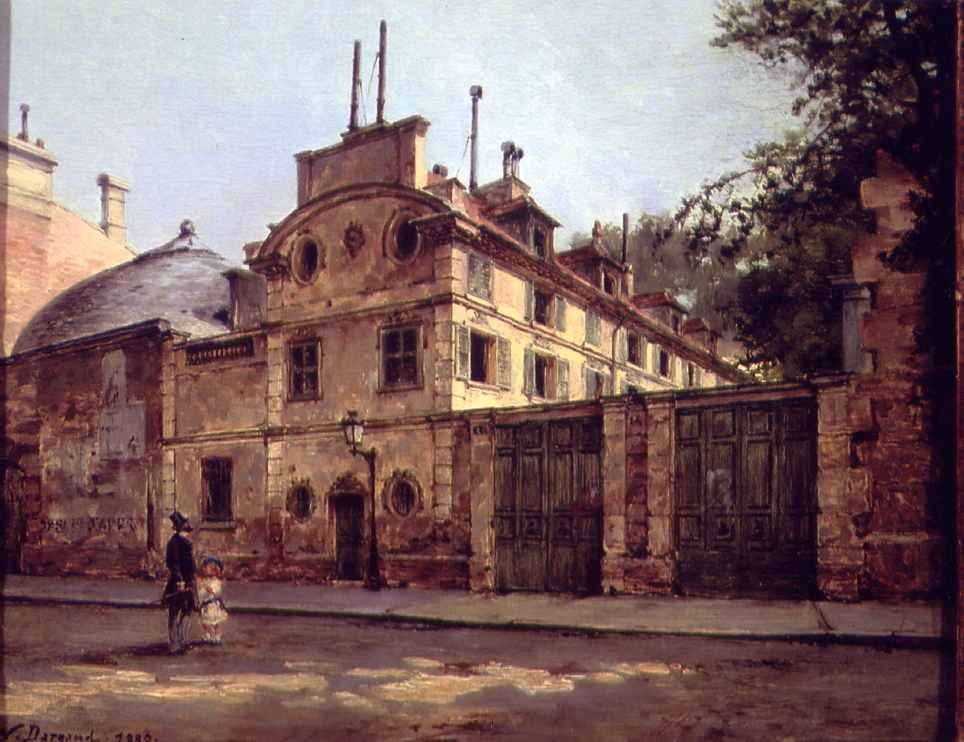
The house Balzac bought for Hańska (with her money) was built before the French Revolution by banker Nicolas Beaujon.

Hańska and Balzac were determined, however, and in 1845 she visited him in Paris with Anna and Jerzy. In April of the following year they visited Italy; Balzac joined them for a tour of Rome, and they proceeded to Geneva. Soon after he returned to Paris, she wrote with the news that she was pregnant. Balzac was overjoyed, certain that they would have a boy, and insisting on the name Victor-Honoré. The thought of having a son, he wrote, "stirs my heart and makes me write page upon page". To avoid scandal, he would have to marry Hańska in secret, to hide the fact that their child was conceived out of wedlock. In the meantime, Anna married Jerzy Mniszech on 13 October in Wiesbaden. Balzac served as a witness and wrote an announcement for the Paris newspapers, which offended Hańska's sister Alina.

Hańska, living for a time in Dresden, was not soothed, either, by Balzac's disregard for financial stability. For years he had planned to buy a house for them to share, but in August 1846 she sent him a stern admonition. Until his debts were paid, she wrote, "we must postpone buying any property". One month later he purchased a house on the Rue Fortunée for 50,000 francs. Having collected finery from his many travels, he searched across Europe for items to properly complete the furnishings: carpets from Smyrna, embroidered pillowcases from Germany, and a handle for the lavatory chain crafted from Bohemian glass.

In November, Hańska suffered a miscarriage; she wrote to Balzac with the tragic news. He wanted to visit her, but Anna wrote asking him to remain in Paris. The emotion involved, she wrote, "would be fatal". Hańska made plans to return to Wierzchownia, but Balzac begged her to visit him, which she did in the spring of 1847. As soon as she was back in Ukraine, however, a new wrinkle unfolded. Hańska had long been unhappy with the presence of Balzac's housekeeper, Louise Breugniot, and he promised to break with her before marrying. He wrote with alarm to Hańska explaining that Breugninot had stolen her letters to him and blackmailed the author for 30,000 francs. Biographers disagree about truth of this story; Robb suggests it was "a convincing hysterical performance put on for the benefit of his jealous fiancée".

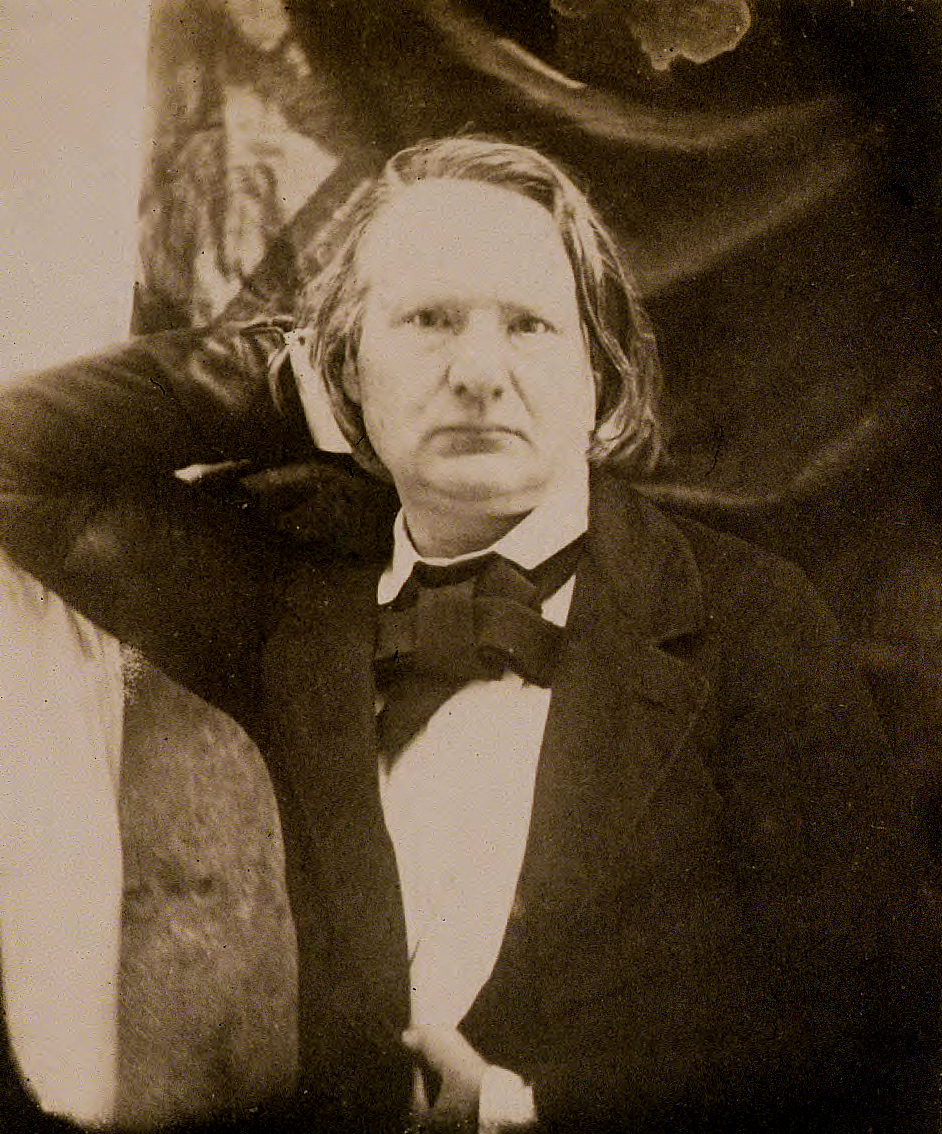
Before Balzac's death, Hańska was visited often by Victor Hugo.

Still, Balzac believed that keeping her letters was dangerous and, in a moment of characteristic impulse, threw them into the fire. He described it to her as "the saddest and most frightful day of my life ... I am looking at the ashes as I write to you, and I tremble seeing how little space fifteen years takes up." On 5 September 1847 he left Paris to join her for the first time in Wierzchownia. They spent several happy months together, but financial obligations required his presence in France. The Revolution of 1848 began one week after his return. Back in Wierzchownia, Hańska lost 80,000 francs due to a granary fire, and her time was consumed with three lawsuits. These complications, and Balzac's constant debt, meant that their finances were unstable, and she hesitated anew at the idea of marriage. In any case, a wedding would be impossible without approval from the Tsar, which he did not grant until spring of 1850. On 2 July 1849 Russian authorities responding to Balzac's request in December 1847 to marry Hańska stated that he could do so, but that Hańska could not keep her land.

Balzac returned to Wierzchownia in October, and immediately fell ill with heart issues. His condition deteriorated throughout 1849, and doubts persisted in her mind about their union. Biographers generally agree that Hańska was convinced by Balzac's frail state and endless devotion. One wrote: "It was charity, as much as love or fame, which finally turned the scale." Robb indicates that the wedding was "surely an act of compassion on her part". To avoid rumors and suspicion from the Tsar, Hańska transferred ownership of the estate to her daughter. On 14 March 1850 they traveled to Berdychiv and, accompanied by Anna and Jerzy, were married in a small ceremony at the parish church of St. Barbara.

Both Hańska and Balzac took ill after the wedding; she suffered from a severe attack of gout, for which her doctor prescribed an unusual treatment: "Every other day she has to thrust her feet into the body of a sucking-pig which has only just been slit open, because it is necessary that the entrails should be quivering." She recovered, but he did not. They returned to Paris in late May, and his health improved slightly at the start of summer. By July, however, he was confined to his bed. Hańska nursed him constantly, as a stream of visitors – including the writers Victor Hugo and Henri Murger – came to pay their respects. When Balzac's vision started to give out, she began to act as his secretary, helping him with his writing.

In mid-August Balzac succumbed to gangrene and began having fits of delirium. At one point he called out for Horace Bianchon, the fictional doctor he had included in many novels. But he also expressed great worry for Hańska, once telling Hugo: "My wife is more intelligent than I, but who will support her in her solitude? I have accustomed her to so much love." He died on 18 August 1850.

As most of Balzac's biographers point out, Hańska was not in the room when he died. Robb says she "must have retired for a moment", while André Maurois notes that she had been by his side for weeks with no way of knowing how long it would continue, and "there was nothing to be done". Vincent Cronin attributes her absence to the nature of their relationship: "From the first day by the lakeside at Neuchâtel theirs had been a Romantic love and Eve wanted to guard it to the end against that terrible taint of corruption."

=== Later years and death ===
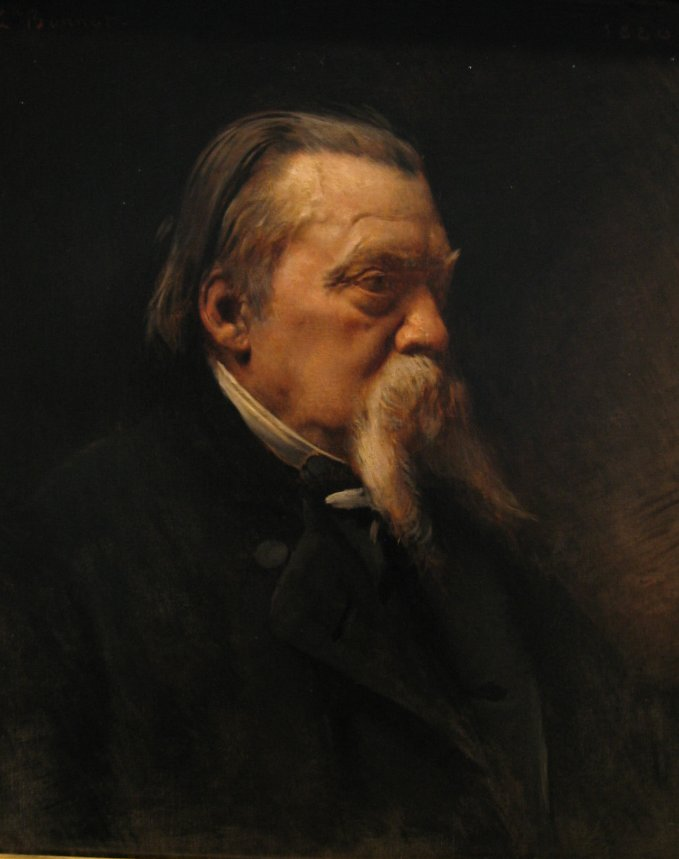
Hańska spent her last thirty years in a relationship with painter Jean Gigoux.

Hańska lived with Balzac's mother for a time after his death, in the house he had spent so much time and expense furnishing. The elder Mme. Balzac moved in with a friend after several months, and Hańska approached the remains of her late husband's writing. Several works had been left incomplete, and publishers inquired about releasing a final edition of his grand collection La Comédie humaine. Hańska sponsored new editions of his works and was involved in editing some of them, even adding occasional content. Balzac's debt, meanwhile, still exceeded 200,000 francs, which Hańska paid while also providing for his mother's living expenses. One of her letters at the time gives voice to her frustrations: "In nursing my husband's incurable malady I ruined my health, just as I have ruined my private fortune in accepting the inheritance of debts and embarrassments which he left me." Anna and Jerzy moved into a nearby house in Paris.

Despite her obligations, Hańska was a beautiful unmarried woman of means living in Paris. The writer Jules Amédée Barbey d'Aurevilly described her this way: "Her beauty was imposing and noble, somewhat massive, a little fleshy, but even in stoutness she retained a very lively charm which was spiced with a delightful foreign accent and a striking hint of sensuality." As she began sorting through Balzac's papers, she called on his friend, Champfleury, for assistance. As they worked one evening, he complained of a headache. "I'll make it go away," she said, and began massaging his forehead. As he wrote later: "There are certain magnetic effluvia, in such situations, of which the effect is that the matter does not stop there." Her affair with the man 20 years her junior was brief, but it provided a tremendous release to Hańska, who had spent decades with older men in various states of ill health. She began partaking of the social life around her. "The night before last I laughed as I have never done before," she wrote in 1851. "Oh, how wonderful it is not to know anyone or have to worry about anyone, to have one's independence, liberty on the mountain-tops, and to be in Paris!"

Champfleury was intimidated by her vitality and jealousy, and removed himself from her life. On his recommendation, she turned creative control of Balzac's unfinished novels Le Député d'Arcis and Les Petits Bourgeois to another writer, Charles Rabou. Rabou added extensively to them and published both books in 1854. To soothe the publisher, Hańska falsely claimed that Balzac had chosen Rabou as his literary successor.

Hańska met the painter Jean Gigoux when she hired him in 1851 to paint Anna's portrait. They began a relationship that lasted many years, but never married. Over the next 30 years, Hańska and particularly her spend-thrift daughter spent the remainder of their fortune on fine clothing and jewelry. Jerzy, her son-in-law, meanwhile, succumbed to mental disorders and died in 1881, leaving behind a trail of debts. Hańska was forced to sell the house, but was allowed to continue living there. She died on 11 April 1882 and was buried in Balzac's grave at Père Lachaise Cemetery.

== Influence on Balzac's works ==
Ewelina was an inspiration for many of Balzac's characters. She can be seen as the model for La Fosseuse, Mme Claes, Modeste Mignon, Ursule Mirouët, Adeline Hulot, and especially Eugénie Grandet and Mme de Mortsauf. There is less agreement among scholars on whether she was also the inspiration for more negative characters such as Foedora and Lady Dudley, as Balzac seems to have used her mostly as a model for more positive personas. His works also mention numerous characters named Eve or Eveline, and have several dedications to her.

In addition to Ewelina, her daughter Anna, sister Alina, aunt Rozalia, first love (Tadeusz Wyleżyński), and several other figures that she introduced Balzac to or told him about, were also incorporated into his works. After they met, Poland, Polish topics, Polish names, and Polish (Slavic) mysticism began to appear much more frequently in his works, as exemplified by such characters as Hoene Wroński, Grabianka and General Chodkiewicz.

== Defenders and detractors ==
Hańska became a controversial figure among the biographers and researchers of Balzac. As Zygmunt Czerny notes, the "mysterious Pole" was criticized by some (Henry Bordeaux, Octave Mirbeau (La Mort de Balzac), Adolf Nowaczyński, Józef Ignacy Kraszewski, Charles Léger and Pierre Descaves), and praised by others (Philippe Bertault, Marcel Bouteron, Barbey d'Aurevilly, Sophie de Korwin-Piotrowska, Tadeusz Boy-Żeleński, Tadeusz Grabowski, Juanita Helm Floyd and André Billy). Czerny notes that one of the "greatest experts on Balzac", Spoelberch de Lovenjoul, referred to her as "one of the best women of the epoch", and that while there are those who deride her influence on Balzac, and question her feelings and motivations, few deny she had a crucial impact on him, and, for most, the "Great Balzac" emerged only after meeting her in early 1830s. Czerny concludes by saying: "However one could analyze her and their relationship, the impact of her love on Balzac was persistent, all-enveloping and decisive".
