= LSST =

LSST may refer to:

- Large Synoptic Survey Telescope, former name of the Vera C. Rubin Observatory astronomical observatory in Chile
  - Legacy Survey of Space and Time, an astronomical survey performed at the Vera C. Rubin Observatory
- Lowstand systems tract, a type of sedimentary deposit in sequence stratigraphy
- The Priory Academy LSST, formerly Lincoln School of Science and Technology, a school in Lincolnshire, England, UK
- Legal Services Support Team, units of the United States Marine Corps Judge Advocate Division

== See also ==
- LST (disambiguation)
- list (disambiguation)
