= List (disambiguation) =

A list is a set of discrete items of information collected and set forth in some format.

List or lists may also refer to:

- List (surname), including a list of people with the name
- List College, of the Jewish Theological Seminary of America
- Angle of list, the degree to which a vessel heels (leans or tilts) to either port or starboard
- List (abstract data type), in computer science
- List on Sylt, previously called List, a municipality in Germany
- List, to designate a listed building in the UK
- Lists, or list field, the arena where a jousting event was held

== See also ==
- The List (disambiguation)
- Listing (disambiguation)
- LST (disambiguation)
- List of lists of lists
- The Book of Lists, an American series of books with unusual lists
- SC Germania List, German rugby union club
- Lisht, Egyptian village south of Cairo
- La Liste, a list of best restaurants
- Liszt (surname)
