= Pohrebyshche =

City in Vinnytsia Oblast, Ukraine

Pohrebyshche Погребище
- City
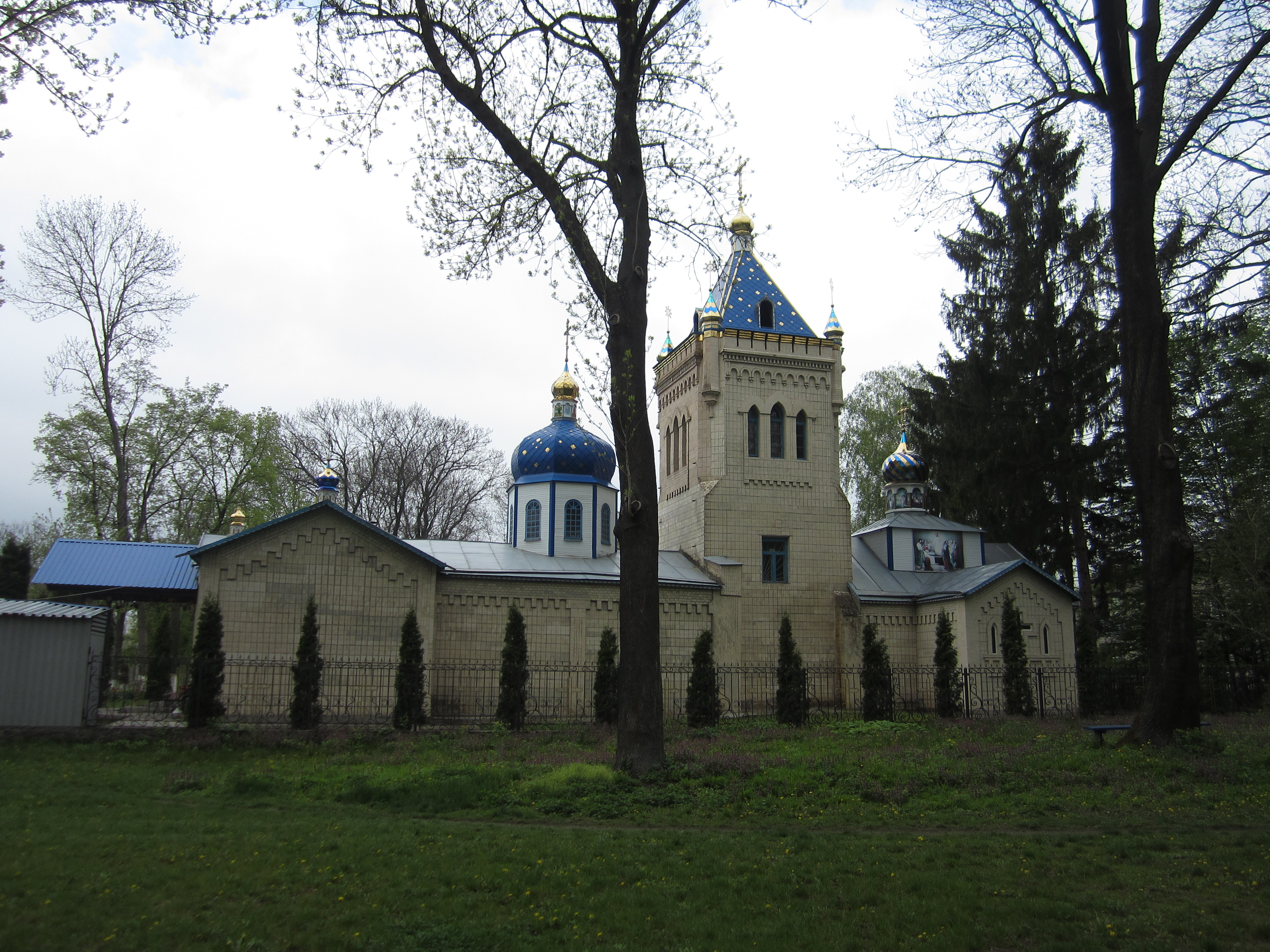
- Former Rzewuski palace in Pohrebyshche (now a church)

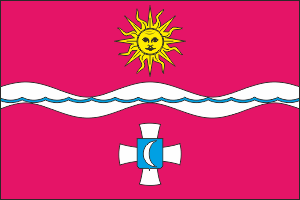
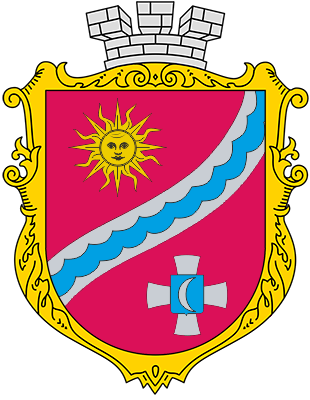
- Flag Coat of arms

- Location of Pohrebyshche Pohrebyshche (Ukraine)
- Coordinates: 49°29′0″N 29°16′0″E
- Country: Ukraine
- Oblast: Vinnytsia Oblast
- Raion: Vinnytsia Raion
- Hromada: Pohrebyshche urban hromada
- First mentioned: 12th century as town of Rokitnya. Become a town in 1938, administrative center in 1984

Population (2022)
  - Total: 9,209
- Postal code: 22200
- Area code: +380 +486

Pohrebyshche (Ukrainian: Погребище [poɦreˈbɪʃtʃe]) is a small city in Vinnytsia Oblast, Ukraine. It served as the administrative center of Pohrebyshche Raion (district) until its abolishment in 2020, when it was incorporated into Vinnytsia Raion. Pohrebyshche is situated near the sources of the Ros River. Population: 9,209 (2022 estimate).

== Names ==
Pohrebyshche has many names in other languages: Polish: Pohrebyszcze, Russian: Погребище Pogrebischtsche or Pogrebishchye or Pogrebishche, Yiddish: פרהאבישטא Prhobisht.

== History ==
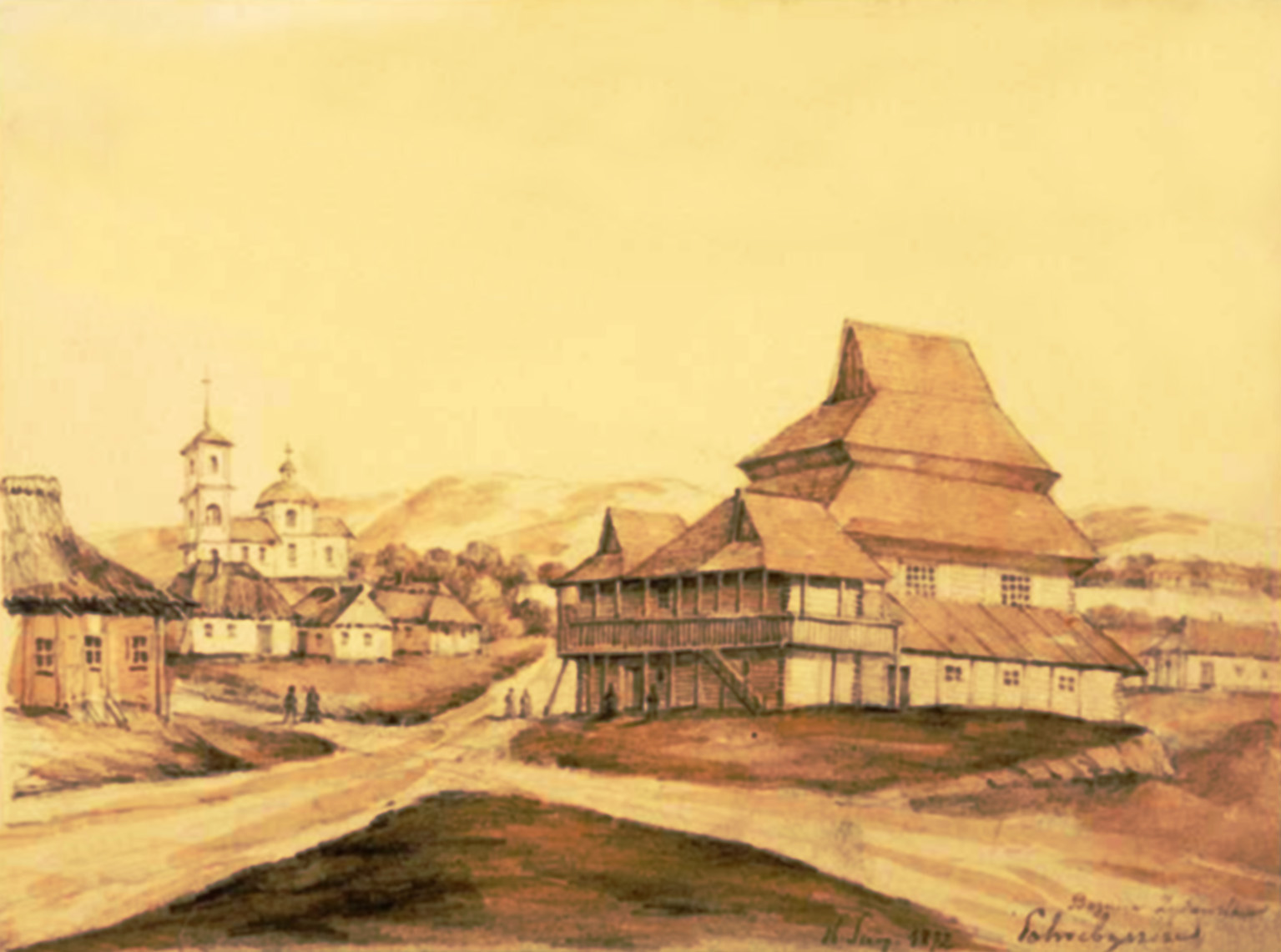
Synagogue and parochial church (Pohrebyszcze) by Napoleon Orda

The town is very old and origin of its name is not clear. Pohrebyshche means a big cellar in Ukrainian. On the other hand, Pohrebaty can be interpreted as to perform a burial. According to Imperial Russian ethnographer Lavrentii Pokhylevych in his work "Tales of inhabited areas of the Kyiv province" in 1884, before the Mongol invasion of Kyivan Rus', during the times of Kyiv the town was called Rokitnya. Mongols leveled the town leaving only the cellars.

The first time the town was mentioned in written sources was in 1148. For many years it belonged to the Kiev Voivodeship within the Polish–Lithuanian Commonwealth. During the Khmelnytsky Uprising (1648–1657) in 1653 it was completely destroyed by Stefan Czarniecki and in the later wars of the 17th century the town was destroyed by fire and its inhabitants massacred by foreign armies several times. Only around 1720 did a more fortunate period for Pohrebyshche begin. In 1795, the town became part of the Russian Empire.

== Pohrebyszcze massacre ==
In 1653 Stefan Czarniecki stormed Pohrebyszcze and exterminated the entire population: 700 prisoners were hanged, 300 were impaled, and the prince gave his soldiers the order: Execute them so that they feel they are dying. on the way through the forests, he decorated the pine trees by hanging prisoners on them. The Poles burned villages and chopped off heads; prisoners were tortured and burned with fire.

== Demographics ==
As of the Ukrainian national census in 2001, Pohrebyshche had a population was 10,673 inhabitants, which is almost entirely ethnically Ukrainian. The exact ethnic composition was as follows:

Ethnic groups in Pohrebyshche
	percent
Ukrainians	98.08%
Russians	1.38%
Poles	0.18%
Belarusians	0.16%

== People ==
Countess Ewelina Hańska (Rzewuska) a Polish noblewoman (szlachcianka) was born 6 January 1805, in Pohrebyshche. Ewelina was the sister of Henryk Rzewuski. She was married to Wacław Hański, a landowning noble, who was about twenty years older than she was. After his death she married the French novelist Honoré de Balzac in 1850.

The town had a substantial Jewish population. The Jews were murdered during the Second World War by the Nazis and local fascists. In 1928, the large synagogue was converted into a Workman's Club. It was destroyed during the war.

== Gallery ==
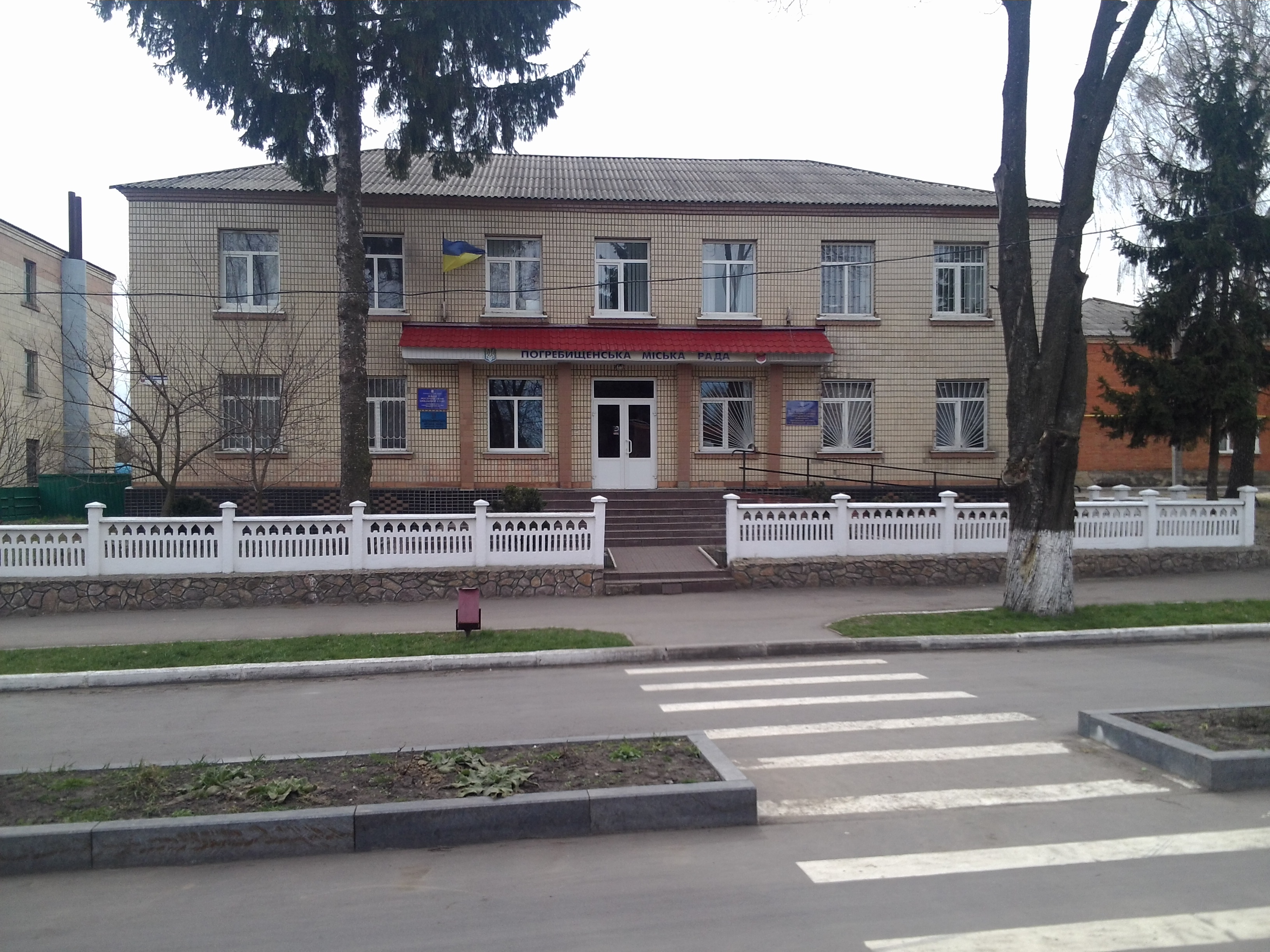
City hall

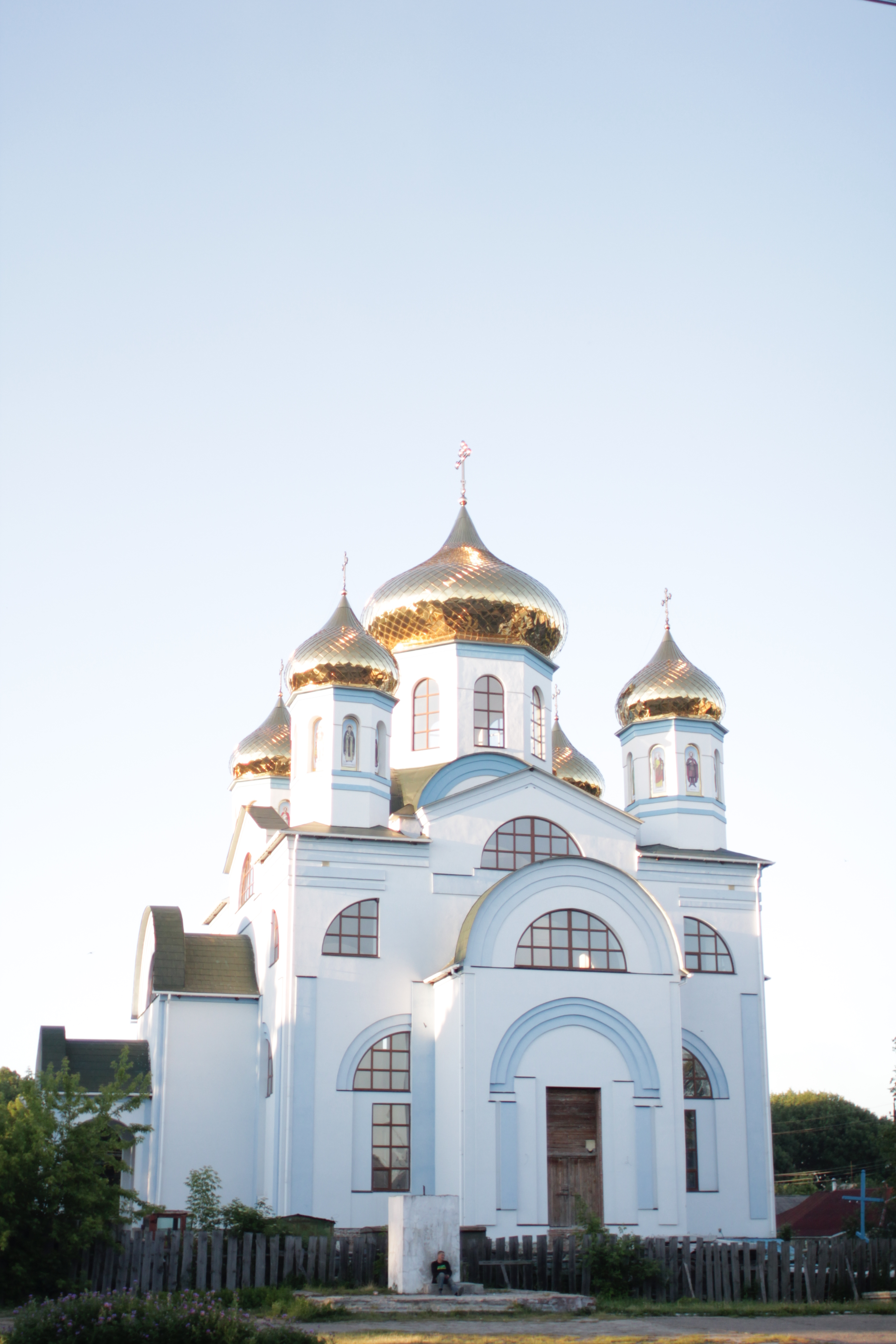
Church in Pohrebyshche

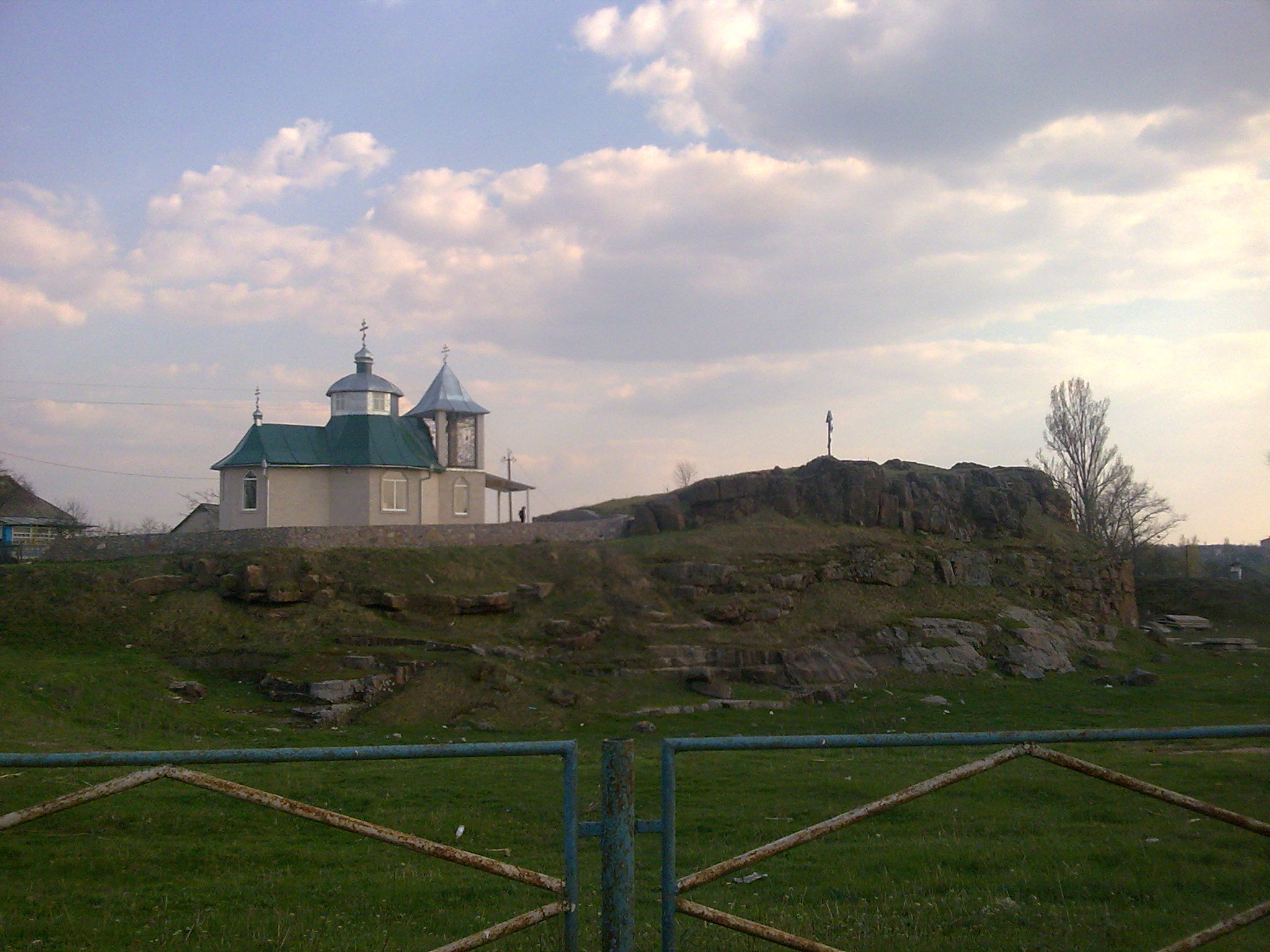
Chapel near the town

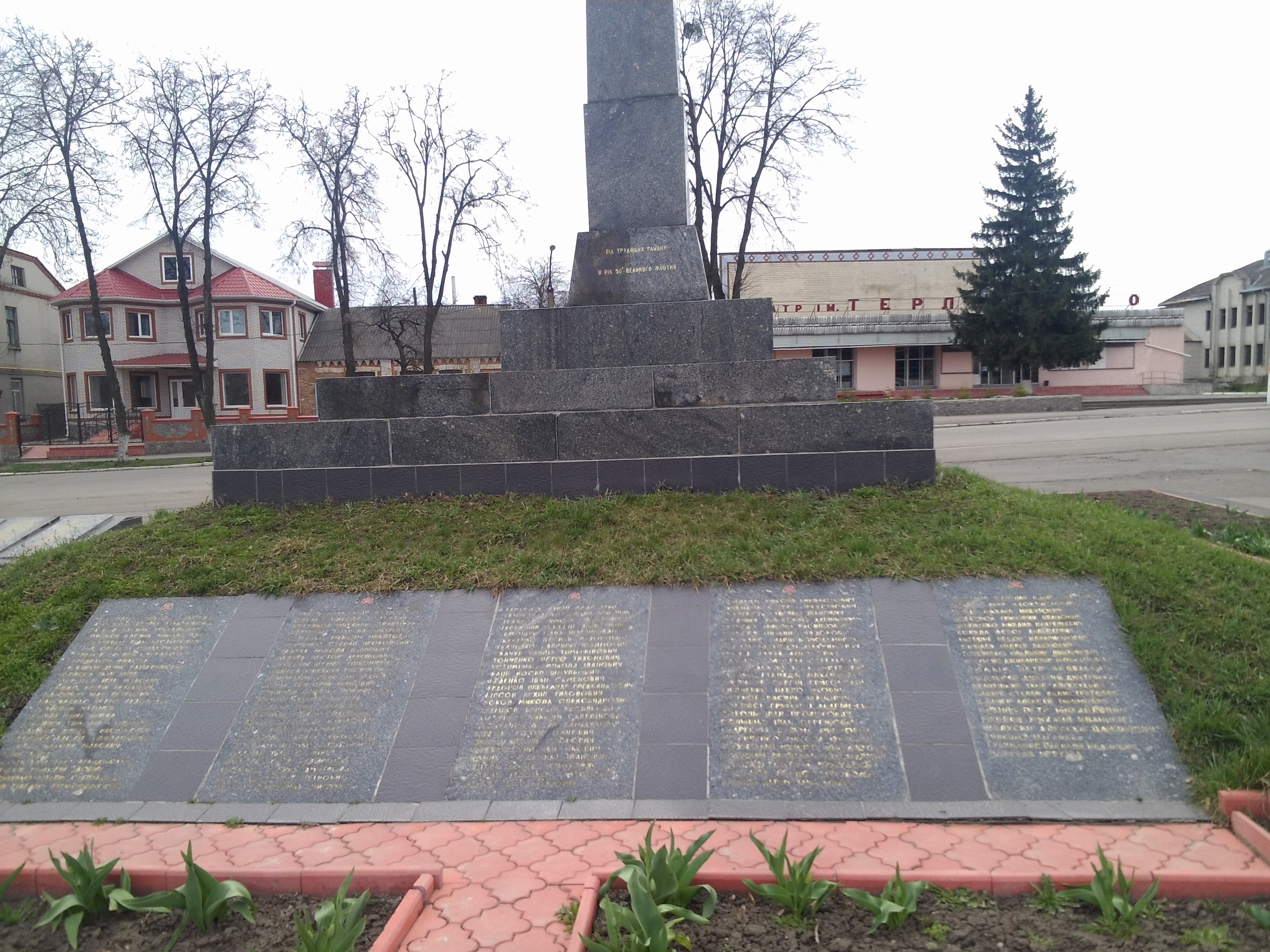
World War II memorial

== Other nearby communities ==
- Vinnytsia 40 miles (64 km) ENE
- Plyskiv 8 miles (13 km) S
- Borshchahivka 12 miles (19 km) E
- Ruzhyn 16 miles (26 km) N
- Bilylivka 17 miles (27 km) NW
- Samhorodok 19 miles (31 km) W
- Tetiiv 19 miles (31 km) ESE
- Lypovets 20 miles (32 km) SSW
- Zhyvotivka 21 miles (34 km) SE
- Vakhnivka 22 miles (35 km) WSW
- Skvyra 25 miles (40 km) NE
- Koziatyn 25 miles (40 km) NW
- Illintsi 25 miles (40 km) S
- Pavoloch 28 miles (45 km) NNE
- Volodarka 29 miles (47 km) E
- Balabanivka 30 miles (48 km) SSE
- Berdychiv 42 miles (68 km) SE
