= Von List =

Von List is a surname of German origin. Notable people with this surname include:

- Guido Karl Anton List (1848–1919), Austrian occultist, journalist, novelist and member of the Thule Society
- Wilhelm von List (1880–1971), German field marshal during the World War II

== See also ==
- List (surname)
