= Modeste Mignon =

1844 novel by Honoré de Balzac

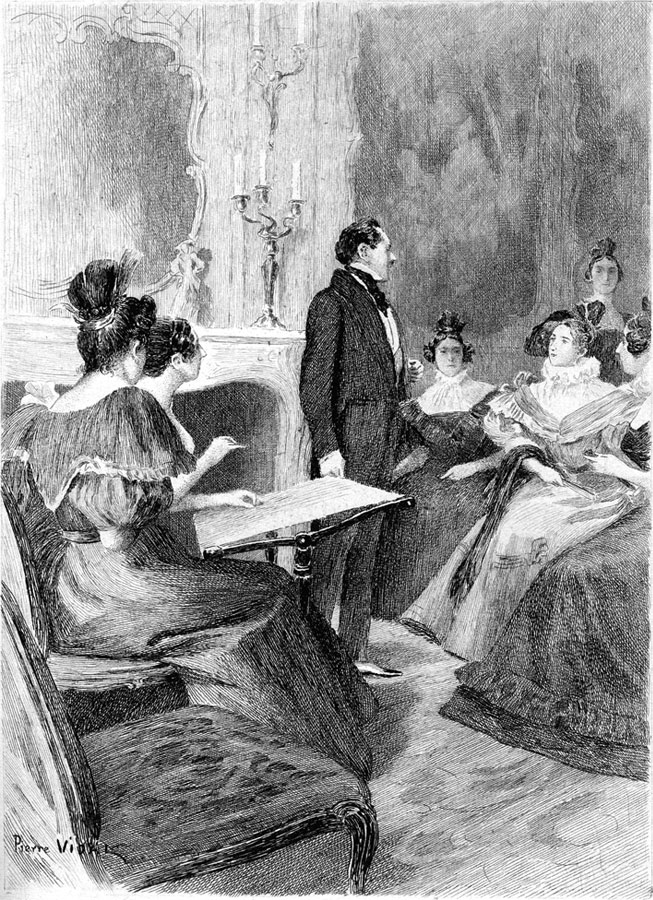
- Author: Honoré de Balzac
- Original title: Modeste Mignon
- Translator: Katharine Prescott Wormeley
- Illustrator: Pierre Vidal
- Language: French
- Series: La Comédie humaine
- Genre: Scènes de la vie privée
- Publisher: Chlenowski
- Publication date: 1844
- Publication place: France
- Preceded by: La Bourse
- Followed by: Un début dans la vie

Modeste Mignon is a novel by the French writer Honoré de Balzac. It is the fifth of the Scènes de la vie privée (Scenes of Private Life) in La Comédie humaine.

The first part of the novel was serialized in a bowdlerized edition in the Journal des débats in April, May and July 1844. A revised and expanded version of the work was later published by Chlenowski in two parts under the titles Modeste Mignon and Les Trois amoureux (The Three Suitors). The third and final edition of the novel appeared in 1846 as part of Furne's complete edition of La Comédie humaine. Modeste Mignon was the third work in Volume 4, or the twenty-third of the Scènes de la vie privée.

Balzac wrote Modeste Mignon after returning to France from Saint Petersburg, where he spent the summer of 1843 with his future wife the Countess Ewelina Hańska, to whom the work is dedicated:

Daughter of an enslaved land, angel through love, witch through fancy, child by faith, aged by experience, man in brain, woman in heart, giant by hope, mother through sorrows, poet in thy dreams – to thee belongs this book, in which thy love, thy fancy, thy experience, thy sorrow, thy hope, thy dreams, are the warp through which is shot a woof less brilliant than the poesy of thy soul, whose expression, when it shines upon thy countenance, is, to those who love thee, what the characters of a lost language are to scholars.

In Saint Petersburg Balzac had read a French translation of the correspondence between the German poet Johann Wolfgang von Goethe and the young German Romantic Bettina Brentano, who was thirty-seven years his junior. This work, as well as Balzac's own correspondence with young admirers, clearly inspired Modeste Mignon, a novel whose plot hinges on the correspondence between a famous poet and a young female admirer of his work. Parallels have also been detected with Balzac's experiences in St Petersburg: there is much of Countess Hańska in the character of Modeste, while her father's cousin Wenceslas Rzewuski has been compared to Modeste's father Charles Mignon.

== Plot ==
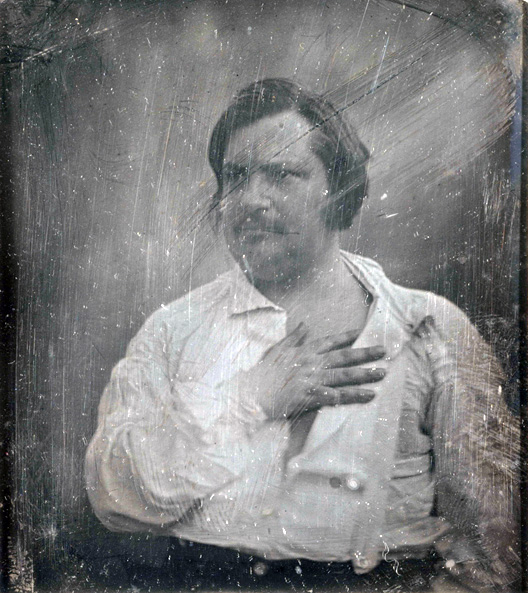
Honoré de Balzac

The first part of Modeste Mignon is based on a traditional species of folktale known as La fille mal gardée ("The Ill-Watched Girl"), in which a young woman takes a lover despite the close attentions of her guardians, who are determined to preserve her chastity for a more suitable match. Modeste Mignon, a young provincial woman of romantic temperament, imagines herself to be in love with the famous Parisian poet Melchior de Canalis, whose works have filled her with passion. She corresponds with him, but he is unmoved by her attentions. Canalis invites his secretary Ernest de la Brière to deal with the matter. Ernest replies to Modeste in Canalis' name; a dangerous intrigue ensues, which sees Ernest appear in Modeste's home town of Ingouville (near Le Havre) disguised as Canalis. The plot is complicated by the interference of Modeste's family and friends, who suspect that she has secretly taken a lover. The wily dwarf Butscha, who loves Modeste as a medieval knight might have loved a lady far above his station, is determined to unmask the man. Things come to a head when Ernest discovers that Modeste's father Charles Mignon has returned from his long exile a very wealthy man: Modeste is no longer a poor provincial girl but a rich heiress with six million francs to her name. Ernest reveals his true identity, but Modeste feels humiliated and casts him off. When Modeste's true worth becomes generally known, Canalis takes a renewed interest in her and believes that his poetic ardour will enable him to win her heart. But his secretary is no longer his only rival: a local wealthy potentate the Duc d'Hérouville now regards the nouveau-riche Modeste Mignon as a suitable match and throws his hat into the ring.

The second part of the novel is also based on a traditional story-type, The Rival Suitors. Ernest, Canalis and the Duc d'Hérouville are invited to Ingouville to compete for the hand of Modeste. Still smarting from the trick played on her by Ernest, Modeste is determined to choose between the passionate advances of the poet and the prospect of becoming a duchess should she accept Hérouville. Butscha, however, who realizes that Ernest is the one who truly loves her, is equally determined to expose the pretensions of Canalis and promote Ernest's suit. Thanks to Butscha's intrigues and her father's good sense, Modeste chooses Ernest and the two are married.

== Translations ==
The novel has been translated into English by Katherine Prescott Wormeley and Clara Bell.

== See also ==
- Repertory Of The Comedie Humaine
