= Frank Gillis =

American jazz musician

Frank J. Gillis
- Born: 20 August 1914; Toronto, Canada
- Died: 17 September 1999 (aged 85); Grand Marais, Minnesota
- Education: Wayne State University; Columbia University; University of Minnesota
- Employer: Indiana University Bloomington
- Known for: Jazz piano, ethnomusicology, and bibliography

Frank J. Gillis (20 August 1914 – 17 September 1999) was an American jazz pianist, ethnomusicologist and bibliographer.

== Life and work ==
Gillis was born in Toronto on 20 August 1914. He grew up in Detroit and began his musical studies learning the violin. It was not until age 17 that he began studying piano. From the mid-1930s into the 1940s, he played in the local Ash Trumpet Club with traditional jazz musicians including Bobby Hackett, Red Nichols, Jack Teagarden and Doc Cenardo. After earning his bachelor's degree from Wayne State University, he studied musicology (specializing in ethnomusicology) at Columbia University in New York City. He went on to earn a Master of Library Science from the University of Minnesota.

During the 1950s and 1960s, Gillis played piano regularly with Doc Evans and can be heard on some Evans albums. After that, he led the Superior Jazz Band. Gillis worked for 25 years in the Archives of Traditional Music at Indiana University in Bloomington, Indiana. First as Associate Director from 1964 to 1977 and then as Director from 1977 to 1981. During his tenure, he was responsible for the acquisition of a large collection of Shellac Discs, supervised students, gave concerts in Bloomington with the Faculty Five, and taught Jazz and Jazz research at the university.

Gillis was also (co-)author of several musicological bibliographies, he was the president of the Society for Ethnomusicology from 1973 to 1975, and from 1966 until 1970 he was the editor of the journal Ethnomusicology, for which he wrote numerous original bibliographical articles including discographies and filmographies. He also published the documentary album and book, Indiana Ragtime, on which he is featured as a pianist. Additionally, he worked on the publication of jazz trumpeter Lee Collins's memoirs.

He died in Grand Marais, Minnesota on 17 September 1999.

== Publications ==
- Frank Gillis, Minnesota Music in the Nineteenth Century: A Guide to Sources and Resources (1958)
- Frank Gillis & Alan P. Merriam, Ethnomusicology and Folk Music: An International Bibliography of Dissertations and Theses (1966)
- Frank Gillis & Neil V. Rosenberg, Catalog of Indian Folk Music and Folklore (1970)
- Frank Gillis & Ruth M. Stone, African Music and Oral Data: A Catalog of Field Recordings, 1902–1975 (1976)
- John Edward Hasse & Frank Gillis: Indiana Ragtime. A Documentary Album / The Radiant Rag. Indianapolis, Indiana Historical Society. 1981
- Lee Collins: Oh Didn't He Ramble – The Life Story of Lee Collins as Told to Mary Collins. Edited by Frank J. Gillis and John W. Miner. Urbana, Chicago, London. University of Illinois Press. 1974.
