= Listing =

Listing may refer to:

- Enumeration of a set of items in the form of a list
- Listing (computer), a computer code listing
- Listing (finance), the placing of a company's shares on the list of stocks traded on a stock exchange
- Johann Benedict Listing (1808–1882), German mathematician
- Navigation listing, tilting of vessels in a nautical context
- Listings magazine, a type of magazine displaying a schedule of programmed content
- Designation as a listed building in the United Kingdom
- A term in US real estate brokerage, referring to the obtaining of a written contract to represent the seller of a property or business

== See also ==
- List (disambiguation)
