= LST =

LST may refer to:

== Education ==
- Licentiate of Sacred Theology
- Liston College
- London School of Theology

== Organizations ==
- Law School Transparency
- Linux Support Team, a defunct German Linux distributor (LST Linux, Power Linux) since 1993
- LST Software GmbH (from Linux System Technology), a German software company, successor of Linux Support Team and predecessor of Caldera Deutschland GmbH

== Places ==
- Launceston Airport
- Liverpool Street station, a major railway and tube station in London (station code LST)

== Science and technology ==
- Land Surveyor in Training
- Landing Ship, Tank, a type of ship designed to support amphibious operations
- Laplace-Stieltjes transform, a transform similar to the Laplace transform
- Large Space Telescope, the Hubble Space Telescope
- Living Systems Theory
- Log-space transducer, a type of Turing machine used for log-space reductions
- Löwenheim–Skolem theorem, a theorem in first-order logic dealing with the cardinality of models
- Lowstand systems tract, a systems tract in sequence stratigraphy
- LST:, a built-in device driver name in 86-DOS and some versions of MS-DOS 1.25
- Lyddane–Sachs–Teller relation for optical phonons in solids or the related relation for hydrodynamics

== Time ==
- Least slack time scheduling
- Local Sidereal Time
- Local Standard Time

== Other ==
- L.S.T. (album)

== See also ==
- list (disambiguation)
- LSST (disambiguation)
