= George Harold List =

American ethnomusicologist (1911–2008)

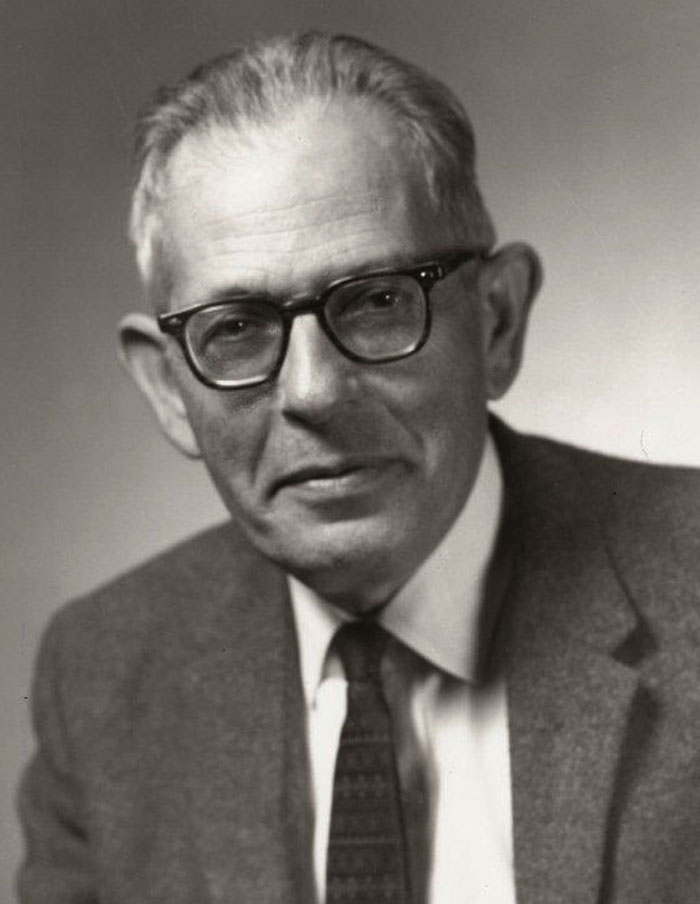
- George Harold List
- Born: February 9, 1911; Tucson, Arizona, United States
- Died: September 28, 2008 (aged 97)
- Occupations: Ethnomusicologist, flautist, composer, academic
- Employer: Indiana University

Academic work
- Notable works: Music and Poetry in a Colombian Village: A Tri-Cultural Heritage (1983)

George Harold List (February 9, 1911 – September 28, 2008) was an American ethnomusicologist, composer, academic, and flautist. He served as Professor of Ethnomusicology at Indiana University and was director of the university's Archives of Traditional Music between 1954 and 1976. List is regarded as one of the formative figures of modern ethnomusicology in the United States, recognized for both his theoretical contributions and extensive fieldwork in Colombia, Ecuador, and among the Hopi of Arizona.

== Early life and education ==
List was born in Tucson, Arizona, on February 9, 1911. He studied flute from the age of 11, and at 17 entered the Juilliard School of Music, graduating with a diploma in flute performance in 1933. He married pianist Eve Zipoura Ehrlich in 1934. List subsequently pursued graduate studies at Teachers College, Columbia University, earning a B.S. and M.A. (1941 and 1945), and later completed his Ph.D. at Indiana University in 1954.

== Musical career ==
As a professional flautist, List performed with the Brooklyn Symphony Orchestra, the New York Civic Symphony, and the spring orchestras of Denver and Colorado. He also composed works for flute and piano, string quartets, quintets, mixed choirs, and women's vocal ensembles. His compositions include Memoir and Scherzino for flute and piano (1951), Music for Children (1952), and the orchestral satire Marche O'Malley (1947).

== Indiana University ==
In 1954, List was appointed director of the Archives of Folk and Primitive Music —renamed Archives of Traditional Music in 1965 under his leadership— at Indiana University, a position he held until 1976. He supervised the Archives' move to permanent facilities in Maxwell Hall and instituted accession and shelf numbering systems that remain in use. Drawing on best practices observed at the Vienna Phonogrammarchiv, he established comprehensive policies and procedures for conservation, cataloguing, and researcher access, modernizing the collection and positioning it as a leading institution.

Simultaneously, List served as associate professor of folklore and later professor of ethnomusicology, helping to establish Indiana University's ethnomusicology programme. He also taught a required course in transcription and analysis for ethnomusicology students, and his writings on transcription and field research were influential in defining the scope and methodology of the discipline. In 1964, he became a member of the newly founded Folklore Institute, further integrating his research with broader folkloristic scholarship.

In 1966, List founded the Inter-American Program in Ethnomusicology of Traditional Music, fostering international collaboration and research in the Americas. From 1958 to 1968, he edited The Folklore and Folk Music Archivist, contributing key scholarship that shaped the emerging field of ethnomusicology and documented traditional musical cultures for future study.

== Fieldwork in Colombia ==
Between 1964 and 1970 List carried out four research trips to the Colombian Caribbean region, producing more than 120 open-reel tapes of music, interviews, and folktales documenting Afro-Colombian and Indigenous traditions. His recordings included ensembles of gaita larga, caña de millo, funeral chants, work songs, and children's games. Collaborating with Colombian folklorists Manuel and Delia Zapata Olivella and Winston Caballero, he documented performances by musicians later renowned in Colombian traditional music, including Toño Fernández, Catalino Parra, and Sixto Silgado "Paíto". Some of the repertoires he recorded are no longer performed, making his collections a critical historical record.

In addition to audio recordings, List's Colombian collections comprise more than 90 photographs of performers, instruments, and landscapes, and extensive interviews in Spanish. A commercial album, Cantos costeños: Folksongs of the Atlantic Coastal Region of Colombia, was issued in 1973.

== Other fieldwork ==
List also conducted fieldwork among the Hopi people of northern Arizona and in Indigenous communities of the Ecuadorian Andes and Amazonia during the 1960s and 1970s. His research combined ethnomusicological and folkloristic perspectives, documenting both musical practices and broader expressive culture, including folktales and rituals.

== Publications ==
List published more than 60 scholarly articles and several books. His best-known monograph, Music and Poetry in a Colombian Village: A Tri-Cultural Heritage (Indiana University Press, 1983), analyses the interplay of Indigenous, African, and European elements in Colombian village traditions. The book was translated into Spanish and published in Bogotá in 1995. Other significant works include Singing About It: Folksong in Southern Indiana (1991) and Stability and Variation in Hopi Song (1993). He also contributed theoretical essays on the scope and boundaries of ethnomusicology.

== Recognition ==
List received research fellowships from the National Endowment for the Humanities, the Indiana Historical Society, the American Philosophical Society, and a Fulbright research award. His influence is acknowledged in the establishment of ethnomusicology as a distinct academic field in the United States.

== Death ==
George Harold List died on September 28, 2008, aged 97.

== Selected works ==
- Music and Poetry in a Colombian Village: A Tri-Cultural Heritage (1983)
- Singing About It: Folksong in Southern Indiana (1991)
- Stability and Variation in Hopi Song (1993)
- Cantos costeños: Folksongs of the Atlantic Coastal Region of Colombia (album, 1973)
