= Bill Robinson (jazz singer) =

American jazz musician

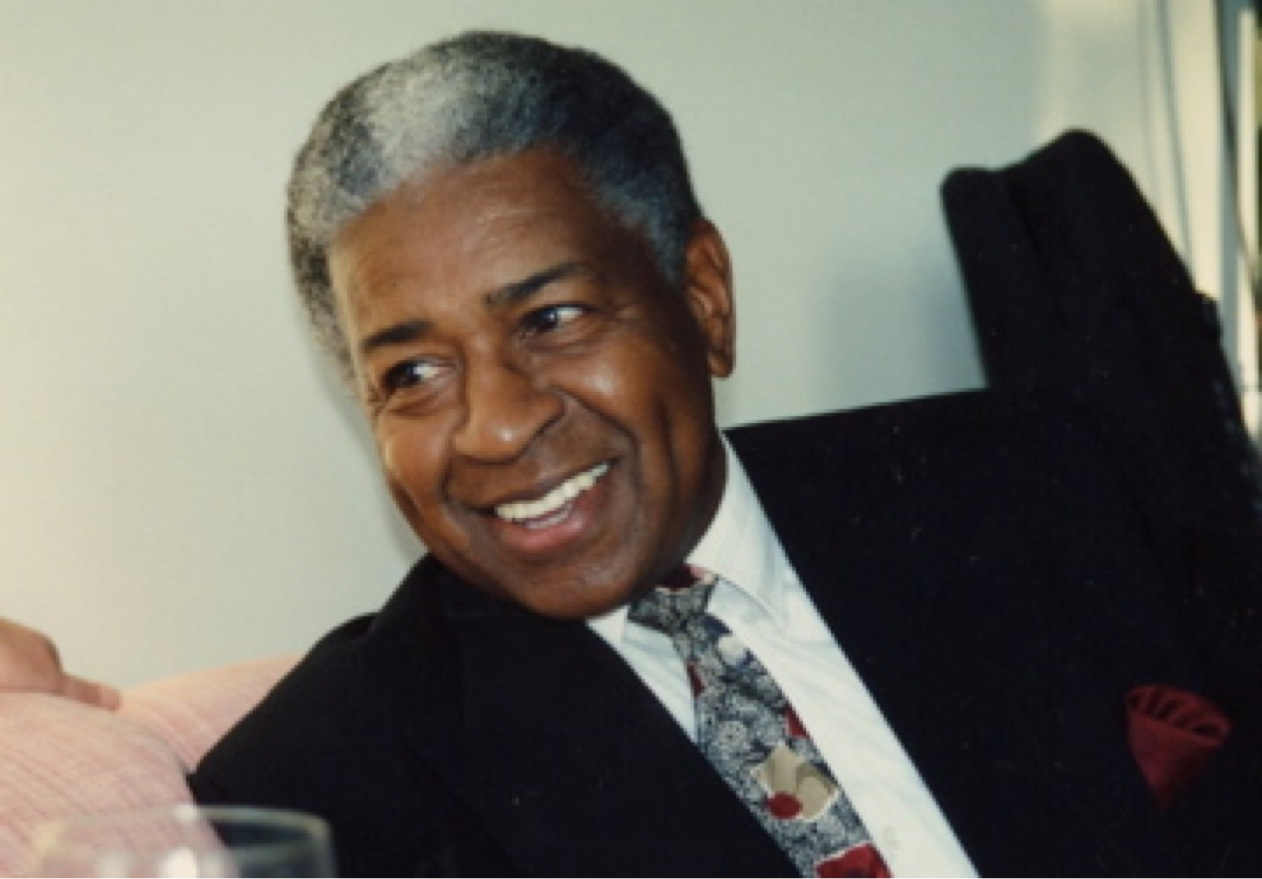

Background information
- Born: February 1929; Parkersburg, West Virginia
- Genres: Vocal jazz
- Occupation: Singer

Bill Robinson is an American tenor jazz singer born in West Virginia and based in Summit, New Jersey. He has had a long career and continues to perform in his 80s. The Star-Ledger described his voice as "gleaming" and "lustrous" with a "sure sense of swing". He has performed with jazz pianist Betty Liste, jazz guitarists John Zweig and John Carlini, violinist Marion Mansfield, mandolinist Don Stiernberg, Brian Glassman, and many others. He sings in a variety of jazz styles, including the Great American Songbook, jazz standards, bluegrass music, classical music, gypsy music, Brazilian jazz, and others. He has performed at the Apollo Theater in New York. He has opened for comedian Jackie Mason and jazz vibraphonist Lionel Hampton. As a youth, Robinson began singing at the age of six, was influenced by singers such as Louis Armstrong and Cab Calloway.
