= Archives of Traditional Music =

Archives by the Indiana University

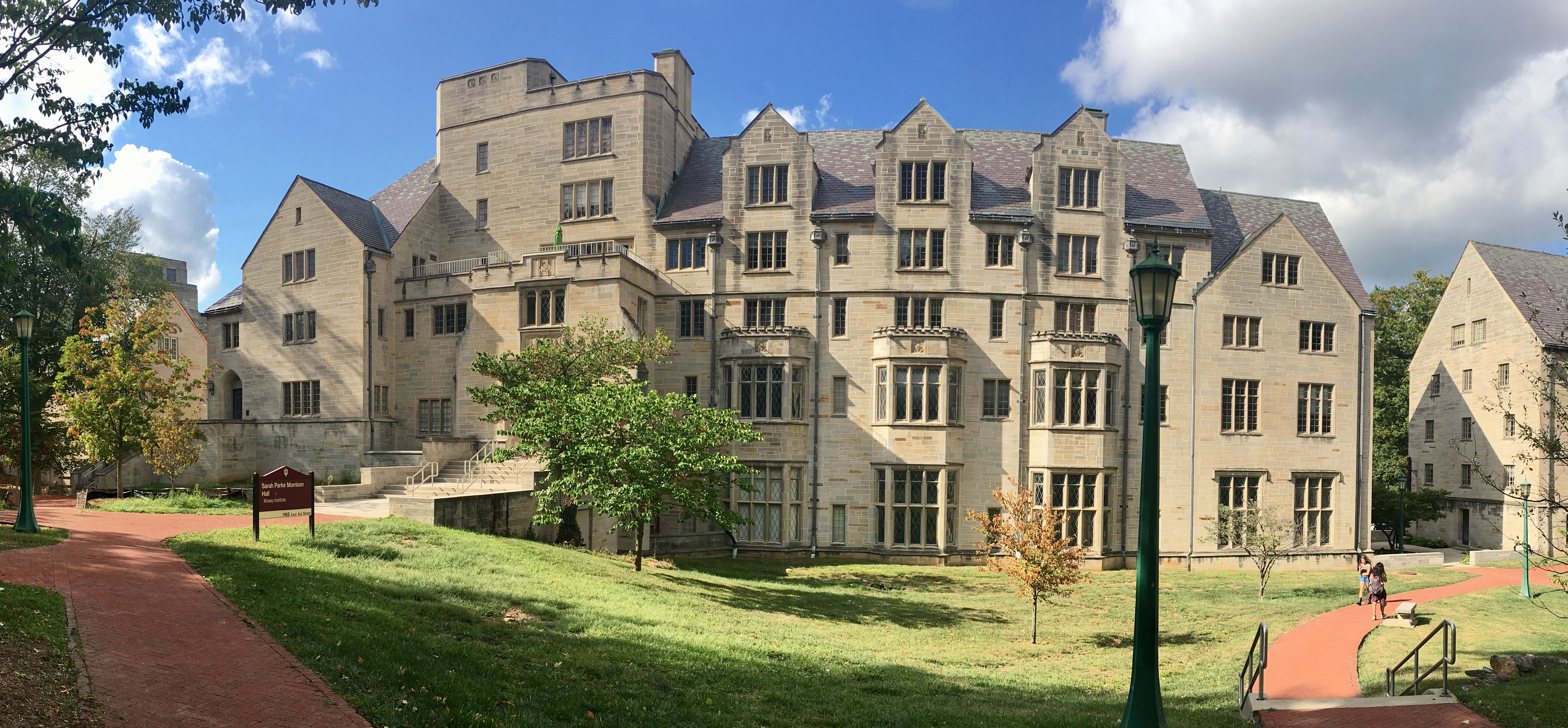
- Morrison Hall, current home of the Archives
- 39°09′55″N 86°31′11″W
- Location: Bloomington, IN, U.S.
- Established: 1954; 72 years ago
- Branches: N/A

Collection
- Size: More than 100,000 recordings including nearly 7000 wax cylinders, 4600 lacquer discs, 2625 aluminum discs, 250 wires, 18,000 open reel tapes, 7500 audiocassettes, 911 films, and 1500 video recordings. The Archives holds over 2700 collections of field recordings and over 24,300 commercial recordings.

Access and use
- Circulation: Archives do not publicly circulate
- Population served: 48,514 faculty, staff, and students at Indiana University Bloomington, additional scholars, and members of the public

Other information
- Website: https://www.libraries.indiana.edu/archives-traditional-music

The Indiana University Archives of Traditional Music holds over 100,000 individual audio and video recordings across over 3500 collections of field, broadcast, and commercial recordings. Its holdings are primarily focused on audiovisual recordings relating to research in the academic disciplines of ethnomusicology, folklore, anthropology, linguistics, and various area studies.

== History ==
The archive was initiated by George Herzog at Columbia University in 1936. It was modeled on the Berliner Phonogramm-Archiv, where Herzog had worked as an assistant to Erich M. von Hornbostel from 1921 to 1924. Herzog brought the nascent archive to Indiana University in 1948 when he was appointed as professor in the Department of Anthropology. The archive was formally established at Indiana University in 1954 under its second director, George List, as the Archives of Folk and Primitive Music. Its present name, the Archives of Traditional Music, was adopted in 1964 when it became a division of the Folklore Institute.

=== Directors ===
Date	Name	Notes
1948–1954	George Herzog	
1954–1977	George List	
1977–1981	Frank Gillis	
1981–1982	Ronald Smith	Acting Director
1982–1988	Anthony Seeger	
1988–1995	Ruth M. Stone	
1995–2000	Gloria J. Gibson	
2000–2002	Ruth M. Stone	Interim Director
2002–2007	Daniel Reed	
2007–2023	Alan Burdette	

== Facilities ==
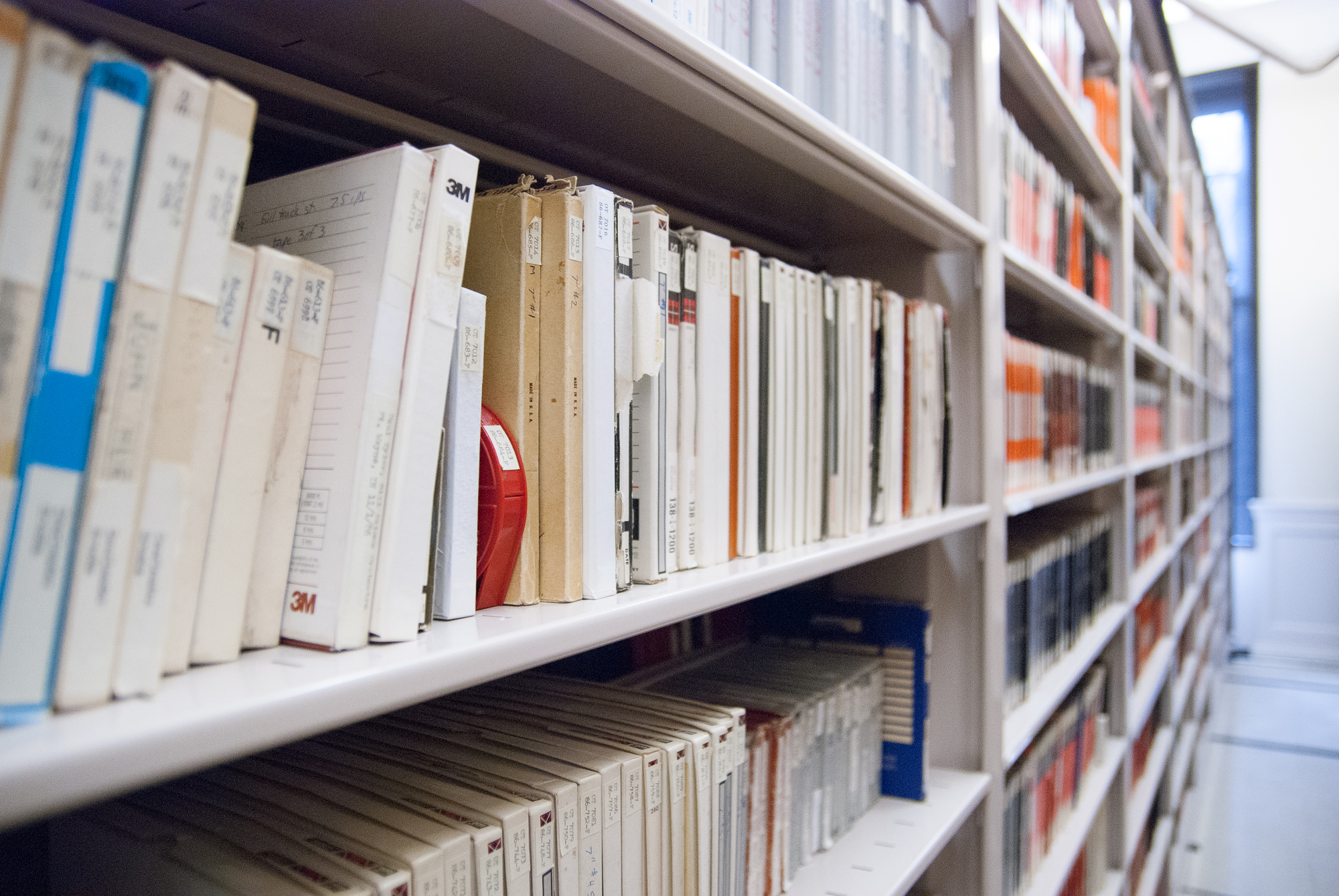
A shelf in the vault

- Listening Library: a public service point for visitors where they can listen and view recordings and get reference assistance from staff.
- Reading Room
- Hoagy Carmichael Room: a room is used for performances, lectures and receptions and displays artifacts, photographs, and manuscripts from the life and career of Hoagy Carmichael. The room can be visited by appointment during the open hours of the Archives of Traditional Music.
- Studios
- Vault: A 2,138 square foot temperature- and humidity-controlled storage space. Many formats of materials are kept in the vault, including 7000 wax cylinders, 4600 lacquer discs, 2625 aluminum discs, 250 wires, 18,000 open reel tapes, 7500 audiocassettes, 911 films, and 1500 video recordings. Nearly half of the recordings are unique field recordings that document the expressive culture and languages of peoples around the world.

== Holdings ==
Holdings of the Archives of Traditional Music are cataloged at the collection level as MARC records within the Indiana University online library catalog, IUCAT. These can be searched through http://iucat.iu.edu. Using the "advanced search" capabilities of IUCAT, a user can restrict a search to only ATM Library holdings. Commercial recordings as well as many broadcast recordings are cataloged at the item level, which means there is one catalog record per physical item. Field collections, on the other hand, may consist of hundreds of recordings as well as photographs, field notes, and other materials.

=== Holdings on the National Recording Registry ===
Year Inducted	Title	Composer/Recorder	Year Recorded	Notes
2018	Ola Belle Reed	Recorded by Gei Zantzinger and released on Rounder Records in 1973	1972	Master recordings held by the Archives of Traditional Music.
2017	Standing Rock Reservation Recordings	Yanktonai-Dakota singers recorded by George Herzog	1928	Field recordings on 195 phonograph cylinders
2013	Songs sung by Kwakwaka'wakw (Kwakiutl) Chief Dan Cranmer	Franz Boas and George Herzog, Interviewers	1938	Field recordings on 22 aluminum discs
2006	Interviews with William "Billy" Bell, representing the Edward D. Ives Collection	William "Billy" Bell recorded by Edward D. ("Sandy") Ives	1928	Field recordings on 28 open reel tapes; (other recordings also held at Maine Folklife Center, University of Maine)
2005	Listen to the Lambs (single)	Hampton Quartette, recorded by Natalie Curtis Burlin	1917	Field recording in a collection of 15 phonograph cylinders
2004	Stardust (single)	Hoagy Carmichael	1927	Pop, pre-1955; manuscript held in the archive
2004	Rosina Cohen oral narrative from the Lorenzo Dow Turner Collection	Rosina Cohen, Lorenzo D. Turner	1932	Field recording in a collection of 154 aluminum disc recordings from the U.S. Sea Islands
2003	Johnson (Guy B.) Cylinder recordings of African-American music	Guy B. Johnson	1920s	Field recordings on 8 phonograph cylinders

== Preservation ==
Following insights gained through the Sound Directions Project about a looming crisis in time-based media preservation, staff at the ATM pursued a collaborative strategy for saving its media holdings. In 2008, they participated in a small coalition of archivists and librarians at Indiana University that began a survey of the audio-visual materials held on the Bloomington Campus. The survey was prompted by the recognition that the university held a large amount of time-based media in danger of deterioration and playback obsolescence. This survey revealed that the Bloomington campus held more than a half-million audiovisual recordings across eighty units and that large portions of the university's holdings were at risk for loss. Following the publication of a survey report in 2009, the Office of the Vice Provost for Research funded a preservation planning document under the aegis of what was known as the Media Preservation Initiative (MPI). Based on the recommendations of the planning document, Indiana University President Michael McRobbie announced a 15 million dollar commitment to the preservation of audio and video recordings on the Bloomington campus. The resulting endeavor was renamed the Media Preservation and Digitization Initiative (MDPI) which formed a partnership with Memnon Archiving Services to digitally preserve 280,000 audio and video recordings by 2020. In 2017, 12,000 films from Indiana University's Moving Image Archives and other campus collections, including the Archives of Traditional Music, were added to the efforts of MDPI. As the largest holder of unique and rare audiovisual recordings at Indiana University, nearly all of the archives' 100,000 recordings will be digitized by 2020 through this initiative. MDPI was the first – and as of 2018 the only – university-based media preservation effort in the United States on this scale.

== Projects ==
=== Archive of Historical and Ethnographic Yiddish Memories ===
The AHEYM Project has collected nearly 400 interviews related to Jewish life before, during, and after World War II. Conducted primarily in Yiddish, the interviewees come from small towns throughout Ukraine, Moldova, Romania, Hungary and Slovakia. The current online exhibit covers daily life, foodways, Jewish life between the wars, religion, World War II and the Holocaust, and Jewish life after World War II. The archive can be explored by location, person, or subject. Preservation and cataloging of AHEYM Project recordings was funded by the National Endowment for the Humanities.

=== Ethnographic Video for Instruction and Analysis (EVIA) Digital Archive ===
The EVIA Digital Archive is a project created to host a digital archive of ethnographic videos for educational use. The projected originated from a collaboration between Indiana University and University of Michigan.

=== Ethnomusicology Multimedia ===
EM publishes books and supplemental audiovisual material on Ethnomusicology in order to aid scholars in research. EM offers access to Annotation Management System (AMS), which allows authors to upload audiovisual material and link it to content in their text. EM is a joint project between Indiana and Temple Universities.

=== Hoagy Carmichael Online ===
The Hoagy Carmichael Project at Indiana University was a project funded by IMLS between 1999 and 2000 to digitize and preserve the extensive collection of items related to Hoagy Carmichael that are housed at Indiana University. This early digital collection website aimed to present in its entirety the complete Carmichael collection. The collection contains sound recordings, letters, photographs, lyric sheets, correspondence, as well as personal effects. It offers a biography and a virtual tour of the Carmichael Room located at the Archives of Traditional Music.

=== Liberian Collections Project ===
The Liberian Collection was established in 2002. The Archives of Traditional Music is home to the audiovisual part of the collection.

=== Sound Directions ===
The Sound Directions Project was a joint project between Indiana University's Archives of Traditional Music and Harvard University's Archive of World Music and funded by the National Endowment for the Humanities between 2005 and 2011. Phase 1 consisted of testing and determining the best practices and workflows for digital audio preservation. The following two phases focused on the preservation of archive holdings and on the development of software tools for media assessment and technical metadata collection.

=== The Archives of the Languages of the World ===
A collection of sound recordings and documentation focused on documenting endangered languages around the world, particularly from the Americas. The collection is also known as the C.F. and F.M. Voegelin Archives of the Languages of the World.

== Publications ==
- ReSound (quarterly) ISSN 0749-2472; OCLC: 10204552. Issues are available online at IU ScholarWorks
- Folklore and Folk Music Archivist ISSN 0430-8840; OCLC: 1569577. Issues are available online at IU ScholarWorks

== See also ==
- National Recording Registry
