= Pohrebyshche Synagogue =

Former synagogue in Pohrebyshche, Ukraine

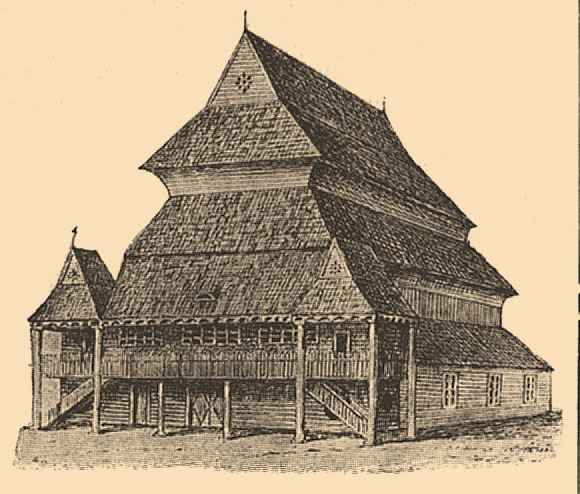
- The Pohrebyschtsche synagogue before 1906

- Location of the former synagogue in Ukraine

Religion
- Affiliation: Judaism (former)
- Ecclesiastical or organizational status: Synagogue (c. 1625–1919)

Location
- Location: Pohrebyshche, Vinnytsia Oblast
- Country: Ukraine
- Interactive map of Pohrebyshche Synagogue
- Coordinates: 49°29′00″N 29°16′00″E

Architecture
- Style: Wooden synagogue
- Completed: 1690
- Destroyed: 21 July 1941; during World War II

Specifications
- Length: 16.7 metres (55 ft)
- Width: 20.4 metres (67 ft)
- Materials: Timber

Pohrebyshche Synagogue was a former Jewish synagogue, located in Pohrebyshche, a town in Vinnytsia Oblast, Ukraine. The wooden synagogue was built in 1690, to replace an earlier synagogue, and was destroyed by German Nazis during World War II.

== History ==
A wooden synagogue stood in Pohrebyshche in the first half of the 17th century, already in 1648 described as ancient. During the Khmelnytsky Uprising of 1648 to 1657, and the wars of the 17th century, the town was destroyed by fire several times. In 1690 the wooden synagogue was rebuilt.

Major restorations took place in 1790, and in 1892 the exterior was rebuilt while the interior was retained.

When the Russians took over Pogrebishische in 1919, the wooden synagogue ceased to be a house of worship, and in 1928 the building was converted into a workers' club.

Pogrebishische was overrun by the Germans on 21 July 1941 and the synagogue was destroyed. On 18 October, over 1,750 Jews were murdered in a nearby forest.

== Architecture ==
The main hall was approximately square (12 by 12.4 metres (39 ft × 41 ft)) with a central part (8 metres (26 ft)) and two lateral parts, which were narrower (width 1.8 metres (5 ft 11 in)) and lower. The main hall was built up on three sides: vestibule with upper-level women's prayer area on the west side and low, single-storey women's prayer areas against north and south walls. At the western corners there were two-storey corner pavilions. The room on the southern side was heated and served as a meeting room for the community elders.

The walls were made of horizontal timbers, in the main hall they were reinforced by stiffeners.

The roof above the main hall was offset, two-tiered, with lower tier hipped and upper tier half-gabled. The corner-pavilions together with the galleries surrounding them were covered by hipped roofs.

The walls were originally polychromed; on the east wall remained traces of the former coloured wall paintings, presenting various birds, plants and domesticated animals.

The holy ark, width 1.7 metres (5 ft 7 in), height 4.5 metres (15 ft), was placed on a table of drawers. In three tiers it was ornamented by winding flora with symmetrically positioned birds and animals.

The bimah stood on an octagonal podium and was surrounded by a balustrade with banisters.

== See also ==
- History of the Jews in Ukraine
- List of synagogues in Ukraine
