= The List =

The List may refer to:

== Film and television ==
=== Film ===
- The List (2007 film), an American thriller directed by Gary Wheeler
- The List (2012 film), an American documentary by Beth Murphy
- The List (2022 film), a Paraguayan-Argentine thriller by Michael J. Hardy
- The List (2023 film), an American romantic comedy film directed by Melissa Miller Costanzo
- Nobody's Fool (2018 film) (working title The List), an American comedy-drama by Tyler Perry

=== Television ===
- The List (Canadian TV program), a 2007–2008 reality series
- "The List" (The Amazing World of Gumball), 2017
- "The List" (Camp Lazlo), 2007
- "The List" (The Jeffersons), 1983
- "The List" (Line of Duty), 2016
- "The List" (NCIS: New Orleans), 2015
- "The List" (The Office), 2011
- "The List" (South Park), 2007
- "The List" (The X-Files), 1995

== Other uses ==
- The List (album), a 2009 album by Rosanne Cash
- The List (magazine), a Scotland-based UK arts and entertainment magazine
- "The List", a song by King Combs from Never Stop, 2025
- "The List", a song by Maisie Peters, 2020
- The List, a 2000 novel by Robert Whitlow, basis for the 2007 film
- TheList.com, a women's lifestyle website published by Static Media

== See also ==
- List (disambiguation)
