= Wacław Hański =

Polish nobleman, Ewelina Hańska's first husband (1782–1841)

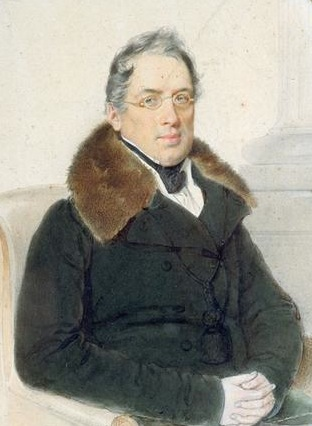
Wacław Hański

Wacław Hański (1782–1841) was a Polish noble (Korczak coat of arms), landowner, marszałek of the nobility in the Volhynian Governorate. He was the first husband of Ewelina Hańska.
