= Peyton List =

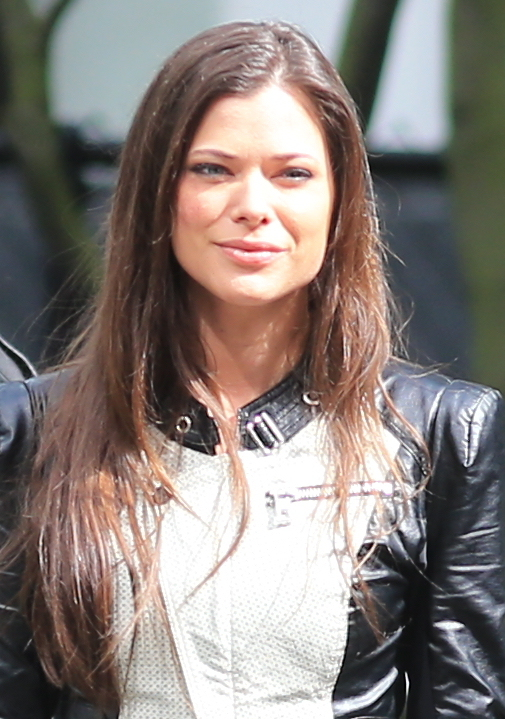
Peyton List (actress, born 1986), shown in 2014.

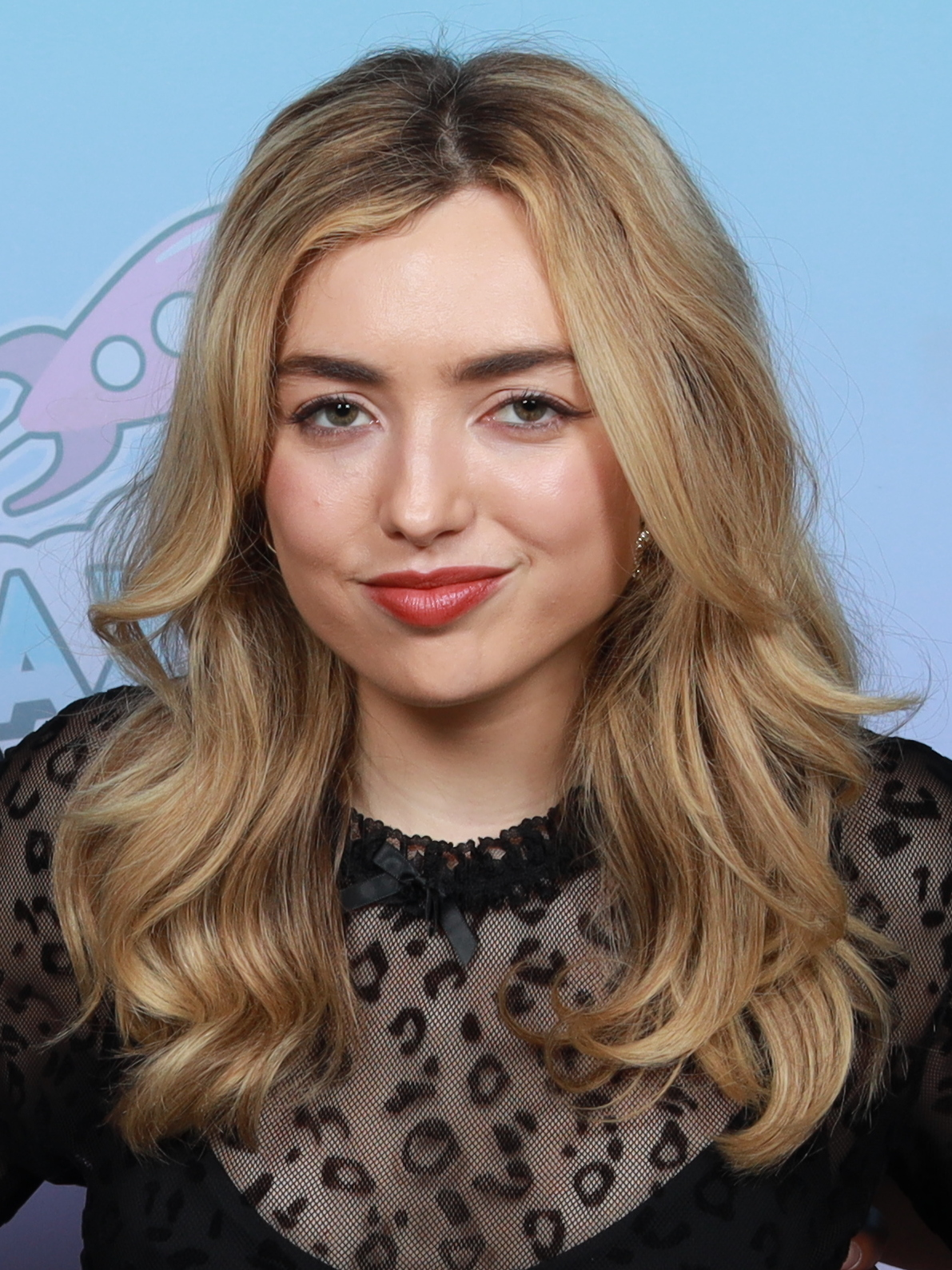
Peyton List (actress, born 1998), shown in 2024.

Peyton List may refer to:

- Peyton List (actress, born 1986), American actress from Massachusetts; starred in Mad Men, FlashForward, and Frequency
- Peyton List (actress, born 1998), American actress from Florida; starred in Jessie, Bunk'd, Diary of a Wimpy Kid, and Cobra Kai

== See also ==
- Peyton (disambiguation)
