= Lisztomania (song) =

2009 single by Phoenix

Single by Phoenix

from the album Wolfgang Amadeus Phoenix
- B-side: "Remixes"
- Released: July 7, 2009
- Recorded: 2008
- Genre: Indie rock; disco-rock; alternative rock; neo-psychedelia
- Length: 4:02 (album version); 3:18 (video edit)
- Label: V2; Loyauté; Glassnote
- Songwriter: Phoenix
- Producers: Phoenix; Philippe Zdar

Phoenix singles chronology
"1901" (2009)	"Lisztomania" (2009)	"Lasso" (2009)

Audio sample
- "Lisztomania": file; help

"Lisztomania" is a song by the French band Phoenix from their fourth album Wolfgang Amadeus Phoenix. It is their second single from the album, although a music video of the song was released before "1901". The music video shows them walking around Bayreuth, Germany, inside and outside the Franz Liszt Museum, Wahnfried, the Bayreuth Festspielhaus, sitting inside the Festspiel Theatre, performing live and going outside to find a blimp like the one shown on the album cover. The song helped the album to be their most successful following their previous hit, "1901".

It peaked at #11 on the Bubbling Under Hot 100 Singles chart in the US and as well as #15 in Belgium. Phoenix released a remix edition of the album later in 2009, with two of the tracks being "Lisztomania" remixes by Alex Metric and 25 Hrs a Day. The song came in at #4 in the Triple J Hottest 100, 2009, making Phoenix the first French band to finish in the top 5 of the Hottest 100.

== Etymology ==
The term Lisztomania was used by Heinrich Heine to describe the intense fan frenzy directed toward Franz Liszt during his performances. The video to the song shows the band visiting the Franz Liszt Museum in Bayreuth.

== In popular culture ==
The song was the soundtrack of a 2009 video meme that featured individuals reenacting the dance scene from the 1985 film The Breakfast Club. One video created by Boston University students gained new attention in 2019 due to the participation of future U.S. Representative Alexandria Ocasio-Cortez.

"Lisztomania" appears on the soundtrack of the video game Major League Baseball 2K10.

An instrumental, faux-classical version of the song was used as the theme music for the Amazon series Mozart in the Jungle.

The band performed the song on stage on 11 August 2024 during the closing ceremony of the 2024 Summer Olympics.

== In law ==
In August 2013, Lawrence Lessig brought suit against Liberation Music PTY Ltd., after Liberation issued a takedown notice of one of Lessig's lectures on YouTube which had used the song by Phoenix, whom Liberation Music represents. Lessig sought damages under section 512(f) of the Digital Millennium Copyright Act, which holds parties liable for misrepresentations of infringement or removal of material. Lessig was represented by the Electronic Frontier Foundation and Jones Day. In February 2014, the case ended with a settlement in which Liberation Music admitted wrongdoing in issuing the takedown notice, issued an apology, and paid a confidential sum in compensation.

== Track listing ==
Side A

1. "Lisztomania" – 4:08
2. "Lisztomania" (Alex Metric Remix) – 5:05

Side B

1. "Lisztomania" (Yuksek Remix) – 5:08
2. "Lisztomania" (A Fight for Love/25 Hours a Day Remix)

== Charts ==
=== Weekly charts ===
Chart (2009–2010)	Peak position
Belgium (Ultratip Bubbling Under Flanders)	15
Belgium (Ultratip Bubbling Under Wallonia)	16
Canada Rock Songs (Billboard)	23
Japan (Japan Hot 100)	71
Switzerland Airplay (Schweizer Hitparade)	56
US Bubbling Under Hot 100 (Billboard)	11
US Alternative Airplay (Billboard)	4
US Hot Rock & Alternative Songs (Billboard)	5

Chart (2024)	Peak position
France (SNEP)	131
Germany Download (Official German Charts)	41
Japan Hot Overseas (Billboard Japan)	19
UK Singles Downloads (Official Charts)	85
UK Singles Sales (OCC)	89

=== Year-end charts ===
Chart (2010)	Position
US Hot Rock & Alternative Songs (Billboard)	10

== Certifications ==
Region	Certification	Certified units/sales
New Zealand (RMNZ)	Gold	15,000^{‡}
United Kingdom (BPI)	Silver	200,000^{‡}
United States (RIAA)	Platinum	1,000,000^{‡}
^{‡} Sales+streaming figures based on certification alone.
