= Luke List =

Luke List may refer to:

- Luke List (golfer) (born 1985), American professional golfer
- Luke List (cricketer) (born 1977), former English cricketer
