= Marcel Bouteron =

French librarian and historian

Marcel Bouteron (3 August 1877, in Le Mans – 9 July 1962, in Vence) was a French librarian and literary historian, who specialized in Balzac studies.

From 1901 he studied at the École Nationale des Chartes in Paris, receiving the degree of archiviste paléographe in 1905. In 1934 he was named director of the Bibliothèque de l'Institut de France, and from 1941 served as inspector general of libraries and archives. In 1940 he became a member of the Académie des sciences morales et politiques.

With Henri Longnon, he was editor of the complete works of Balzac, titled Œuvres complètes de Honoré de Balzac (40 volumes, 1912–40).
