= EVIA Digital Archive Project =

Archives of ethnographic field video

Coordinates: 39°09′56″N 86°31′11″W

- Producer: Indiana University and the University of Michigan (United States)
- History: 2001 - present
- Languages: English

Coverage
- Disciplines: Ethnography
- Format coverage: Video

Links
- Website: eviada.webhost.iu.edu

The Ethnographic Video for Instruction and Analysis (EVIA) Digital Archive Project is a collaborative project that aims to create a digital registry of ethnographic field video for use by instructors and scholars. It is a collection of digitized, unedited videos which represent ethnographic research and its corresponding scholarly documentation. Collections gathered by the EVIA Project include a diverse range of traditions from around the world.

== Overview ==
The EVIA Digital Archive Project's central purpose is to create a repository of ethnographic video and a framework of tools and systems to support librarians, archivists, and scholars in ethnographic instruction. EVIA Project specifically focuses on topics such as anthropology, dance ethnology ethnomusicology, and folklore. The primary mission of EVIA Project is preserving ethnographic videos that were created by scholars while conducting their research. The secondary goal is to make the content generated by the project available with descriptive annotations, and ultimately, creating a distinct database for scholars, instructors, and students to refer to.

== History ==
Funding for the Ethnographic Video for Instruction and Analysis (EVIA) Digital Archive Project began in 2001 by the Andrew W. Mellon Foundation and further included contributions from Indiana University and University of Michigan. It was originally conceived as the “Ethnomusicological Video for Instruction and Analysis Digital Archive”, but moved toward a broader ethnographic center that altered the meaning of its acronym.

In 2001, the first formal efforts of Digital Archive Project surfaced as their initial planning phases began. Team members which included ethnomusicologists, intellectual property specialists, and digital and video technologists from Indiana University, the University of Michigan, Harvard University, and Ohio State University were all involved in planning workshops trying to resolve issues such as geographic coverage, technical challenges, and ethical issues surrounding the EVIA Project. At the end of the year, team members presented their proposal for the project to the Andrew W. Mellon Foundation and succeeded in receiving funding.

In 2009, EVIA Project began working on moving away from their dependence on Mellon Foundation and move more toward a model of sustainability to generate income and financial support from users and institutions, as well as, acquire supplementary income from additional grants and subscription fees from individuals and institutions. Currently, EVIA Project’s work focuses on establishing markets for its products and services and developing efficient means to serve clientele.

== The archive ==
EVIA Project utilizes both physical and digital storage systems. EVIA Project operates out of the Archives of Traditional Music at Indiana University, one of the oldest and largest university-based ethnographic sound archives in the United States. Physical tapes, whether they are a Digital Betacam preservation master or original copies, are maintained in a temperature and humidity-controlled vault of the Archives of Traditional Music.

Digital files, whether they are the original recordings or preservation transfers from the original, are stored in Indiana University's Mass Data Storage System (MDSS). They are governed as a partnership between the Archives of Traditional Music, The EVIA Project, and the Digital Library Program at Indiana University. Any metadata gathered about the recordings as part of the EVIA deposition undertakings are maintained in a FEDORA archive generated by EVIA Project and maintained as part of the Digital Library Program at Indiana.
