= Betty Liste =

American jazz pianist

Betty Liste is an American jazz pianist. She performs regularly in New York and New Jersey, and has worked with jazz musicians such as Ted Curson (who is on her first recording) and Richie Cole and jazz vocalist Bill Robinson. Liste's style falls into the modern mainstream of jazz.

== Early years ==
Born in Jersey City, New Jersey, Liste studied as a youth with jazz pianist Kenny Barron. She made her professional debut performing at Gulliver's and Three Sisters in New Jersey in 1978. The following year she began playing in small Greenwich Village clubs and has since become a consistent performer in both the New York and New Jersey jazz scenes.

== Career ==
In 2012, she performs regularly at the Stony Hill Inn and at Trumpet's Jazz Club in New Jersey, leading a vocal jam session at the latter. In addition to performing, Liste taught jazz piano, ear training and functional piano at Montclair State University for eight years. She also started a children's piano program at Montclair and has taught at William Paterson University and Manhattan College.

Liste has performed at Lincoln Center and the Montreal Jazz Festival. She has performed with altoist Richie Cole, trumpeter Ted Curson, tenor-saxophonist Don Braden, guitarists Harry Leahey and Stanley Jordan, bassists Jon Burr, Brian Bromberg and Chip Jackson, drummers Billy Hart and Eliot Zigmund, and accompanied singer Mark Murphy. In the early 1980s, she performed with New Orleans vocalist Betty Shirley and collaborated with her to write several songs including the song "Jazz Waltz" which is performed frequently in New York City clubs and at the Montreal Jazz Festival. Liste has recorded two CDs. The first was 2006's Pensive Moments with Ted Curson. A Jazz Times reviewer wrote that "Pensive Moments impresses with its lively, creative performances and overall classy presentation". Her second CD, Jazz Ventures, was released in 2010. A reviewer for All About Jazz wrote "Liste interprets the timeless masterworks of Cole Porter, Miles Davis, and Antonio Carlos Jobim, among others, with youthful exuberance, emotional depth, and impressive skill."
