= Liszt (surname) =

Last Name Liszt

Liszt is a Hungarian surname that means 'flour'.

Notable people with the surname include:

- Franz Liszt (1811–1886), Hungarian composer and pianist
  - Adam Liszt (1776–1827), father of composer and pianist Franz Liszt
  - Anna Liszt (1788–1866), mother of Franz Liszt
  - Cosima Liszt (1837–1930), daughter of Franz Liszt and later the wife of Richard Wagner
  - Franz von Liszt (1851–1919), German jurist and cousin of Franz Liszt
- Catherine A. Liszt, pen name of Janet Hardy

== See also ==
- 3910 Liszt, main-belt asteroid, named after the composer Franz Liszt
- List (surname), a predominantly German, identical sounding surname that may be a simplification of Liszt (or vice versa, the latter a Magyarized version of the former)
- László Listi, sometimes spelled Liszt, Hungarian baron and poet sometimes associated with other Liszt families, but without any substantial proof.
- András Liszt, ennobled 1719
- Liszt families from Sopron in 14th century according to István Csekey
