= Rzewuski =

Rzewuski (female: Rzewuska) is a Polish surname. Many, but not all people named Rzewuski belong to the noble Rzewuski family.

== Notable people with the name ==
- Adam Rzewuski (1801–1888), Polish-Russian general
- Alexander Rzewuski (1893–1983), Polish-Russian Catholic clergyman
- Alexandra Francis Rzewuska (1788–1865), Polish aristocrat, artist and writer
- Ewelina Rzewuska (1805–1882), Polish noblewoman
- Franciszek Michał Rzewuski (1730–1800), Polish nobleman
- Henryk Rzewuski (1791–1866), Polish Romantic-era journalist and novelist
- Jan Rzewuski (1916–1994), Polish theoretical physicist
- Lech Rzewuski (1941–2004), Polish painter
- Ludwika Maria Rzewuska (1744–1816), Polish noblewoman
- Marta Rzewuska-Frankowska (1889–1954), Polish anthropologist and teacher
- Michał Florian Rzewuski (died 1687), Polish–Lithuanian nobleman and politician
- Seweryn Rzewuski (1743–1811), Polish-Lithuanian szlachcic
- Stanisław Ferdynand Rzewuski (1737–1786), Polish noble (szlachcic)
- Stanisław Mateusz Rzewuski (1642–1728), Polish noble (szlachcic)
- Wacław Rzewuski (1705–1779), Polish drama writer, poet, and military commander
- Wacław Seweryn Rzewuski, (1784–1831) Polish explorer, poet, orientalist and horse expert
- Walery Rzewuski (1837–1888), Polish photographer

== See also ==
- Rzewuski family (nobility)
- Stare Rzewuski, large village in Gmina Przesmyki, Siedlce County, Masovian Voivodeship, Poland
