= Gawęda (disambiguation) =

Gawęda is a narrative genre of Polish folklore and literature.

Gawęda may also refer to:

- Gawęda szlachecka is often referred to as simply gawęda
- Gawęda (surname), Polish surname
- Gawęda (band), Polish band
