= Pidhirtsi Castle =

17th-century castle in Ukraine

Coordinates: 49.9431°N 24.9835°E

- Підгорецький замок
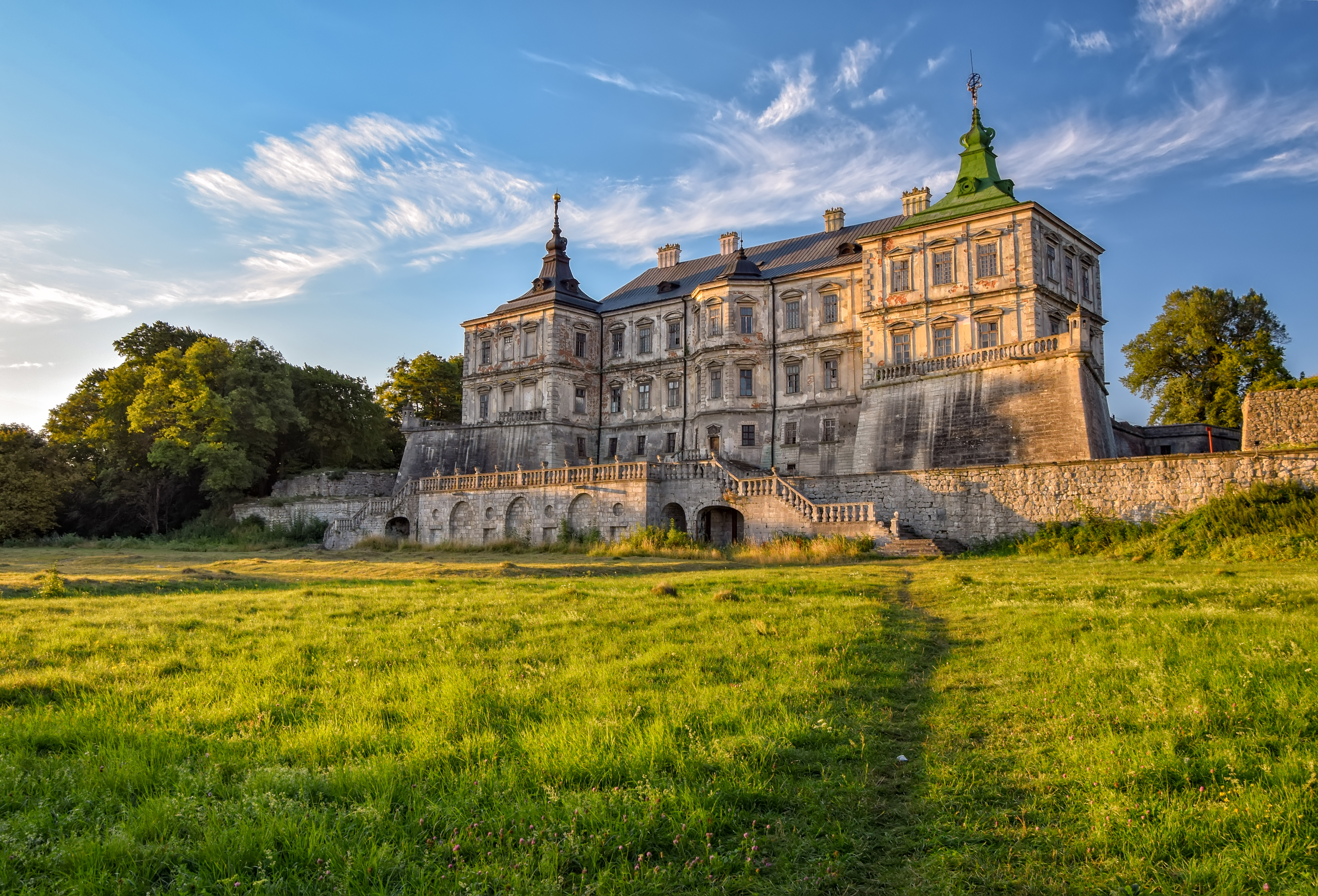
- The palace in 2015

General information
- Status: State Register of Immovable Landmarks of Ukraine
- Location: Pidhirtsi, Zolochiv Raion, Lviv Oblast, Ukraine
- Year built: 1635

Design and construction
- Architects: Guillaume Le Vasseur de Beauplan, Andrea del Aqua

Immovable Monument of National Significance of Ukraine
- Official name: Замок (Castle)
- Type: Architecture
- Reference no.: 130087/1

The Pidhirtsi Castle (Ukrainian: Підгорецький замок, romanized: Pidhorets'kyi zamok; Polish: zamek w Podhorcach) is a residential castle-fortress located in the village of Pidhirtsi in Lviv Oblast (province) western Ukraine, located eighty kilometers east of Lviv.

It was constructed by Guillaume Le Vasseur de Beauplan between 1635 and 1640 by order of the Polish–Lithuanian Commonwealth's Grand Crown Hetman Stanisław Koniecpolski, on the place of the older fortress. The castle was then part of the property of the Crown of the Kingdom of Poland, and it is regarded as the most valuable of the palace-garden complexes in the eastern borderlands (Kresy Wschodnie) of the former Polish–Lithuanian Commonwealth.

Today, it is part of the Lviv National Art Gallery.

== Exterior ==
The structure, built with brick and stone, was designed in the characteristic palazzo in fortezza style. It is located on the northern side of the Woroniaki hills, standing at 399 meters above sea level, overlooking the Styr River valley, in a prominent location where it can be seen from great distances. The palace itself is built into the slope of the hill. In the 17th century, it was surrounded by vineyards and Italian-style parterre gardens, its wine celebrated by the poetry of Jakub Sobieski and Andrzej Morsztyn. The castle is guarded by a moat and drawbridge, and fortified walls with bastions. It also boasted iron cannons, some of which have been preserved to this day. The castle takes the form of an open square of nearly 100 meters per side, with three floors.

Its western part served as an official residency for guests; the eastern wing was private, reserved for the owner and servants. Above the entrance gate, a marble plaque to this day bears a Latin inscription: "A crown of military labours is victory, victory is a triumph, triumph is rest." There also was a grange, a private zoo, vineyards, an apiary, a trout pond and a mill.

== Interior ==
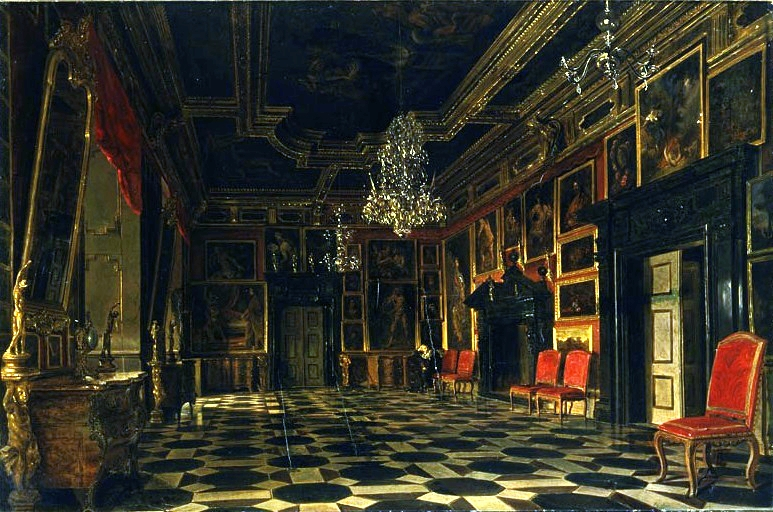
The Crimson Room (1871), painting by Aleksander Gryglewski

In its heyday under Jakub Ludwik Sobieski, the castle was richly furnished, with several halls and a library, and with gardens and parks around it. Next to the entrance was the Guardroom, then there was the knights' room, filled with hussar equipment and numerous kinds of weaponry. There followed the suite of the Crimson Room, a Chinese Room, the Mirror Room, Yellow Room, Green Room (in which 106 paintings of the 18th century painter Szymon Czechowicz were kept) and a chapel. These rooms collected the names from the color of a trim or from what was kept in them.

Walls of all rooms were covered with paintings, portraits (around 200 of them), wallpapers; floors were made of marble tiles. Each room also had a marble fireplace. Among the stylish furnishings, there were numerous examples from the booty taken by Stanisław Koniecpolski during wars with the Turks and Tatars, mostly Persian rugs and Turkish tents. In the library, there was an archive of the Koniecpolski and Rzewuski family. King Wladyslaw IV Vasa and his French wife Ludwika Maria Gonzaga, were impressed by the complex, when they visited it in early 1646. Soon after their visit, Stanisław Koniecpolski died.

== History ==
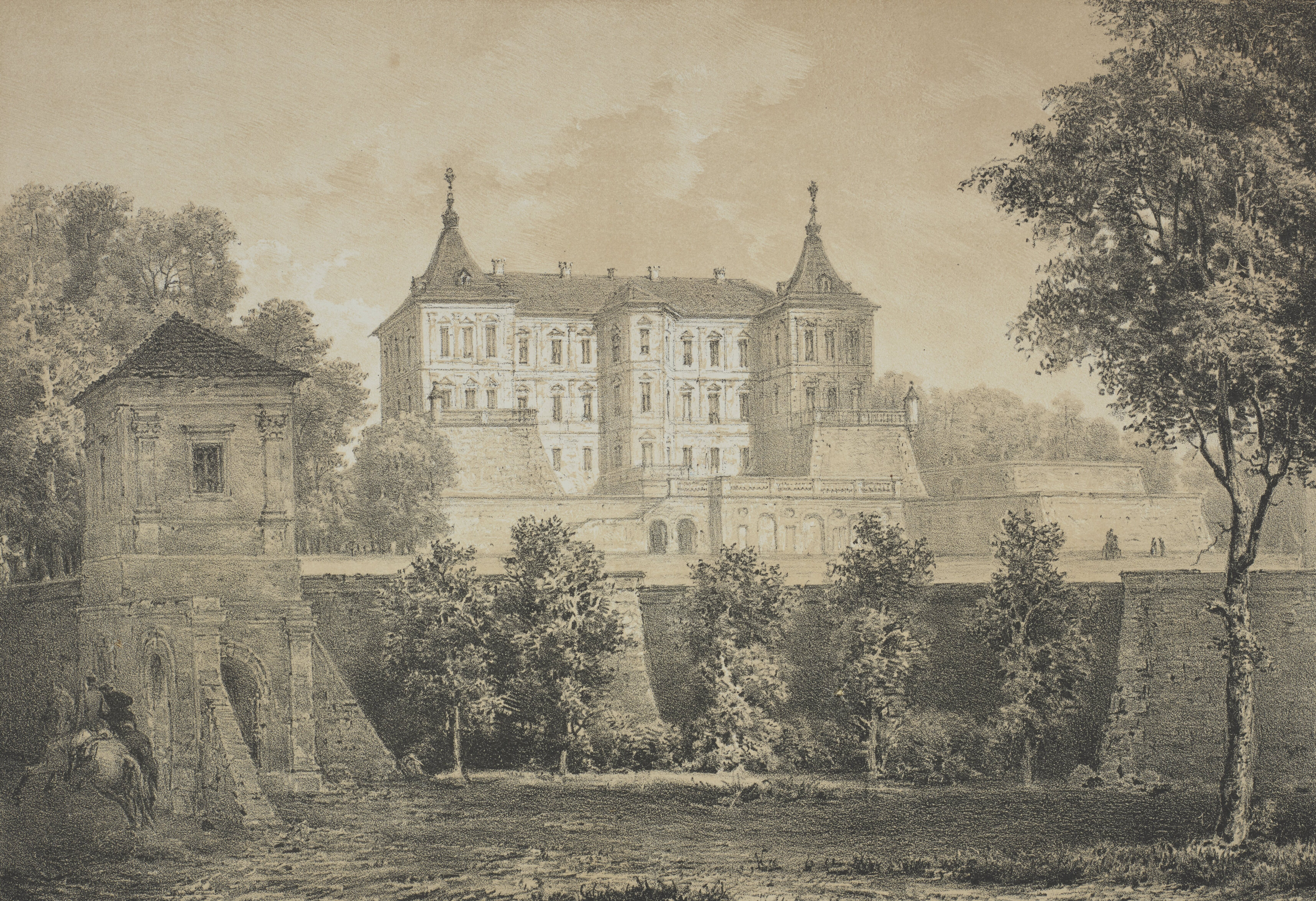
Napoleon Orda, castle in Pidhirtsi

It has not been established who designed the complex, that, most probably, was planned by Italian architect Andrea del Aqua, who also designed the fortress in nearby Brody for the bellicose Koniecpolski. Hetman Koniecpolski wrote in his memoirs that he wanted to own a place for relaxation, but the castle location made relaxation impossible. In 1648 it was attacked by Ukrainian Cossacks during Khmelnytskyi Uprising, although they could not capture the complex, as it was a genuine fortress. Three years later the Cossacks returned and failed again. After this event, Koniecpolski's son Aleksander repaired the damage and strengthened the fortifications. The improved security is credited with the resistance of the castle to numerous Tatar and Turkish attacks that took place in a period of second half of 17th century.

In 1682, Stanisław Koniecpolski, grandson of the original builder and owner, decided to bequeath the castle with surrounding estates to Jakub Ludwik Sobieski. Five years later, Jakub Sobieski coming back from the campaign against the Ottoman Turks at Kamieniec Podolski hosted his parents, King Jan III Sobieski and his French wife Marie Casimire Louise, in the castle. A description of the Podhorce complex made by one of Sobieski's courtiers, François d'Aleyrac, has been preserved: "This castle is undoubtedly the most beautiful in Poland, and in other countries, it would also be regarded unique."

In 1725 Konstanty Sobieski, younger brother of Jakub, sold the castle to the Great Crown Hetman Stanislaw Rzewuski. After hetman Rzewuski's death, the complex was inherited by his son, Wacław, who also was the owner of the nearby Olesko Castle. Wacław Rzewuski made Podhorce his permanent residence. He ordered that a third floor be added, as well as a church (1788); he opened a theater.

Wacław Rzewuski was deeply interested in all things connected to King Jan III Sobieski. He purchased such items as Sobieski's sword used in the Battle of Vienna, booty taken by the king after the battle, as well as a marble table on which, according to legend, Sobieski was baptized . In 1767 Rzewuski went to Warsaw to participate in the debates of the Sejm. Arrested by the Russians and sent to Kaluga, he never returned to Podhorce. After the Partition of Poland, 1772, the castle became part of Austria remaining in the ownership of Rzewuski family (Seweryn Rzewuski and his descendants), although parts of the precious collections of the contents were auctioned by the Austrian-imposed administrator, and the grand interior damaged when Wacław was imprisoned by Russians.

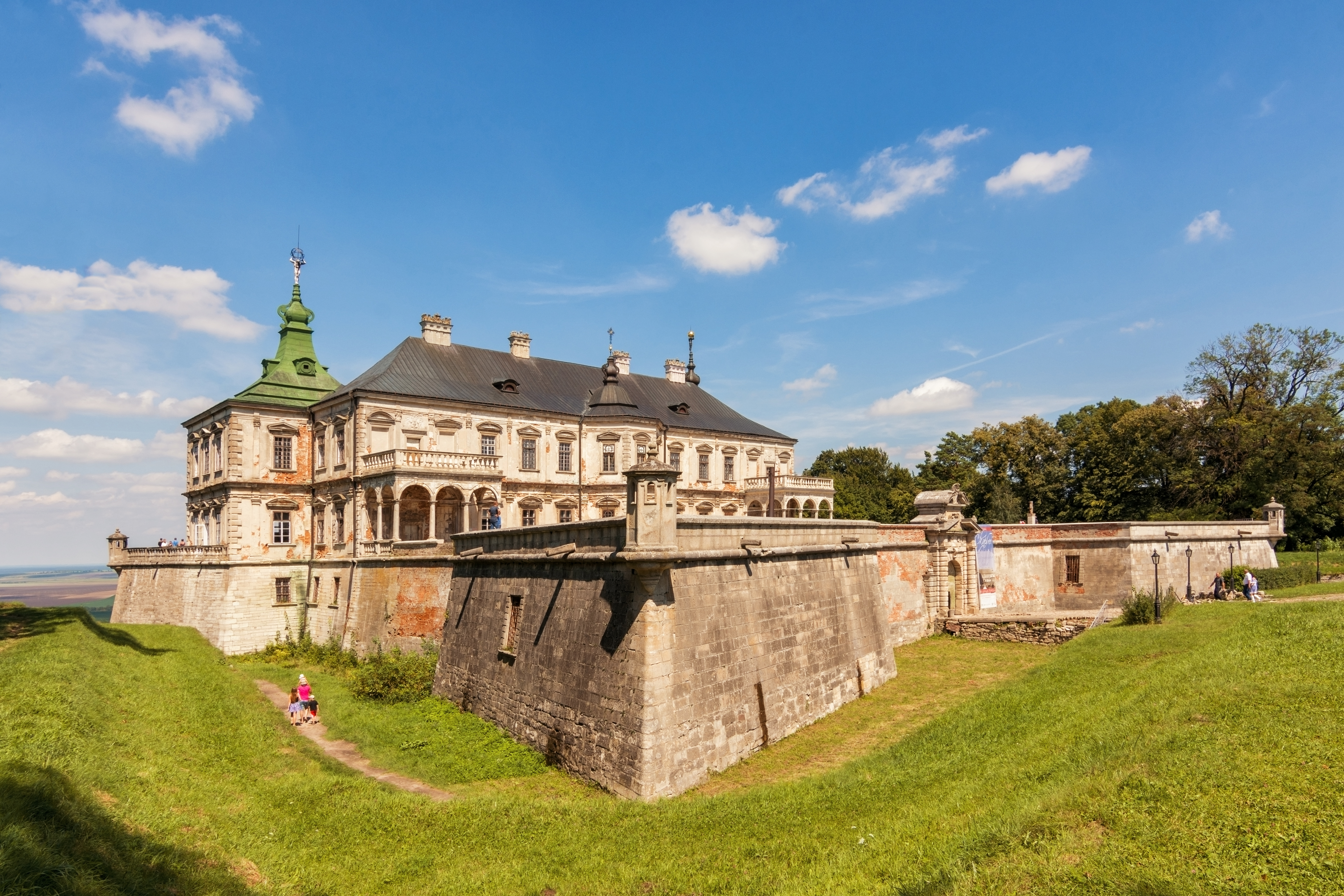
The castle

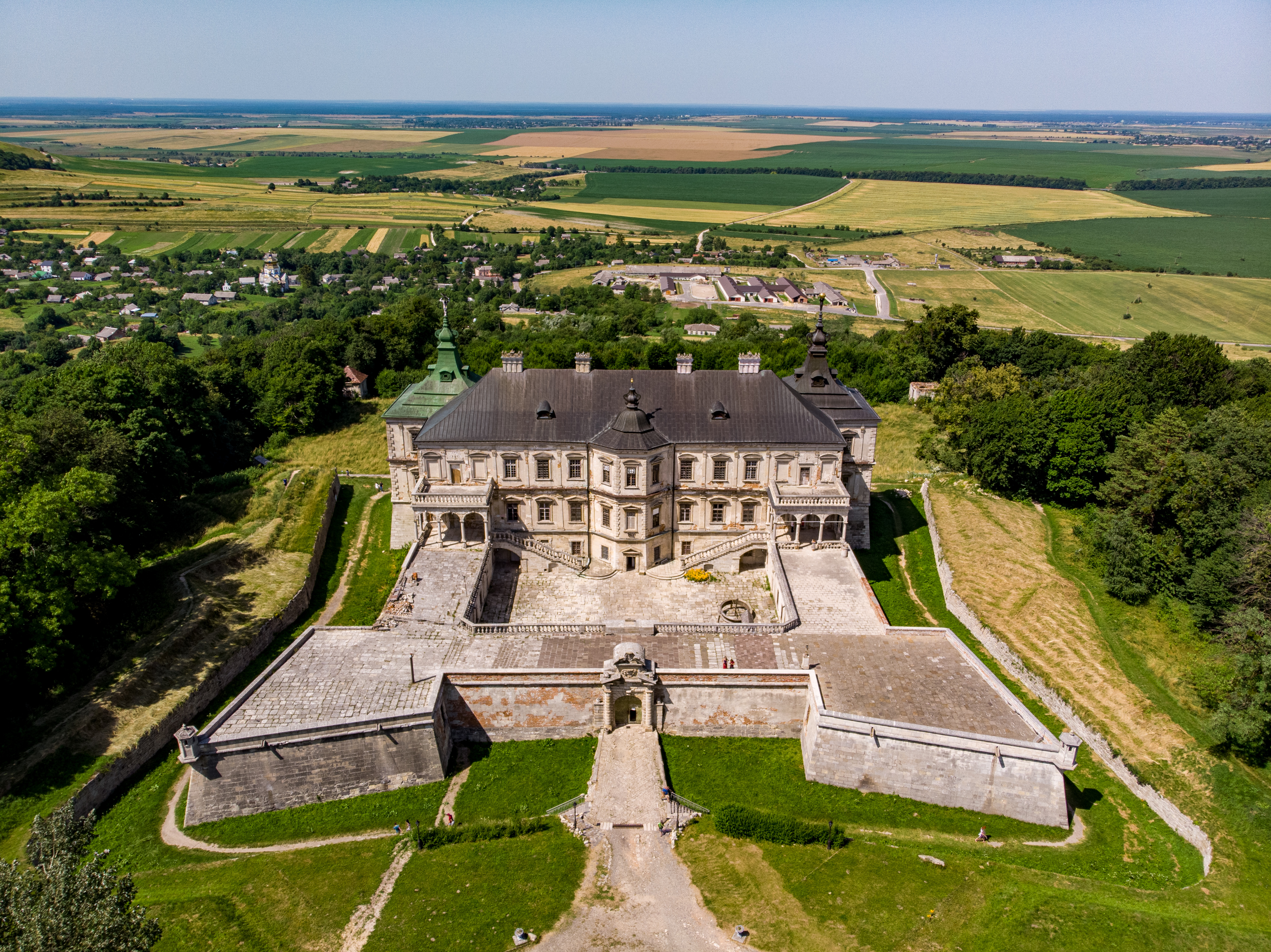
Aerial view

Until 1869 the complex still belonged to the Rzewuski family. Here they hosted Emperor Franz Josef I, and here Euzebiusz Słowacki, the father of Juliusz Słowacki was born. The last male descendant of hetman Wacław Rzewuski, Count Leon Rzewuski, being childless, bequeathed the castle to prince Wladyslaw Sanguszko.

During World War I, the castle was captured by the Russians, who did not destroy it, but looted most of the precious items from it. In the summer of 1915 Pidhirtsi became headquarters of the Fifth Austrian-Hungarian Corps. As it was located on the front line, the threat of destruction by Russian artillery was very real. Fortunately, General Aleksei Brusilov decided to spare the complex; however it was ransacked again by the Russians. Russian soldiers destroyed its interior: walls, tiles and floors. In the Polish-Soviet War the castle was damaged yet again, and, after the conflict, it became part of the Tarnopol Voivodeship (Second Polish Republic), belonging to Prince Roman Sanguszko, who was the last Polish owner of the castle.

In the Polish September Campaign of 1939, following the Nazi and Soviet attack on Poland, anticipating loss of property, Prince Sanguszko packed most of the valuables, took them to Romania, and later to São Paulo in Brazil, where he created a fund. After World War II, Soviet authorities opened a tuberculosis sanitarium in the castle.

In February 1956 the castle almost completely burned down, including valuable paintings; the fire lasted for three weeks, leaving behind only walls and $12 million in damages. In 1997 it was purchased by the Lviv Gallery of Painting, which turned it into a museum.

The castle, despite all the damage rendered during the Communist rule, has always been an interesting and attractive architectural object. Several movies were made in Pidhirtsi, including shots in Potop.

When Ukraine regained independence from the Soviet Union, it was planned for the castle to be restored and made into a presidential residence. This never came about, and eventually the property was placed in the jurisdiction of the Lviv National Art Gallery. Currently, part of the Rzewuski family collection is kept in the Lviv Historical Museum and Lviv Art Gallery. Some artifacts are also kept in museums in Tarnów and Kraków. The Lviv National Art Gallery is trying to restore the castle to its historical look. However, lack of funds has delayed the restoration work, and progress is only being made slowly.

== In popular culture ==
Pidhirtsi Castle was featured on season 6, episode 8 of the TV series, Mysteries of the Abandoned titled "The Thing on Hell Mountain", which aired on the Science Channel, on May 14, 2020. The episode tells the tale of the castle in the 18th century, and of its second owner Waclaw Rzewuski, who hid many secrets in the dark, dank dungeons. It is believed that, driven by suspicion and jealousy, he killed his fiancée Maria Rzewuski, a beautiful 16-year-old girl who constantly cheated on him. Though her body was never found, It is said that her spirit never found peace and that her ghost haunts the corridors, along with other lost souls.

The end of each game session of Trivia Murder Party 2, the game from The Jackbox Party Pack 6, features a photo of the Pidhirtsi Castle, depicted as the mysterious killer's hotel from which players try to escape by answering trivia questions.
