= Stanisław Rzewuski =

Stanisław Rzewuski may refer to:

- Stanisław Mateusz Rzewuski (1662–1728), Polish nobleman
- Stanisław Ferdynand Rzewuski (1737–1786), Polish nobleman
