= 1788 Polish-Lithuanian legislative election =

1788 Polish-Lithuanian Sejm election
- 18 August 1788

All 177 seats in the Chamber of Deputies 89 seats were needed for a majority
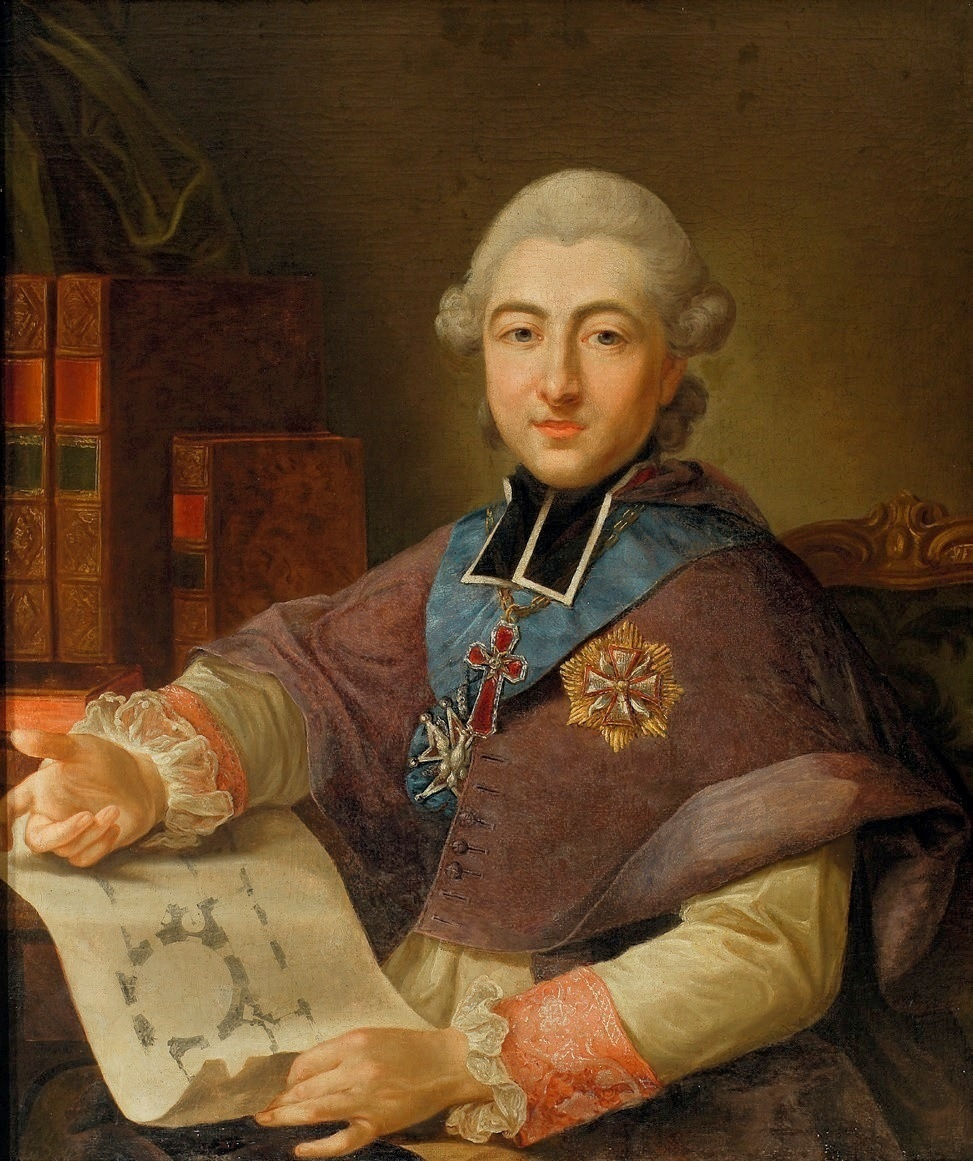

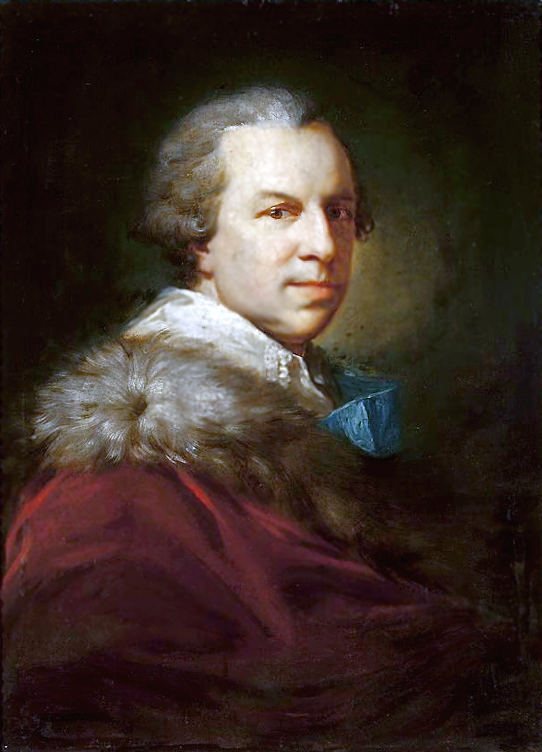
	Majority party	Minority party
Leader	Michał Jerzy Poniatowski	Stanisław Szczęsny Potocki
Party	Patriotic Party	Hetmans' Party
Leader's seat	Did not stand	Did not stand
Seats won	93	68
Marshal before election
Stanisław Kostka Gadomski
Hetmans' Party
Elected Marshal
Stanisław Małachowski
Patriotic Party

The 1788 election held in the Polish–Lithuanian Commonwealth marked one of the most crucial events in the history of both countries prior to 1795. The elections returned a significant pro-reform camp to the Sejm of the Polish–Lithuanian Commonwealth chosen to repair the Commonwealth's political system and prevent the country from collapsing. The Sejm that emerged as a result of the election has been dubbed the Great Sejm.

== Background ==
The election was called by the King in May 1788 and the Sejmiks gathered to elect the deputies in August. The Sejm gathered on 28 September.

== Sejmik Districts ==
#	Constituency	Voivodeship	Deputies
1	Kraków	Kraków	8
2	Poznań	Poznań	8
3	Vilnius	Vilnius	2
4	Ashmyany	Vilnius	2
5	Lida	Vilnius	2
6	Vilkmergė	Vilnius	2
7	Braslaw	Vilnius	2
8	Sandomierz	Sandomierz	7
9	Kalisz	Kalisz	8
10	Trakai	Trakai	2
11	Hrodna	Trakai	2
12	Kaunas	Trakai	2
13	Upytė	Trakai	2
14	Sieradz	Sieradz	4
15	Wieluń	Sieradz	2
16	Łęczyca	Łęczyca	4
17	Samogitia	Samogitia	6
18	Brześć Kujawski	Brześć Kujawski	2
19	Kiev	Kiev	6
20	Inowrocław	Inowrocław	4
21	Chełm	Ruthenia	2
22	Volhynia	Volhynia	6
23	Podolia	Podolia	6
24	Smolensk	Smolensk	4
25	Lublin	Lublin	6
26	Polotsk	Polotsk	2
27	Navahrudak	Navahrudak	2
28	Slonim	Navahrudak	2

#	Constituency	Voivodeship	Deputies
29	Vawkavysk	Navahrudak	2
30	Płock	Płock	4
31	Vitebsk	Vitebsk	2
32	Czersk	Masovia	2
33	Warsaw	Masovia	2
34	Wizna	Masovia	2
35	Wyszogród	Masovia	2
36	Zakroczym	Masovia	2
37	Ciechanów	Masovia	2
38	Łomża	Masovia	2
39	Różan	Masovia	2
40	Liw	Masovia	2
41	Nur	Masovia	2
42	Drohiczyn	Podlachia	2
43	Bielsk Podlaski	Podlachia	2
44	Mielnik	Podlachia	2
45	Rawa Mazowiecka	Rawa Mazowiecka	2
46	Sochaczew	Rawa Mazowiecka	2
47	Gostynin	Rawa Mazowiecka	2
48	Brest-Litovsk	Brest-Litovsk	2
49	Pinsk	Brest-Litovsk	2
50	Bratslav	Bratslav	6
51	Minsk	Minsk	2
52	Mazyr	Minsk	2
53	Rechytsa	Minsk	2
54	Livonia	Livonia	6
55	Chernihiv	Chernihiv	4
--	Total	--	177

== See also ==
- History of Poland in the Early Modern era (1569–1795)
- Great Sejm
