= Ludwik Sztyrmer =

Polish novelist, literary critic and soldier

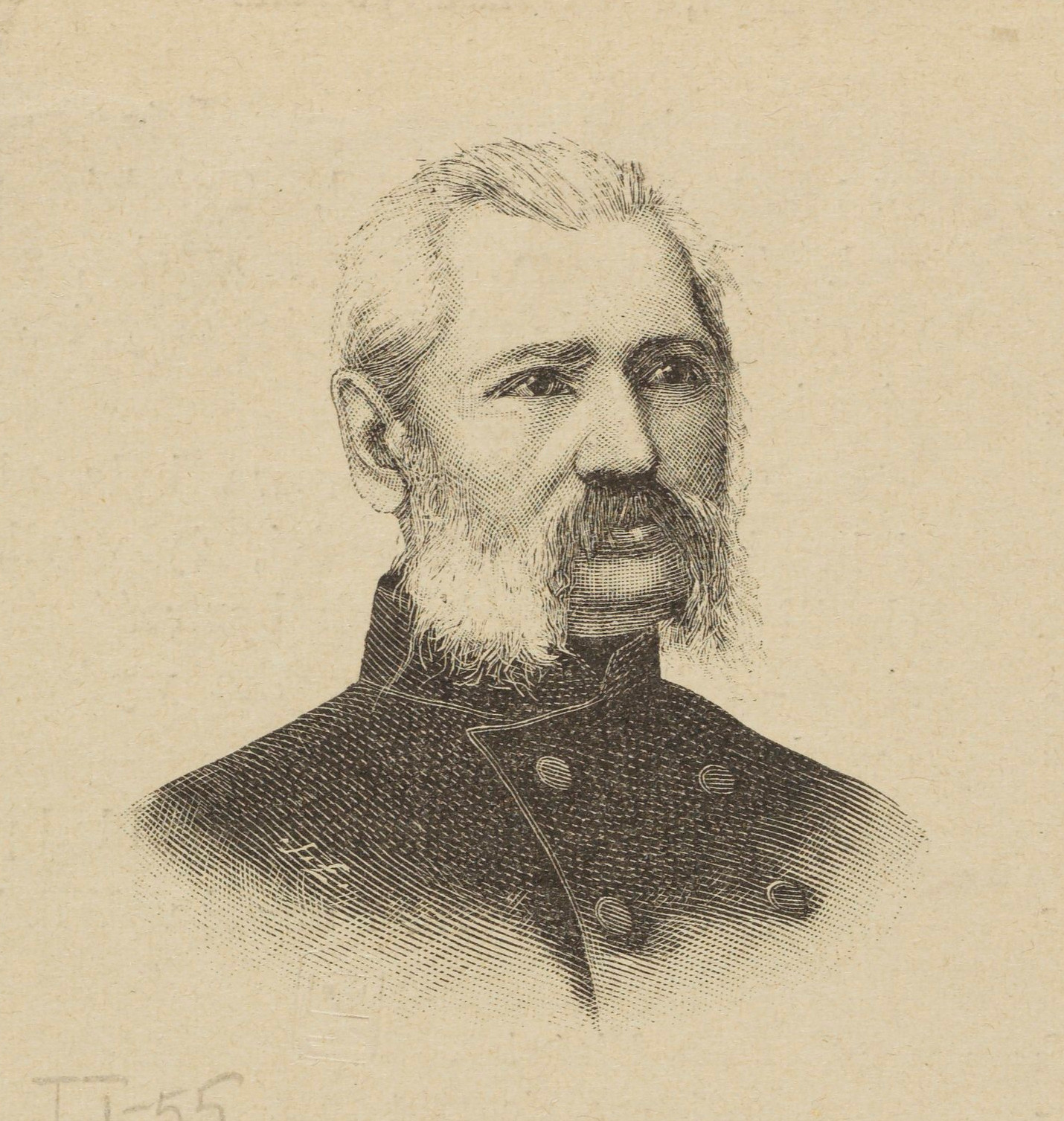
Portrait of Ludwik Sztyrmer

Ludwik Sztyrmer (30 April 1809, in Płońsk – 4 June 1886, in Lentvaris) was a Polish novelist, literary critic and soldier.

He was born in Plonsk, the son of Jacob Stürmer, a military doctor of German origin, and Julianna Linkowski, his second wife. In 1824, he graduated from the cadet corps in Kalisz, and in 1829 from the military school in Warsaw. During his time at the school, he developed an interest in literature, reading the French classics and romantic poetry. He also learned foreign languages, and was able to read in French, German and English. In 1830 he released his first publication, a psychological essay about animal magnetism. He participated in the November Uprising. In the Battle of Grochow in 1831 he was taken prisoner by the Russians and sent to Wiatka (now Kirov).

In 1832 he joined the Russian army. During the years 1832 to 1834 he served in Finland. During his stay there he wrote a diary, now preserved only in fragments. In 1834, he enrolled in the military academy in St. Petersburg. Around 1838 he married Eleanor Janowska. During the 1840s, he published fiction, mostly under the name of his wife Eleanor Sztyrmer. He wrote a series of strange novellas, mostly centered around the character of Mr. Pantofel (or Mr. Slipper). He was a member of St. Petersburg society during the years 1842 to 1845, and published journalistic pieces in the Weekly Petersburg under the pseudonym "Gerwazy Bomba". During this time, he was friends with Henryk Rzewuski and Józef Emanuel Przecławski, and was a member of the St. Petersburg Coterie, a group of Polish writers of aristocratic origin based in the Russian capital. At the end of his life he suffered from mental illness, and from 1880 onwards, he was completely insane.
