= Soplica (disambiguation) =

Soplica is one of the older brands of Polish vodkas.

Soplica may also refer to:

- A fictional family from the epic Polish poem Pan Tadeusz by Adam Mickiewicz
  - Tadeusz Soplica, titular character
  - Jacek Soplica
  - Judge Soplica
- Seweryn Soplica, literary character created by Henryk Rzewuski: the fictional author of Pamiątki Soplicy (The Memoirs of Soplica)
- Soplica, alias of:
  - Kajetan Stefanowicz (1886–1920), Polish painter
  - Walery Sławek (1879–1939), Polish politician and military officer
