= Gawenda =

Gawenda is a Polish-language surname. Variant: Gawęda; Czech-language variant: Gavenda. Notable people with this surname include:

- Jerzy Gawenda (1917–2000), polish lawyer, politician and statesman
- Husky Gawenda, singer-songwriter and principal writer, lead singer and guitarist of an Australian indie folk band Husky
- Michael Gawenda (born 1947), Australian journalist
