= Kazimierz Nestor Sapieha =

Polish noble and general (1757–1798)

Prince Kazimierz Nestor Sapieha
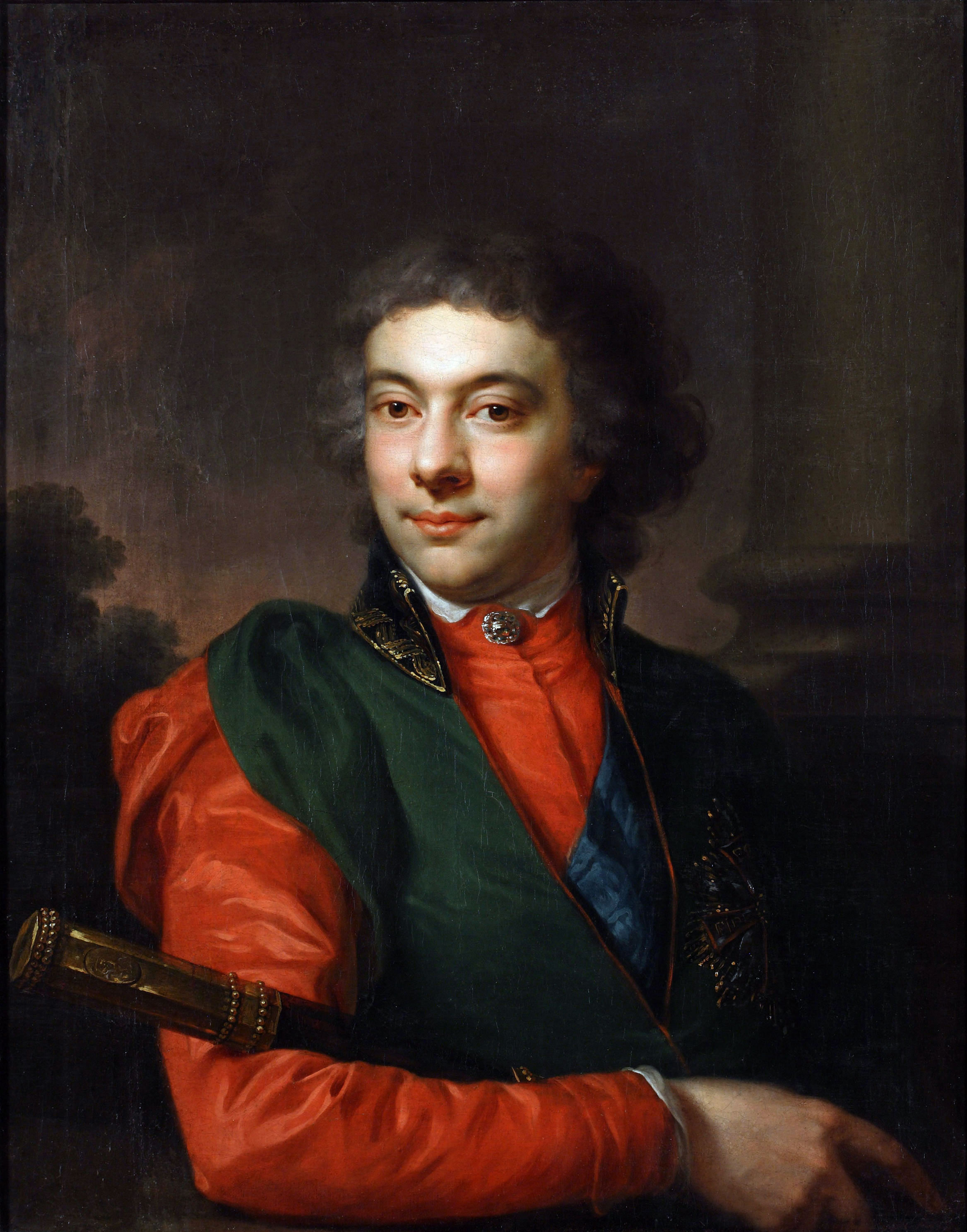
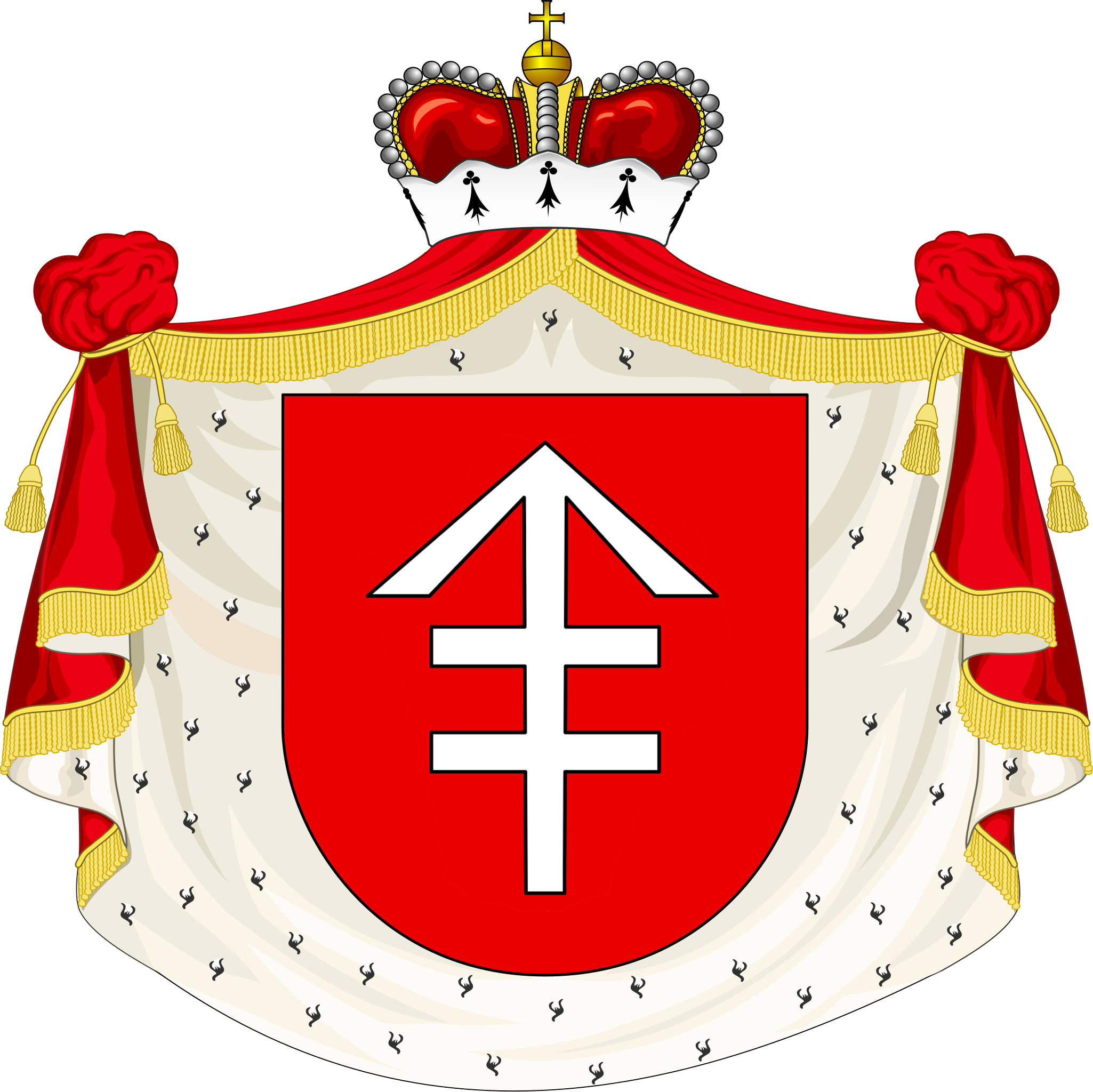
- Portrait by Józef Pitschmann (1787)
- Coat of arms: Lis
- Born: 14 February 1757; Brześć Litewski, Polish–Lithuanian Commonwealth
- Died: 25 May 1798 (aged 41); Vienna, Archduchy of Austria, Holy Roman Empire
- Noble family: Sapieha
- consort: Anna Cetner h. Przerowa
- Father: Jan Sapieha
- Mother: Elżbieta Branicka

Prince Kazimierz Nestor Sapieha (1757–1798) was a Polish-Lithuanian noble (szlachcic) and one of the creators of the 3 May Constitution.

== Biography ==
=== Early life and career ===
Kazimierz Sapieha was educated at the Knight School in Warsaw from 1767 until 1771, and later studied in Italy. Upon his return, he served as Artillery General of Lithuania, from 1773 to 1793. As Deputy from Brzesc Litewski, he participated in several Sejms. Most notably, from 1790, he participated in the Four-Year Sejm in Warsaw, and became Sejm Marshal from 6 October 1788, until 29 May 1792, and Marshal of the Lithuanian Confederation.

=== Politics ===
An early supporter of the magnate opposition to any liberalization (his uncle Hetman Franciszek Ksawery Branicki was its leader), Sapieha changed his position under the influence of Stanisław Małachowski, and became a supporter of reforms, and the 3 May Constitution. He strongly protested, when King Stanisław August Poniatowski joined the Targowica Confederation, and this so angered Sapieha, that he decided to leave Poland. He briefly settled in Dresden. After the outbreak of the Kościuszko Uprising, he returned to his homeland and participated in the uprising, holding the rank of an Artillery Captain. After the Uprising collapsed, he left Poland again and spent the rest of his life in exile in Vienna, where he died in 1798.

== Awards ==
- Knight of the Order of the White Eagle, awarded on 1 January 1779.
