= Elżbieta Branicka =

Polish noble and politician

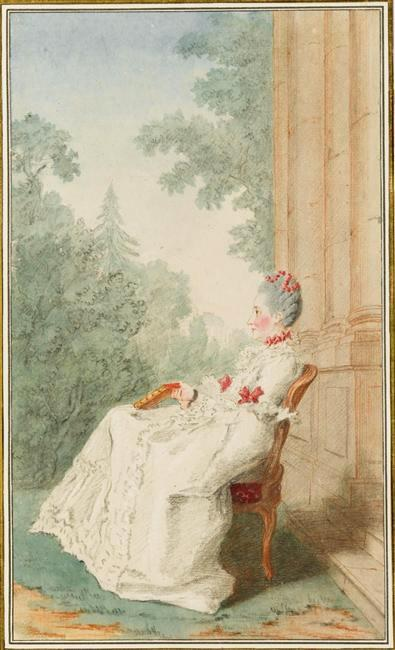
- Coat of arms: Korczak
- Full name: Elżbieta z Branickich Sapieżyna
- Born: c. 1734
- Died: 3 September 1800; Kodeń
- Family: Branicki
- Spouses: 1) Jan Józef Sapieha; 2) Jan Sapieha
- Issue: Kazimierz Nestor Sapieha
- Father: Piotr Branicki
- Mother: Melania Teresa Szembek

Elżbieta Branicka (c. 1734 – 3 September 1800) was a Polish noblewoman (szlachcianka) and politician. She is known for her political career, being the financier of the King Stanisław August Poniatowski prior to his election as king, his adviser in 1763–1776, and as one of the leaders of opposition in 1776–1793. She also had an intimate relationship with the king from 1763 to 1776.

== Life ==
=== Early life ===
She was the daughter of Piotr Branicki, Castellan of Bratslav (1708-1762) and his wife, Melania Teresa Szembek (b. 1712). She was the sister of Count Franciszek Ksawery Branicki.

She married Prince Jan Józef Sapieha in 1753; they divorced in 1755 over his adultery. She remarried Prince Jan Sapieha, a relative of her first spouse, by whom she was widowed in 1757. She was the mother of Prince Kazimierz Nestor Sapieha.

=== Supporter of Poniatowski ===
Elżbieta Branicka was not regarded a beauty, but described as a fascinating and charming woman, intelligent and with a great interest in politics. In 1761, she became an ally of Stanisław August Poniatowski, and gave him a loan of 300.000 zloty, with a great interest, to fund his political career: he was still paying of the debt six years later.

=== Political adviser of Poniatowski ===
Her influence on Poniatowski, both in her capacity as his lover and his moneylender, was well known, and the king included her in his inner circle of advisers and entrusted her with political assignments. In December 1765, for example, the king gave her the task to handle an affair regarding the contract of August Moszyński and the Coinage Commission.

Along with another of the king's mistresses, Magdalena Agnieszka Sapieżyna, Branicka was given an allowance of 200 ducats monthly, which was paid until at least 1775. During the summer of 1766, she was given the task by the king to welcome the famous Madame Geoffrin on her visit to Poland. In a letter from 1768, the king described her as irreplaceable among his "petites amies" (lovers) and called her wonderful, warm, intelligent and an extremely useful ally.

Elżbieta Branicka actively and publicly participated in state affairs and politics. She openly and frequently attended the sessions of the Sejm and the Tribunals and she also participated in the Diet assemblies, with the king's support. Her gender was no formal bar for this activity; within the contemporary Polish system of an aristocratic elective monarchy, her membership within the nobility was the main criteria. She was known to be able to affect the appointment of offices. Despite their opposition to the king's uncles, the Czartoryski family, she and her brother long kept their place in the circle of the king's political advisers. Reportedly, she also used her position to enrich herself and her family.

=== Opposition leader ===
The relationship between Branicka and the king deteriorated during the 1770s. In 1774, her brother, Franciszek Ksawery Branicki, joined the opposition against both the king and the Russian ambassador Stackelberg, with whom Branicka had a bad relationship.

In 1776, after having supported her brother against Stackelberg and the king, she was exiled from the royal court to her estate in Kodeń, with a monthly allowance of 200 ducats. To control her activities, Russian troops were placed on her estate at Kodeń.

During the Sejm of 1776, she filed complaints and demanded the king's debt to her be paid. She engaged in long-going lawsuits with relatives over inheritance and property issues. During these years, she was regarded one of the most notable leaders of the opposition party of the Branicki, Seweryn and Rzewuski families against the king.

During the Great Sejm, she initially sided with the opposition led by Stanisław Szczęsny Potocki against the suggested constitutional changes, and was one of the significant players in Polish political life during the Sejm. She finally supported the Constitution of 3 May 1791. She retired from political life in 1793.

=== Portrayals ===
Elżbieta Branicka was a controversial figure in contemporary Poland, and her activity as a politician, particularly during the Great Sejm, made her the subject of satires, pamphlets and poems by, among others, Ignacy Potocki and Franciszek Zabłocki.
