= Gawęda =

Polish literary genre

Gawęda (Polish pronunciation: [ɡaˈvɛnda]) is a genre of Polish oral folklore, as well as an epic literary genre of works stylized as an oral tale, characterized by freedom of composition, rich in digressions, and written in language close to colloquial language. The word literally means "oral tale".

Melchior Wańkowicz is recognized as a 20th-century representative of the gawęda style, as exemplified by his autobiographical coming of the age novel Tędy i owędy ("Here and There").

== Gawęda szlachecka ==
During the Romantic period, in the first half of the 19th century, the literary genre, the "szlachta gawęda" (gawęda szlachecka) developed. It told of the lives and manners of the nobility, affirming the Sarmatian world of values. The leading author in this genre was Henryk Rzewuski (Pamiątki Soplicy—Memoirs of Soplica, 1839–41). Other authors in this line included K. Gaszyński (Kontuszowe pogadanki—Kontusz Chats), Władysław Syrokomla (Urodzony Jan Dęboróg—Jan Dęboróg), Wincenty Pol (Wieczór przy kominku—An Evening by the Fire), A. Gorczyński, K.W. Wójcicki, and Ignacy Chodźko (Pamiętniki kwestarza—Memoirs of a Collector for Charity).

Gawęda elements may be found in works by Adam Mickiewicz (Pan Tadeusz), Juliusz Słowacki (Preliminaria peregrynacji do Ziemi Świętej JO. księcia Radziwiłła Sierotki—Preliminaries to the Peregrination to the Holy Land of Prince Radziwiłł the Orphan), and in Henryk Sienkiewicz's Trilogy. The szlachta gawęda played a great role in the development of the Polish historical novel.

== See also ==
- Saga
- Skaz, Russian oral tradition
