= Karolina Sobańska =

Polish noblewoman (1795–1885)

Countess Karolina Rozalia Tekla
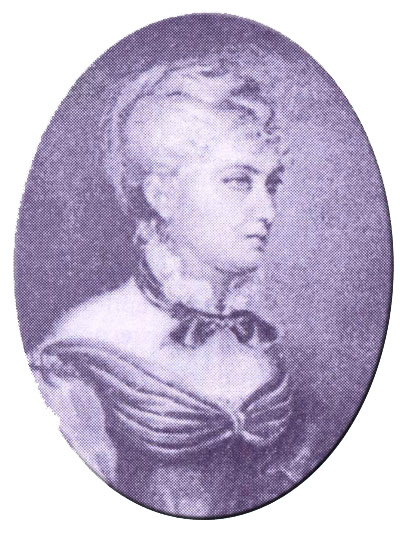
- Coat of arms: Krzywda
- Born: 25 December 1795; Pohrebysche, Makhnovka uezd, Kiev Viceroyalty, Russian Empire
- Died: 21 July 1885 (aged 89); Paris, France
- Noble family: Rzewuski (by birth); House of Sobański (by marriage)
- Consort: Stefan Cerkovic; Hieronim Sobański h. Junosza; Jules Lacroix
- Father: Adam Wawrzyniec Rzewuski
- Mother: Justyna Rdułtowska h. Drogosław

Countess Karolina Rozalia Tekla Sobańska (née Rzewuska; 25 December 1795 – 21 July 1885) was a Polish agent and noblewoman. She was a Russian agent, the mistress of the Tsarist general Jan de Witte (1781–1840) and a reputed lover of Poland's national poet Adam Mickiewicz.

== Life ==
Karolina Sobańska belonged to the well-known szlachta family of Rzewuski. Sister of Ewelina Hańska, wife of Honoré de Balzac.

Karolina's first spouse was a Russian officer, Stefan Cerkovic. In 1814, she married marszałek Hieronim Sobański h. Junosza and had one child: She had one daughter during her second marriage: Kostancja Honorata Sobańska (1814–1838), married to Prince Ksawery Franciszek Sapieha.

During the November Uprising of 1831, Jan de Witte ruled Poland under war laws, and gave her the task to act as a spy in Russian service among to Polish rebels in Dresden and Saxony, a task she reportedly performed well, being able to forward several useful reports to the Russians. Considered a traitor in Russia and not quite trusted by the Russian Czar regardless of her service as a spy, she settled in Paris in France in 1836.

Her third spouse was a Frenchman named Jules Lacroix.

== Bibliography ==
- Polski Słownik Biograficzny t. 39 s. 411
