= Michał Florian Rzewuski =

Polish–Lithuanian nobleman (died 1687)

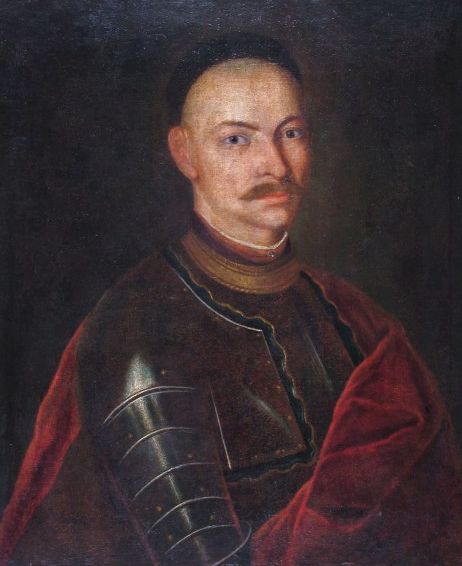
- Coat of arms: Krzywda
- Died: 1687
- Noble family: Rzewuski
- Spouse: Anna Dzierżek h. Nieczuja
- Issue: Stanisław Mateusz Rzewuski; Eleonora Anna Rzewuska
- Father: Stanisław Beydo Rzewuski
- Mother: Anna Czerniejewska h. Korczak

Michał Florian Rzewuski (died 1687) was a Polish–Lithuanian nobleman and politician, who was the podskarbi (treasurer) of the Crown Court.

== Life ==
He moved to Lviv in 1663 and worked there as a writer (1670–1676) and royal colonel from 1674. He served as Treasurer of the Crown Court from 1684, and he was also the starosta of Chełm. A brave knight, he participated in almost all the battles of John II Casimir, contributed to the victory of Chocim, further distinguishing himself in the Turkish wars for Jan III Sobieski.

He died in 1687.

== Children ==
- Stanisław Mateusz Rzewuski (1662–1728), Field and Great Crown Hetman
- Eleonora Anna Rzewuska (born c. 1685), wife of Count Karol Aleksander Krasicki h. Rogala (c.1650–1717)
