= Hetmans' Party =

Hetmans' Party Polish: Stronnictwo hetmańskie
- Leaders: Franciszek Ksawery Branicki; Stanisław Szczęsny Potocki; Seweryn Rzewuski; Kazimierz Nestor Sapieha
- Founded: 1788
- Dissolved: 1795
- Headquarters: Kraków
- Ideology: Anti-Reform; Conservatism; Russophilia (diplomatic)
- Political position: Right-wing

The Hetmans' Party (Polish: Stronnictwo hetmańskie), also known as the Magnates' Party (Stronnictwo magnackie), the Muscovite Party (Stronnictwo moskiewskie), the Conservative Party (Stronnictwo konserwatywne) and the Old-Nobility Party (Stronnictwo staroszlacheckie), was a political party that opposed reforms advocated in the Polish–Lithuanian Commonwealth by the Patriotic Party. The Hetmans' Party was aligned with the Russian Empire and supported preservation of the status quo and the "Golden Freedoms". Its various names come from the fact that it was headed by two hetmans (commanders of Commonwealth military forces), represented the interests of conservative nobles and magnates, and was aligned with the Russian Empire.

== History ==
=== Background ===
By the early 17th century, the magnates of Poland and Lithuania controlled the state—or rather, they managed to ensure that no reforms would be carried out that might weaken their privileged status (the "Golden Freedoms"). The peculiar parliamentary institution of the liberum veto ("free veto") since 1652 had in principle permitted any Sejm deputy to nullify all the legislation that had been adopted by that Sejm. Thanks to this device, deputies bribed by magnates or foreign powers, or simply content to believe they were living in some kind of "Golden Age", for over a century paralyzed the Commonwealth's government. The government was near collapse, giving rise to the term "Polish anarchy".

A major opportunity for reform seemed to present itself during the "Great" or "Four-Year Sejm" of 1788–92, which opened on October 6, 1788. Events in the world now played into the reformers' hands. Poland's neighbors were too occupied with wars — Prussia with France, Russia and Austria with the Ottoman Empire — and with their own internal troubles to intervene forcibly in Poland. The Russian Empire had, since the beginning of the century, been increasingly involved in the Commonwealth politics, and the current situation meant it was paying significantly less attention to the Commonwealth politics. The Patriotic Party was established during the Four-Year Sejm (Great Sejm) of 1788–92 by individuals who sought reforms aimed at strengthening the Polish–Lithuanian Commonwealth and assuring its independence from the Russian Empire. The reforms, however, did not enjoy a unanimous support.

=== The party ===
The Hetmans' Party was formed to oppose the reformers. The Party's most notable members included prominent magnates such as Hetmans Franciszek Ksawery Branicki and Seweryn Rzewuski, as well as Stanisław Szczęsny Potocki and Kazimierz Nestor Sapieha. They wished to preserve the status quo, as the inefficient state machinery meant that the magnates had little, if any, responsibility to the state and were the major power wielders on their lands. They hid their desire for power from the public, and sought support among the lesser, poorer nobility, portraying themselves as defenders of the traditional privileges and freedoms of the Polish nobility (the Golden Liberties) and of the Cardinal Laws. The magnates were not always united, and occasionally fought one another and criticized the Russian influence, though this may have been partly a smokescreen designed to increase their support among the public.

The Magnates were aligned with the Russian Empire and formed two groups, one aided by Russian Ambassador Otto Magnus von Stackelberg, and the other by Grigory Potemkin. Many of them had received financial assistance from the Russians. The Russians wielded substantial influence in the Commonwealth, often by bribing Sejm (parliament) deputies, ensuring that the Commonwealth was unable to threaten Russian state interests. Russia's Empress Catherine II saw the Patriotic Party's reform attempts as a threat to Russian influence in the Commonwealth, and possibly as a long-term danger to absolute monarchy in Russia itself.

=== Aftermath ===
After the Patriotic Party succeeded in passing the Constitution of 3 May, the hetmans and their supporters created the Targowica Confederation in defense of the traditional Golden Liberties and the cardinal laws, and called for the Russian Empire for assistance. After the War in Defense of the Constitution, which was won by the Confederates and their Russian allies, the Hetman Party was briefly victorious, but events escalated beyond their imagining, with the Second Partition of Poland followed by the Kościuszko Uprising and the final Third Partition of Poland, ending the independent existence of the Commonwealth.

== Main members ==
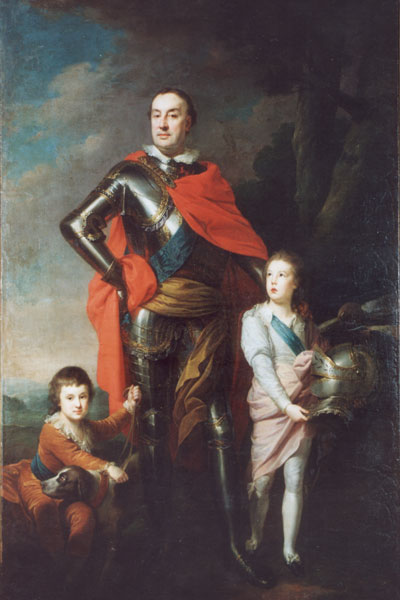
Hetman Franciszek Ksawery Branicki

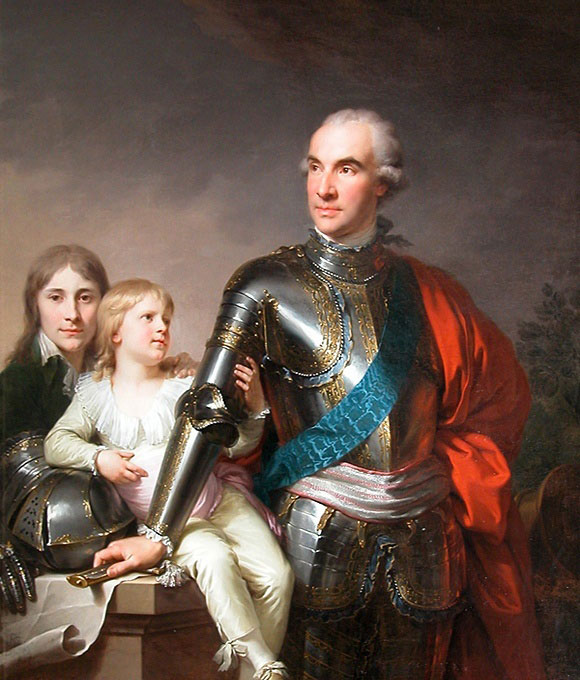
Stanisław Szczęsny Potocki

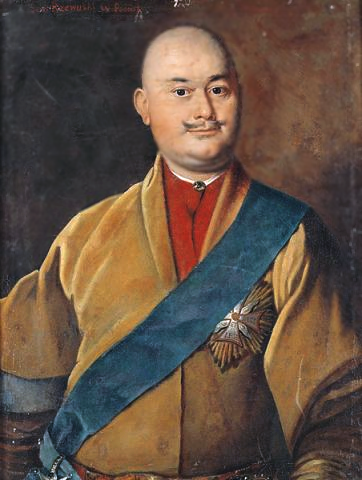
Hetman Seweryn Rzewuski

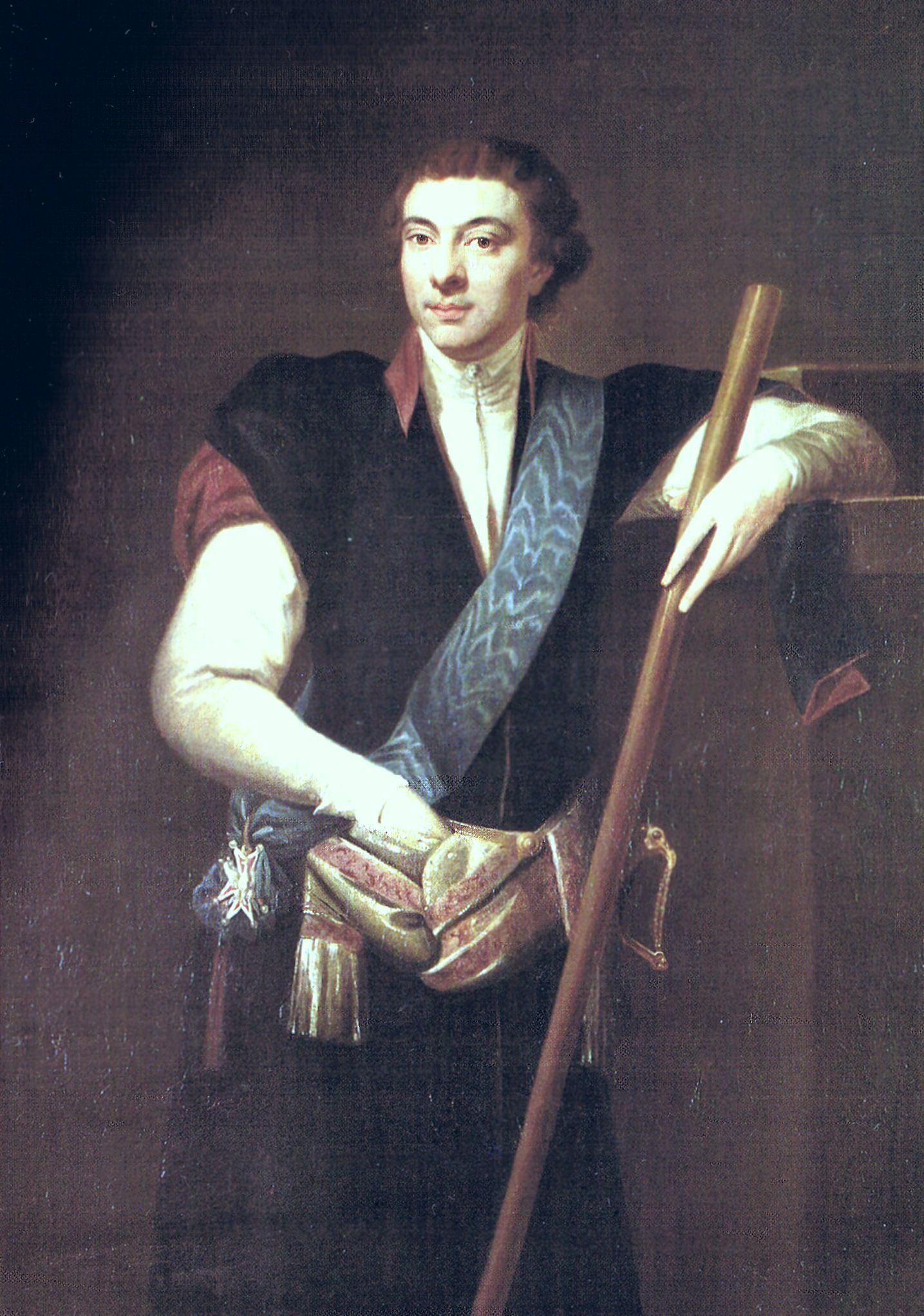
Kazimierz Nestor Sapieha
