= Stanisław Ferdynand Rzewuski =

Polish noble and Austrian general (1737–1786)

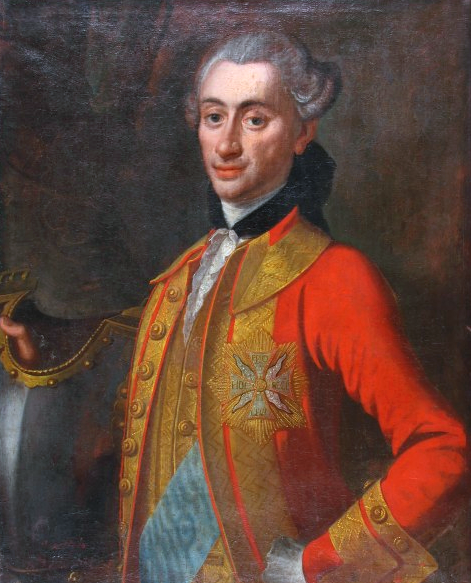
- Coat of arms: Krzywda
- Born: 1737; Podhorce
- Died: 16 June 1786 (aged 48–49); Pohrebyszcze
- Noble family: Rzewuski
- Spouse: Katarzyna Karolina Radziwiłł
- Issue: 6, including Adam Wawrzyniec Rzewuski
- Father: Wacław Rzewuski
- Mother: Anna Lubomirska

Stanisław Ferdynand Rzewuski (1737 – 16 June 1786) was a Polish nobleman (szlachcic) of the Rzewuski family, bearing the Krzywda coat of arms. He held several state offices in the Polish–Lithuanian Commonwealth and attained the rank of Generalmajor in the Austrian imperial army.

== Life ==
Rzewuski was born in Podhorce in 1737, the son of Grand Crown Hetman Wacław Rzewuski and Anna Lubomirska. On 13 June 1758 he married Katarzyna Karolina Radziwiłł (1740–1798), daughter of Michał Kazimierz "Rybeńko" Radziwiłł, in Nieśwież. The Radziwiłł family was one of the wealthiest and most influential magnate families in the Grand Duchy of Lithuania. They had six children: Seweryn, Adam Wawrzyniec, Teofilia, Anna, Franciszka, and Karolina. Through his son Adam Wawrzyniec, Rzewuski was the grandfather of Ewelina Hańska, who married the French novelist Honoré de Balzac, and Karolina Sobańska.

He died on 16 June 1786 in Pohrebyszcze.

== Career ==
=== Commonwealth offices ===
Rzewuski was appointed Rotmistrz of a pancerny unit in 1755 and promoted to major-general of Crown forces in 1757. He received the Order of the White Eagle in 1760.

He served as Great Podstoli of Lithuania from 24 September 1759. On 30 May 1760 he was appointed Great Chorąży of Lithuania, the officer responsible for bearing the state banner at official ceremonies, and held the position until 1781. He was also starost of Chełm from 1758 to 1769.

=== Austrian service ===
Following the First Partition of Poland in 1772, which placed parts of the Commonwealth under Habsburg control, a number of Polish nobles accepted commissions in the Austrian army. On 25 October 1783, Rzewuski was promoted to Generalmajor (major-general) in the Austrian imperial army.
