= Gawęda szlachecka =

Polish literary form

Gawęda szlachecka (variously translated as szlachta storytelling, noble storytelling, noble tale, etc.) is a Polish literary form in which works are presented as a story told by a Polish nobleman stylized as a Polish oral tradition of storytelling known as gawęda, i.e., a tale of no particular plot, a series of loosely connected episodes narrated in colloquial language with many embellishments. It is associated with the tradition of Sarmatism. The Dictionary of Polish Language by PWN defines gawęda szlachecka as "a story in verse or prose demonstrating an image of Sarmatian traditions". Developed in the first half of the 19th century, Henryk Rzewuski being the most influential figure in this respect, with his Pamiątki Soplicy (The Memoirs of Soplica). Due to the association with Sarmatism the style was also known as "pogadanka kontuszowa" ("kontusz tale"), with kontusz being a distinctive Sarmatian-style garment of Polish nobility.

== Influence of the Memoirs of Soplica ==
Czesław Miłosz wrote about Rzewuski and The Memoirs of Soplica as follows:

A picturesque personality, he worshiped Old Poland in its most Sarmatian, obscurantist aspects and showed nothing but contempt for all the trends stemming from the Enlightenment <...> His first book, The Memoirs of Mr. Seweryn Soplica, was published in 1839 in Paris, and though it was called a novel, it is in fact a gawęda. Episodic anecdotes taken from the life of the 18th-century are related in humorous essays connected by the personality and colorful speech of the narrator. <...> The work hypnotized its readers with the vividness of its style and was admired by Mickiewicz.

The Memoirs of Soplica spawned a large number of followers and thus popularized the genre of gawęda szlachecka. In particular, it impressed Adam Mickiewicz so that he created his own szlachta story, Pan Tadeusz, in which the main character belongs to the fictional Soplica family, the name borrowed from Rzewuski .

== Gawęda ==
A 19th century Polish writer Kazimierz Władysław Wóycicki gave the following description of gawęda:

In it there was something to learn, something to listen to, whether in a szlachcic's manor or in a lord's castle. One of them described his life as a knight, another one how he visited his lord's court, what he saw, where he stayed, what countries and wonders he saw, if he traveled abroad with his lord. The hunter [told how he] taught how to train falcons, how to hide their roosters and nests during the winter, how to train dogs to break bears and how to hunt boars in the forest; Finally, more important conversations about the good of Rzeczpospolita were brought to the table, and in this way, via a gawęda, a young man developed as a man. Such gawęda was a school and an academy, especially given the friendly life of our landowners. Oh! it was also a terrible weapon against bad morals, a bad person was afraid of it, so that his name would not sound infamous in the gossip of his neighbors, because then he would be lost forever, but a good one would gain fame. In a gawęda you had the exact history of every family and events, even in the nation, and if someone had written down what had been talked [in gawędas] about since their youth, you would have read things that were more important and interesting than when you leaf through the dry chronicles.

== Works in gawęda szlachecka style ==
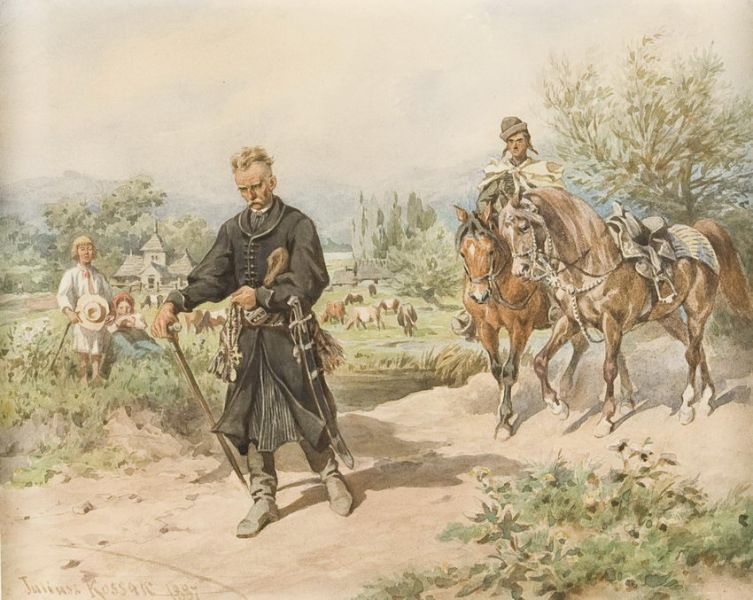
Pilgrimage of the Last of Nechujas

- Jan Chryzostom Pasek, Pamiętniki ("Memoirs"), written in late 1600s or early 1700s, found in 18th century and fist published in full in 1836
- Henryk Rzewuski, Pamiątki Soplicy (The Memoirs of Soplica) (a cycle of stories, 1839-1845)
- Adam Mickiewicz, Pan Tadeusz (1834), has elements of gawęda
- Zygmunt Kaczkowski, Olbrachtowi rycerze ("Olbracht's Knights") trilogy (1889), The Last of Nieczujas, a cycle of historical novels, 1851-1858
- Witold Gombrowicz, Trans-Atlantyk, (1953), a satirical novel, stylized as gawęda szlachecka
- Stanisław Vincenz is said to write "extensive essays combining the tradition of old szlachta gawęda ("tradycję staroszlacheckiej gawędy") with humanistic erudition."
- Adam Gorczyński, among the most popular stories were Zamek Libusza; Niedźwiedzica; Górnice; Hełm Jaksy; Wróżba Maruchy; Kasperek; Straszny strzelec. Some of these stories were translated into Czech and German.

== See also ==
- Silva rerum
