= Ludwika Maria Rzewuska =

Polish noblewoman (1744–1816)

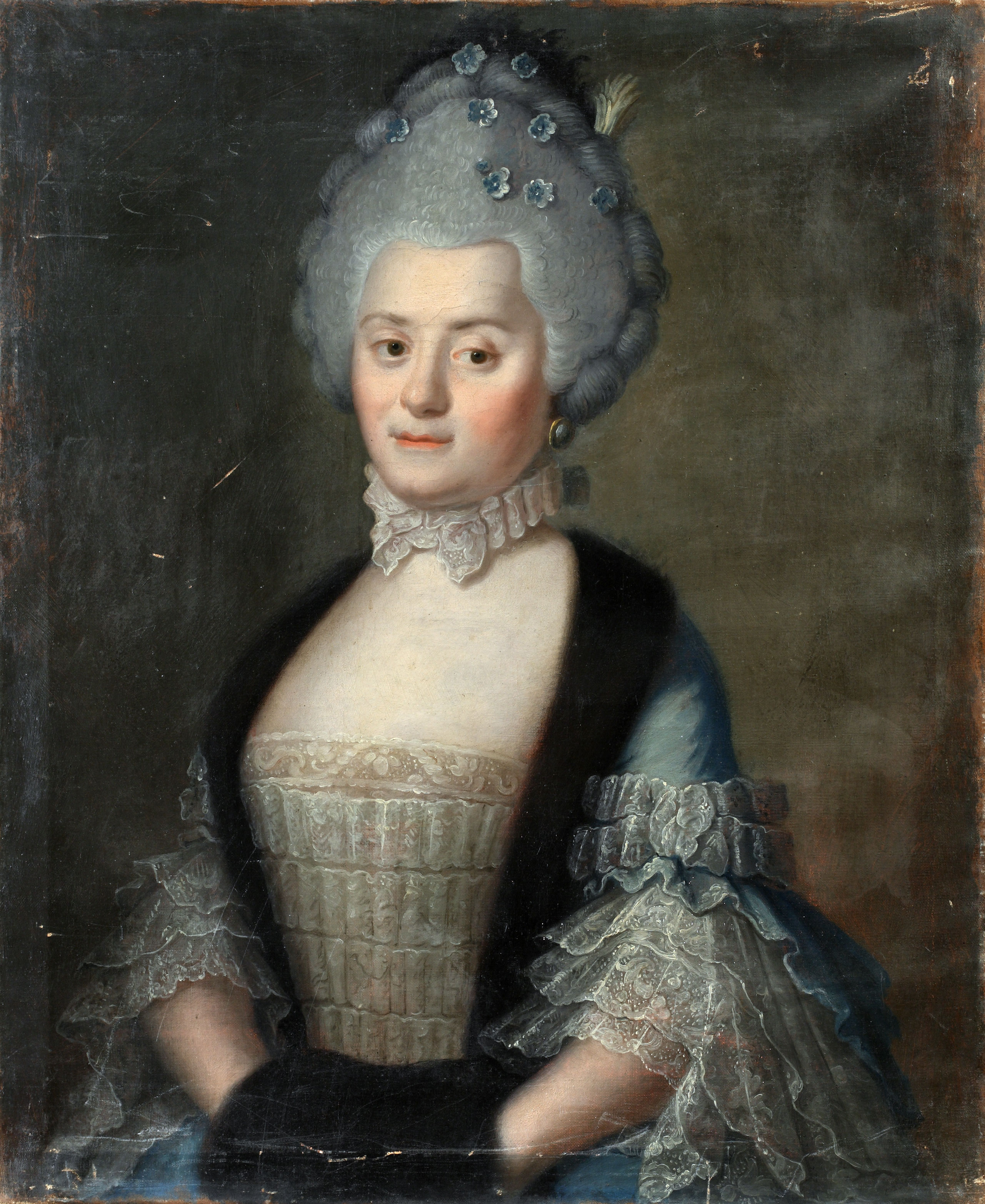
- Coat of arms: Krzywda
- Born: 1744
- Died: February 6, 1816; Chernobyl
- Family: Rzewuski
- Consort: Jan Mikołaj Chodkiewicz
- Issue: Wacław Chodkiewicz; Rozalia Chodkiewicz; Aleksander Franciszek Chodkiewicz; Józef Chodkiewicz; Elżbieta Chodkiewicz; Anna Chodkiewicz
- Father: Wacław Rzewuski
- Mother: Anna Lubomirska

Ludwika Maria Róża Rzewuska (1744–1816) was a Polish noblewoman (szlachcianka) and writer.

She was the youngest daughter of Wacław Rzewuski and Anna Lubomirska. On 1 January 1766, she married Jan Mikołaj Chodkiewicz in Podhorce (Pidhirtsi).

She wrote instructions concerning the care, education and safety of her children, which are important sources. These instructions were discussed in academic literature.

In 1806, she bought Jampol from Dominik Zasławski.
