= Henryk Rzewuski =

Polish journalist and novelist (1791–1866)

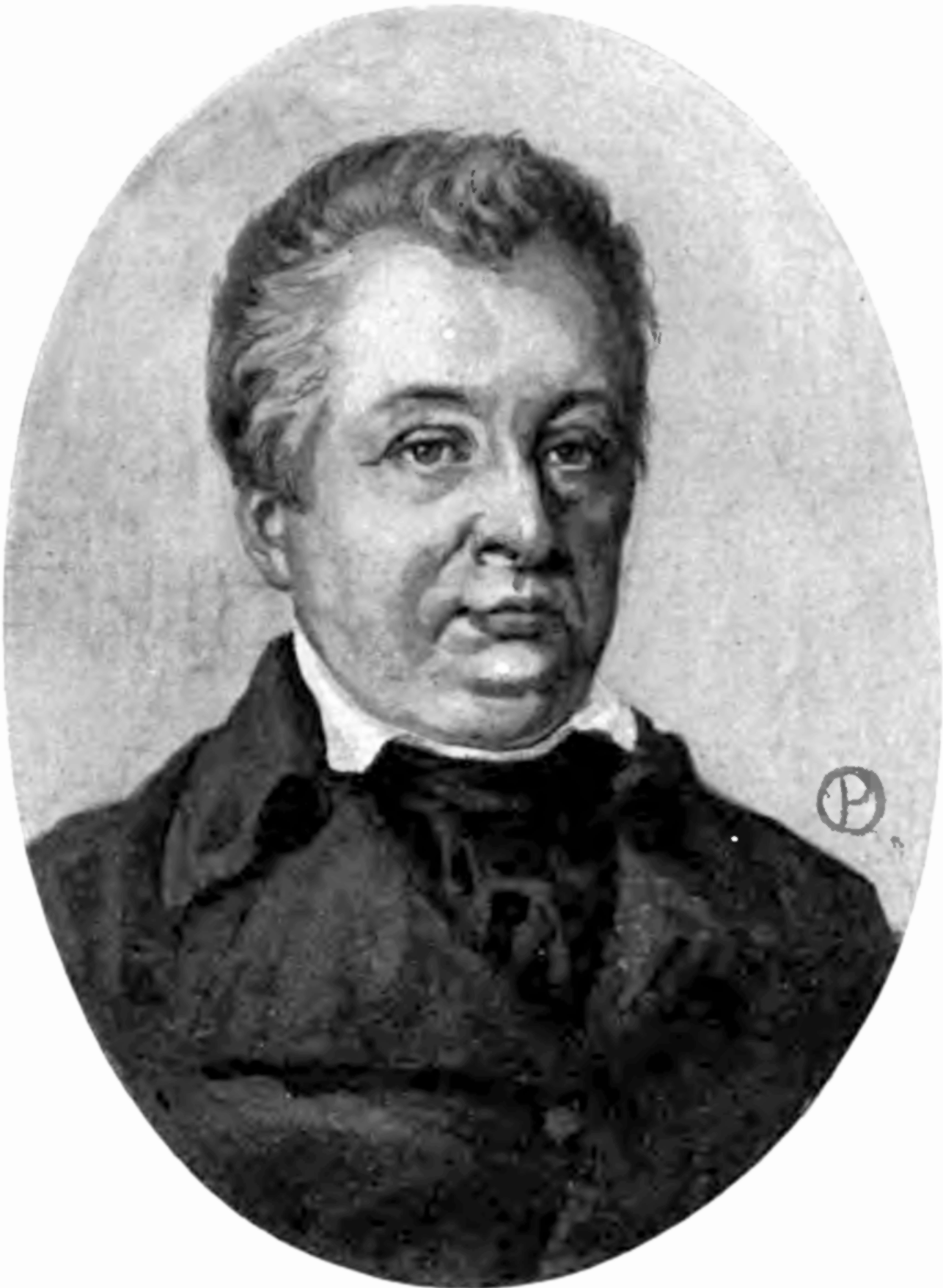
- Coat of arms: Krzywda
- Born: 3 May 1791; Slavuta
- Died: 28 February 1866 (aged 74); Chudniv
- Noble family: Rzewuski
- Consort: Julia Justyna Grocholska h. Syrokomla
- Father: Adam Wawrzyniec Rzewuski
- Mother: Justyna Rdułtowska h. Drogosław

Henryk Rzewuski (3 May 1791 – 28 February 1866) was a Polish nobleman, Romantic-era journalist and novelist.

== Life ==
Count Henryk Rzewuski was a scion of a Polish magnate family in Ukraine. He was the son of Adam Wawrzyniec Rzewuski, a Russian senator who resided in St. Petersburg; a great-nephew of a Targowica confederate; and great-grandson of Wacław Rzewuski, Polish Great Crown Hetman who had been exiled in 1767–73 to Kaluga by the Russian ambassador to the Polish–Lithuanian Commonwealth, Nikolai Repnin, who was effectively running the Commonwealth.

Henryk Rzewuski was, further, the brother of Karolina Sobańska (who became an agent of the Russian secret service and mistress of the Polish poet Adam Mickiewicz), Ewelina Hańska (who married Honoré de Balzac), and Russian General Adam Rzewuski.

In his youth, Rzewuski served in the army of the Duchy of Warsaw, participating in the Duchy's brief 1809 war with Austria. In 1845–50, in St. Petersburg, Russia, with Michał Grabowski he headed a conservative, Russian-aligned "St. Petersburg coterie" and contributed to the Polish Tygodnik Petersburski (The St. Petersburg Weekly).

In 1850–56 Rzewuski, an advocate of the closest Polish-Russian political collaboration, worked with Russian Imperial Viceroy Ivan Paskevich, and in 1851–56 he edited Dziennik Warszawki (The Warsaw Daily).

Rzewuski had traveled much—in 1825, to Crimea, together with Mickiewicz. He had later met the poet in Rome and had enthralled him with stories of the old Polish nobility, helping inspire Mickiewicz's great verse epic, Pan Tadeusz. Rzewuski's tales would later similarly influence Henryk Sienkiewicz's historical novels set in Poland (The Trilogy). The same influence he had in historical novels wrote by Teodor Jeske-Choiński. The Russian Empire's suppression of the Polish November 1830 Uprising and the ensuing repression, by the three partitioning powers, of Polish culture, education and politics had forced Polish writers to seek a collective identity in their country's past. This had created a new vogue for the Polish gawęda szlachecka, which had antecedents in Poland's 17th-century memoirists. The gawęda is a discursive fiction in which the narrator recounts incidents in a highly stylized personal language. It was this genre of which Henryk Rzewuski was the past master.

Czesław Miłosz characterizes Rzewuski as a literary figure:

A picturesque personality, he worshiped Old Poland in its most Sarmatian, obscurantist aspects and showed... contempt for all Enlightenment trends... His first book, The Memoirs of Soplica, was published in 1839 in Paris, and though it was called a novel, it is in fact a gawęda. [A]necdotes... from [18th-century] life... are related in humorous essays [that are] connected by the [narrator's] personality and colorful speech... The work [mesmerized] its readers [by its] vivid... style and was admired by Mickiewicz, who knew it in manuscript form long before its publication.

Another of Rzewuski's works of fiction, November (1845–46), deals again with the eighteenth century and gives a panorama of social and political life. The author's... sympathy for the old-fashioned Sarmatians and his antipathy to French... ideas are somewhat mitigated by his effort to preserve an artistic balance... November is perhaps more of a historical novel than a gawęda, though [its loquacious] style with all its baroque humor and prodigality of colloquialisms links it to the author's preceding work.

The vein of Sarmatian gentry buffoonery that runs throughout all Rzewuski's writings was also typical of other [Polish] writers who, like him, cannot be said to have contributed anything to the formation of a disciplined, economical language in fiction.

== Works ==
- Pamiątki Soplicy (The Memoirs of Soplica; full title: Pamiątki JPana Seweryna Soplicy, cześnika parnawskiego; 1839, 4 volumes; critical edition by Zygmunt Szweykowski, 1928); revised for the censors as Pamiętniki starego szlachcica litewskiego (Memoirs of an Old Lithuanian Nobleman; 1844–45)
- Mieszaniny obyczajowe (Assorted Customs; 1841–43), published under the pen name "Jarosz Bejła"
- Listopad (November; 1845–46), 3-volume novel; critical edition by K. Wojciechowski, 1923; translated into Czech, Russian, German, English; a superb picture of Polish society, artfully styled and constructed, with masterfully crafted characters.
- Zamek krakowski (The Kraków Castle; 1847–48)
- Teofrast polski (A Polish Theophrastus; 1851)
- Adam Śmigielski (1851)
- Rycerz Lizdejko (The Knight Lizdejko; 1852)
- Zaporożec (The Zaporozhian; 1854)
- Pamiętniki Bartłomieja Michałowskiego (The Memoirs of Bartłomiej Michałowski; 1855–57)
- Próbki historyczne (Historic Samples; 1868)
- Uwagi o dawnej Polsce przez starego Szlachcica Seweryna Soplicę Cześnika Parnawskiego napisane 1832 r. (Remarks about Old Poland Written in 1832 by the Old Nobleman Seweryn Soplica...; manuscript, published in 2003)

== See also ==
- Polish Romanticism
