= Gawęda (surname) =

Gawęda is a Polish-language surname, a variant is Gawenda. The primary meaning of the word is a social chat or tale, and the surname originated from the nickname for a person who likes to talk much, to chat, or who tells tales.

Notable people with this surname include:

- Adam Gawęda (born 1967), Polish mining engineer, politician and statesman
- Czesław Gawęda (1896–1979), Polish highly decorated soldier
- Dominika Gawęda, lead singer of Polish band Blue Café
- Stanisław Gawęda (1914–1994), polish historian, educator and highly decorated soldier
