= Wacław Rzewuski =

Polish dramatist (1706–1779)

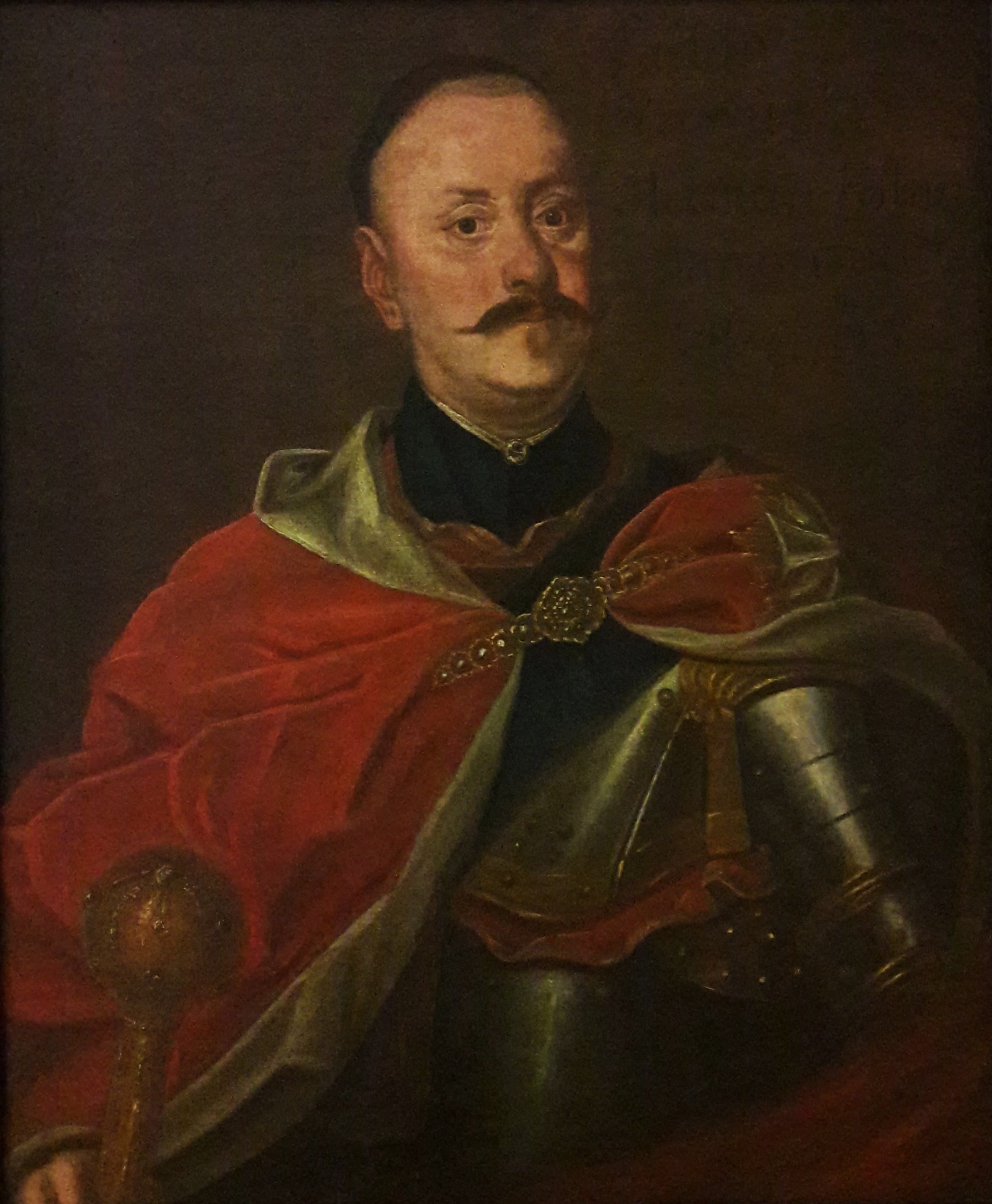
- Portrait of Wacław Piotr Rzewuski as Field Hetman of the Crown, ca. 1752, National Museum of Lublin.
- Coat of arms: Krzywda
- Born: 1706; Rozdół, Polish–Lithuanian Commonwealth
- Died: 1779 (aged 72–73); Sielec, Polish–Lithuanian Commonwealth
- Noble family: Rzewuski
- Spouse: Anna Lubomirska
- Issue: Stanisław Ferdynand Rzewuski; Józef Rzewuski; Seweryn Rzewuski; Maria Ludwika Rzewuska; Teresa Karolina Anna Rzewuska
- Father: Stanisław Mateusz Rzewuski
- Mother: Ludwika Kunicka h. Bończa

Wacław Piotr Rzewuski (1706–1779) was a Polish dramatist and poet as well as a military commander and a Grand Crown Hetman. As a notable nobleman and magnate, Rzewuski held a number of important posts in the administration of the Polish–Lithuanian Commonwealth.

== Biography ==
He was a Field Clerk of the Crown since 1732, voivode of Podole Voivodship between 1736 and 1762 (with a gap between 1750 and 1756). In 1735 he received the prestigious Order of the White Eagle. A brave soldier, since 1752 he held the rank of Field Hetman of the Crown. A Castellan of several notable towns, he was an important politician at the Royal Court in Warsaw and was one of the main supporters of the liberum veto during the Diet of 1764, when he became known for his dispute with Szymon Konarski. During the Diet of 1767 (Repnin Sejm) he opposed Prince Nikolai Repnin's - Russia's ambassador to the Commonwealth - interfering in Poland's domestic affairs. In response, he was kidnapped along with his son Seweryn and two other prominent Polish politicians by Russian agents and imprisoned in Kaluga. Upon his release in April 1773 he was promoted for his merits to the rank of Grand Crown Hetman, but resigned the post in November of that year.

Since 1778 he was the Castellan of Kraków and the Voivode of Kraków Voivodship. At the end of his life he was also the Starost of Chełm, Ułany, Romanów, Dolina, Drohobycz and Kruszwica.

As a writer, Rzewuski authored a number of classicist comedies (including the 1759 play Natręt) and several historical tragedies, including a biography of Stanisław Żółkiewski (1758). He also published a number of poems and a poetic handbook On the Science of Poetry (1762). All of his works were published in 1962.

He was the great-grandfather of Ewelina Hańska, wife of French author Honoré de Balzac.

Rzewuski owned Pidhirtsi Castle and also the nearby Olesko Castle.

== Wife ==
Princess Anna Lubomirska (1717 — 1763) was a Polish noblewoman (Polish language: szlachcianka), Grand Hetmaness of the Crown (hetmanowa wielka koronna), and diarist, who was known for her piety.

She married Rzewuski in 1732.

On September 14, 1748, while she stayed in Vienna, she was received the Order of the Starry Cross, which was the highest Austrian state badge for women at the time.

=== Publications ===
- Nabożeństwo codzienne świętey pamięci Jeymości pani Anny z Xiążąt Lubomirskich Rzewuskiey Woiewodziny Krakowskiej, Hetmanowey polskiey Koronney, wyięte z książek Jey ręką pisanych (Warszawa, 1792), second edition: Nabożeństwo codzienne wyjęte z książek jej ręką pisanych (Łuck, year unknown)

== Children ==
Wacław Rzewuski had ten children. Five of them survived childhood:

- Stanisław Ferdynand Rzewuski (1737–1786), Great Chorąży of Lithuania
- Józef Rzewuski (1739–1816), general and member of the Sejm
- Seweryn Rzewuski (1743–1811), Field Hetman of the Crown
- Teresa Karolina Anna Rzewuska (1742–1787), married Karol Stanisław Radziwiłł
- Maria Ludwika Rzewuska (1744–1816), married Jan Mikołaj Chodkiewicz
