= Przerowa coat of arms =

Polish coat of arms

Przerowa
- Alternative names: Grotowie, Proporzec, Przyrowa
- Earliest mention: 1100
- Families: Arnaucki, Baryłowicz, Belski, Beski, Białek, Bielski, Burnatowicz, Cetner, Drogoń, Drogoński, Drwalewski, Drwalski, Gaźlinski, Głoskowski, Goliański, Gośliński, Goźliński, Grodkowski, Grotowski, Gruntowski, Jarochowski, Krobowski, Mianowski, Palczowski, Pielski, Podleśny, Podliszewski, Przerowski, Rosochowski, Rossochowski, Sępochowski, Skurowski, Słonawski, Uleniecki, Uliniecki, Zawisza, Zawisza-Czarny

Przerowa is a Polish coat of arms. It was used by several szlachta families in the times of the Polish–Lithuanian Commonwealth.

== History ==
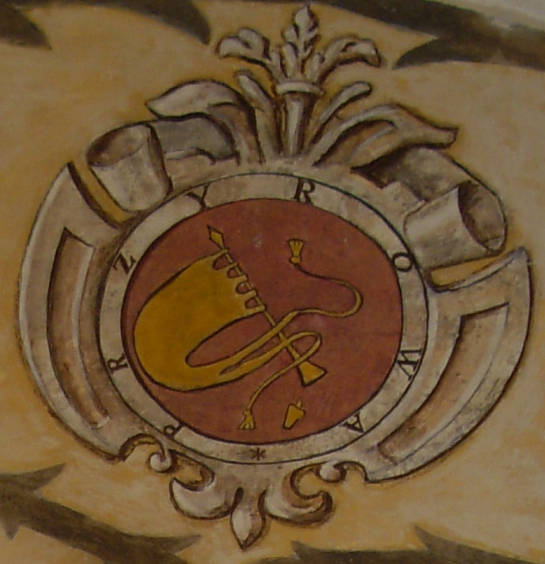
Przerowa (Przyrowa) coat of arms in Baranów Sandomierski castle

== Notable bearers ==
Notable bearers of this coat of arms include:

== See also ==
- Polish heraldry
- Heraldry
- Coat of arms
- List of Polish nobility coats of arms

== Sources ==
- Dynastic Genealogy
- Ornatowski.com
