= Rzewuski family =

Polish noble family

Coat of arms of the Rzewuski family

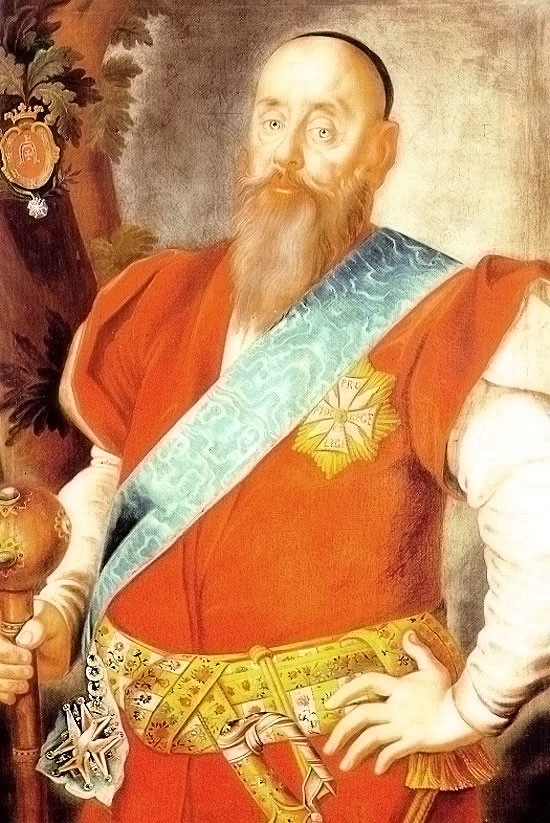
Wacław Rzewuski

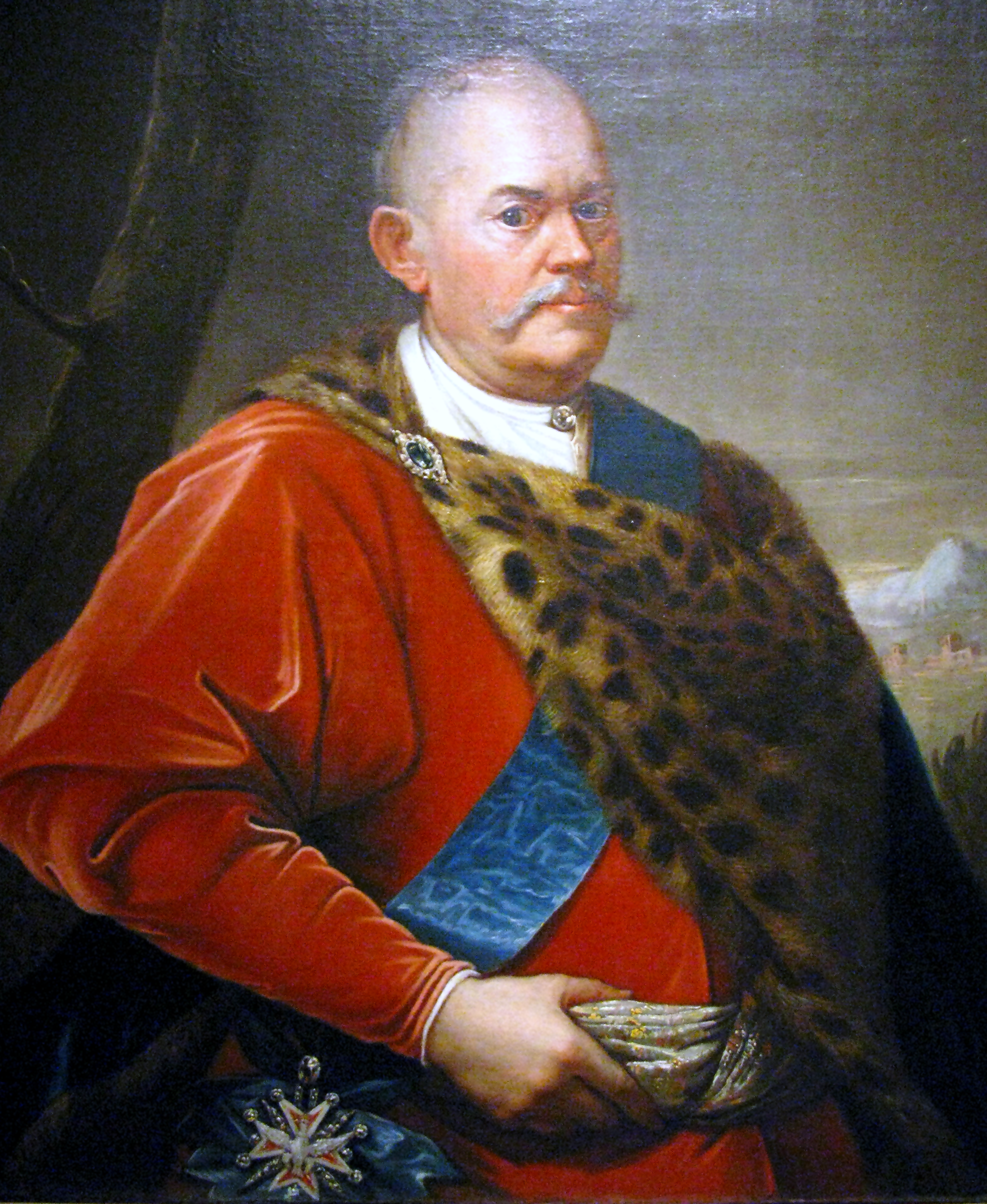
Michał Józef Rzewuski

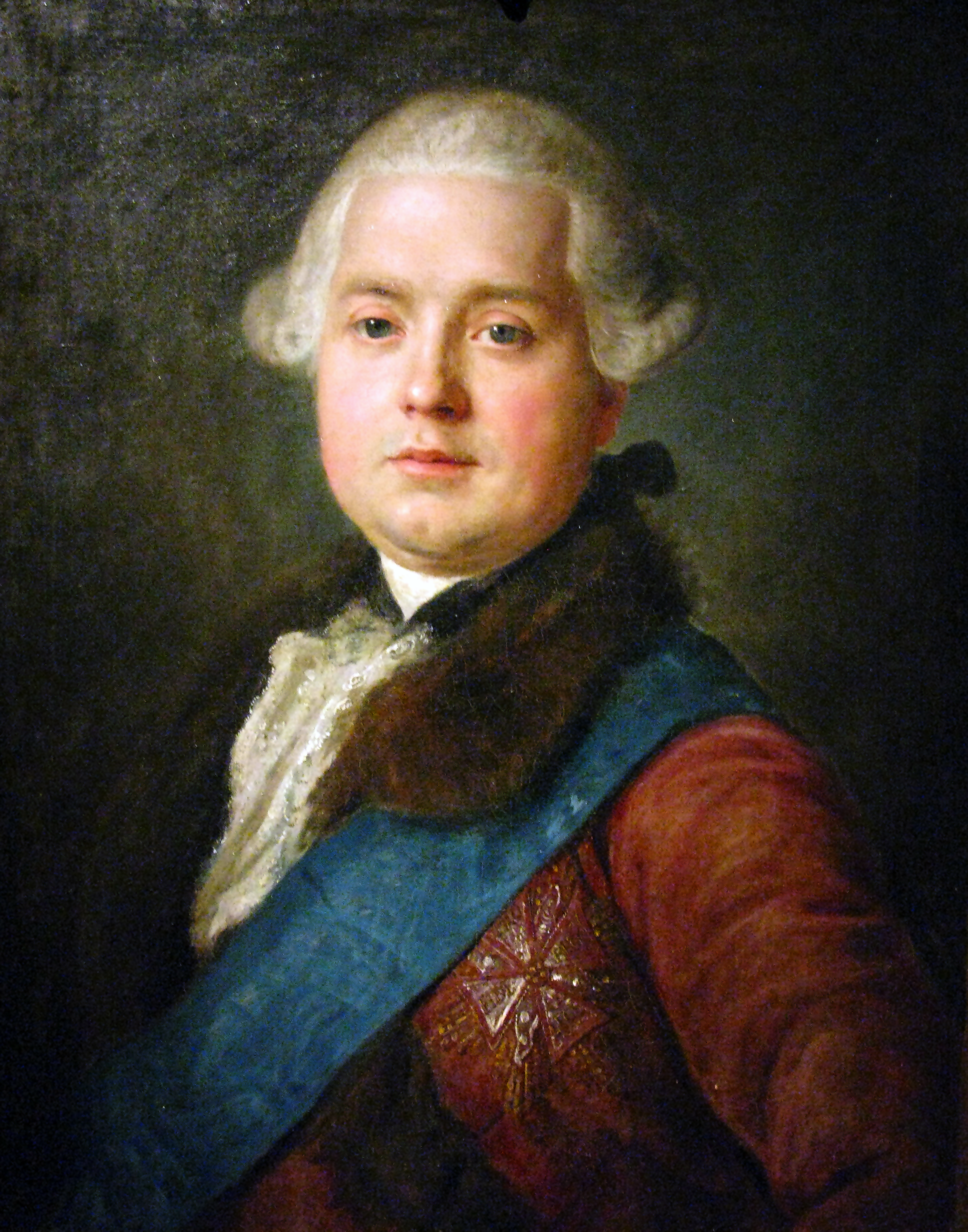
Franciszek Michał Rzewuski

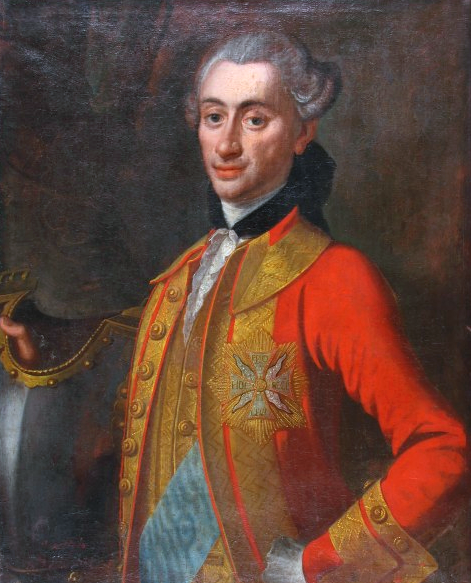
Stanisław Ferdynand Rzewuski

The House of Rzewuski (Polish: Rzewuski, Rzewuscy) was an important Polish noble family (magnates) in the 17th century during the era of the Polish–Lithuanian Commonwealth.

== History ==
The family originated from the village Bejdy near the town of Łosice in the Podlasie region. They used the Krzywda coat of arms. Members of the family received the title of Count and held several notable positions in the Polish–Lithuanian Commonwealth, most notably, that of a hetman (thrice).

== Coat of arms ==
The Rzewuski family used the Krzywda Coat of Arms and their motto was "Qua via Virtutis".

== Notable representatives ==
- Michał Florian Rzewuski (c.1630–1687) deputy voivode of Lwów, royal court podskarbi, starosta of Chełmno
- Seweryn Rzewuski (1743–1811), Field Crown Hetman
- Adam Rzewuski (d. 1717), castellan of Podlasie
- Ewelina Hańska (1805–1882), wife of Honoré de Balzac
- Maria Ludwika Rzewuska (1744–1816), wife of Jan Mikołaj Chodkiewicz
- Henryk Rzewuski (1791–1866), writer and essayist
- Teresa Karolina Rzewuska (1749–1787). wife of Karol Stanisław "Panie Kochanku" Radziwiłł
- Stanisław Ferdynand Rzewuski (1737–1786), starosta chełmski, Sejm deputy
- Stanisław Mateusz Rzewuski (1662–1728), Grand Crown Hetman
- Walery Rzewuski (1837–1888), early portrait photographer, alderman of Kraków
- Wacław Piotr Rzewuski (1706–1779), Grand Crown Hetman
- Wacław Seweryn Rzewuski (1784–1831), traveler
- Alexander Rzewuski (1893-1983), illustrator, Dominican friar and memoirist

== Palaces ==
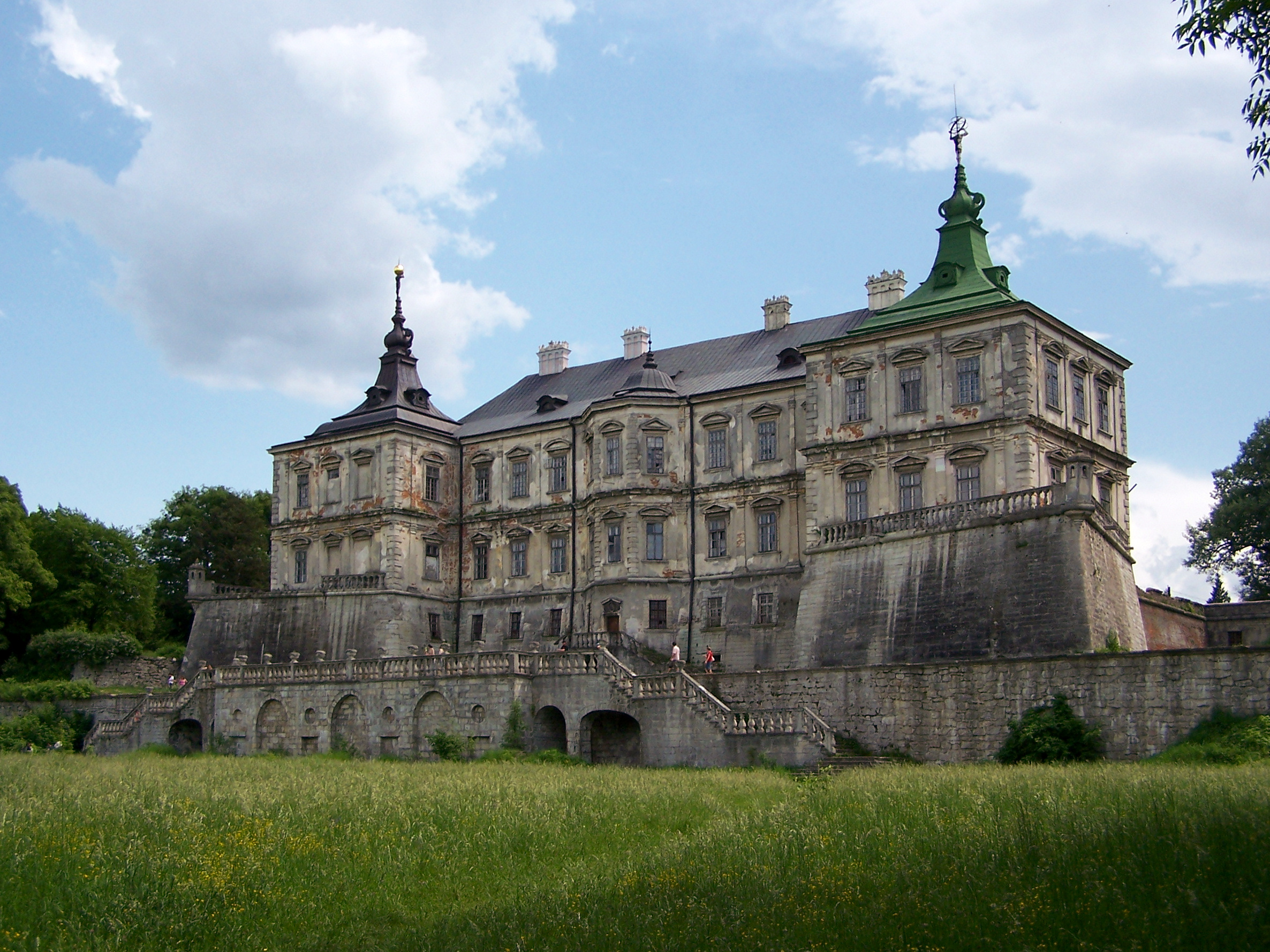
Palace in Podhorce

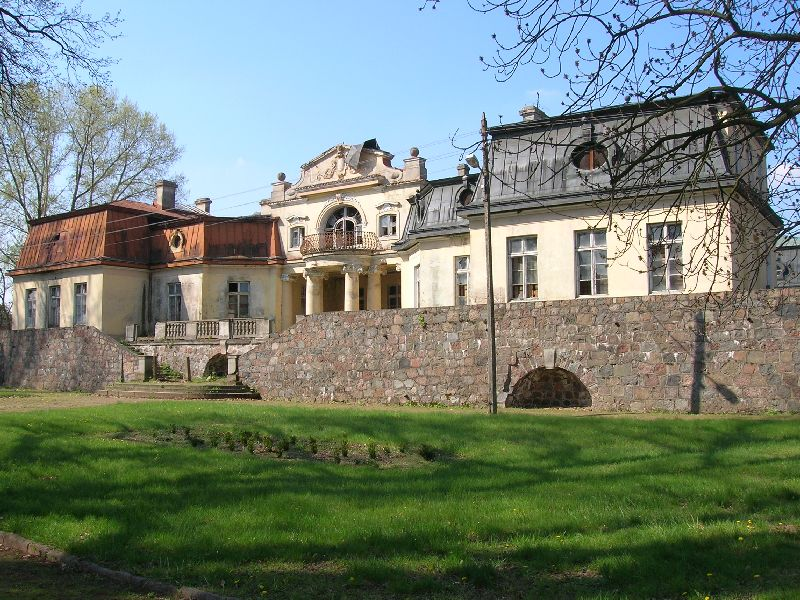
Manor house in Bratoszewice

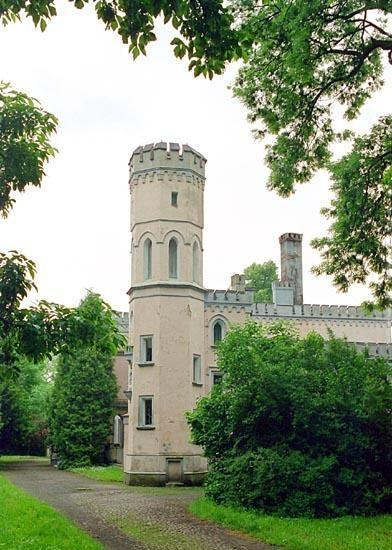
Palace in Arcugowo

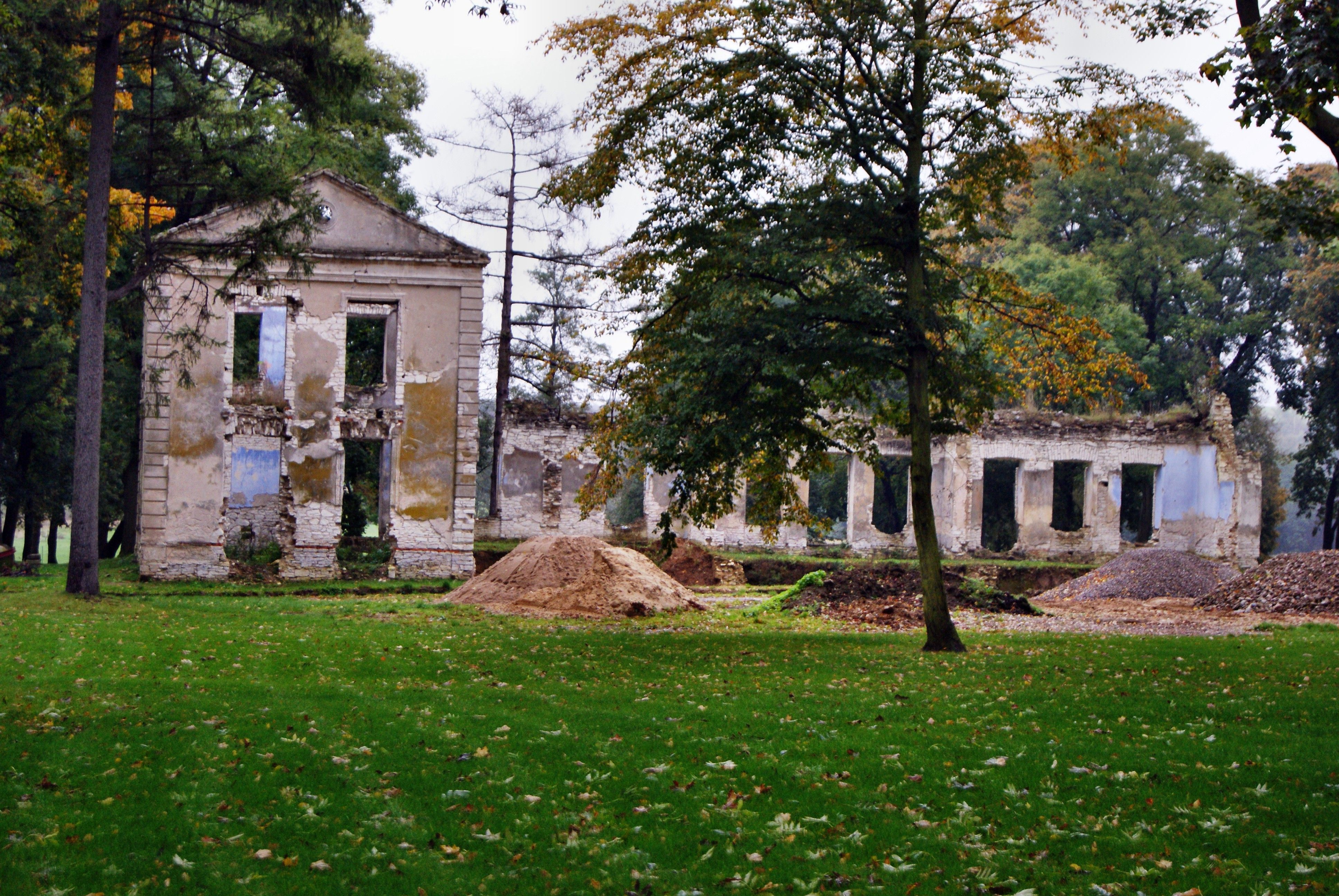
Ruins of a Rzewuski manor house in Gardzienice

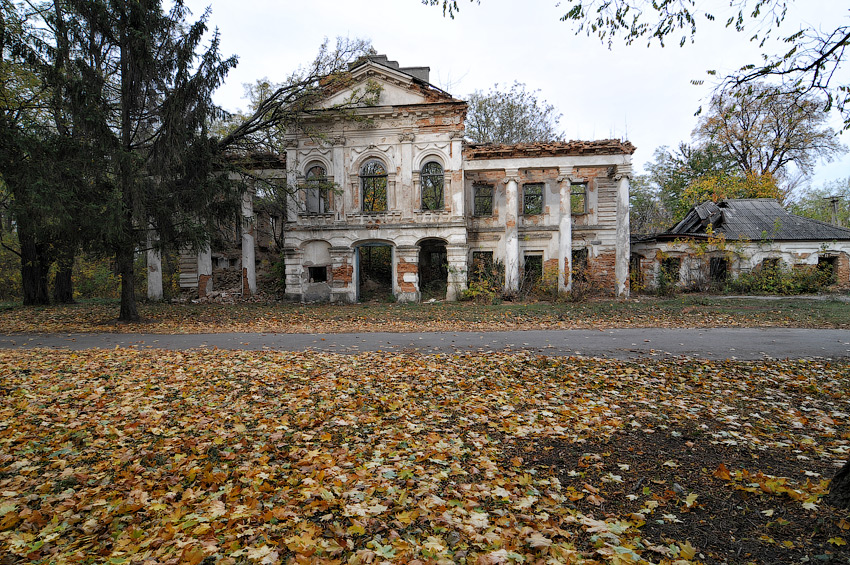
Ruins of the Branicki palace in Rudym Siele

== Sources ==
- "Ржевусские" . Brockhaus and Efron Encyclopedic Dictionary (in Russian). 1906.
- Dworzaczek Włodzimierz, Genealogia, Warszawa 1959
- Lenczewski Tomasz, Genealogie rodów utytułowanych w Polsce, t. I, Warszawa 1995-1996
