= Stanisław Mateusz Rzewuski =

Polish nobleman (1662–1728)

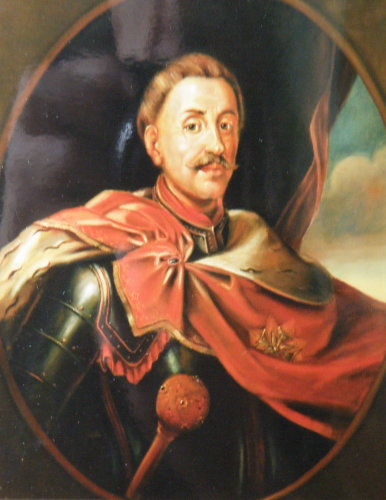
- Coat of arms: Krzywda
- Born: 1662
- Died: 4 November 1728 (aged 65–66); Lwów
- Noble family: Rzewuski
- Spouses: Dorota Cetner h. Przerowa; Ludwika Kunicka h. Bończa
- Issue: 5, including Wacław Rzewuski
- Father: Michał Florian Rzewuski
- Mother: Anna Dzierżek h. Nieczuja

Stanisław Mateusz Rzewuski (1662–1728) was a Polish nobleman (szlachcic).

He was a Royal Colonel since 1690, General of foreign mercenaries contingent and Krajczy of the Crown since 1702, Great Recorder of the Crown since 1703, Field Crown Hetman since 1706, voivode of Podlasie Voivodeship since 1710, Great Crown Hetman and voivode of Bełz Voivodeship since 1726, starost chełmski, drohowyski, kłodawski, nowosielski, lubomski.

He was married to Dorota Cetner and they had one child, Seweryn Józef Rzewuski. He was later married to Ludwika Kunicka and they had four more children: Wacław Rzewuski, Marianna Rzewuska, Sabina Rzewuska and Anna Rzewuska.
