= Seweryn Rzewuski =

Polish nobleman and writer (1743–1811)

Hetman Seweryn Rzewuski
- Field Hetman of the Crown
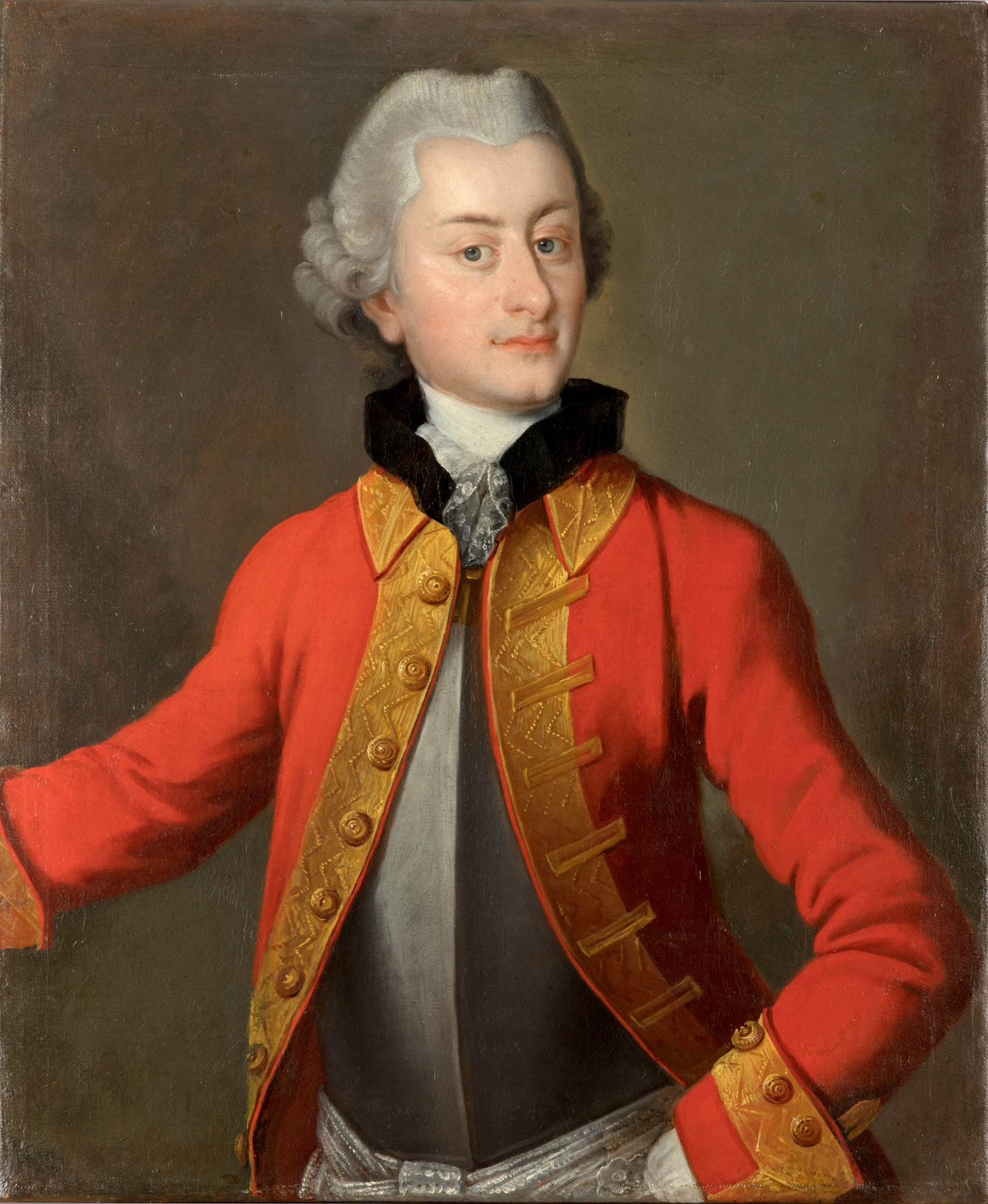
- Coat of arms: Krzywda
- Born: 13 March 1743; Podhorce, Polish–Lithuanian Commonwealth
- Died: 11 December 1811 (aged 68); Vienna, Austrian Empire
- Noble family: Rzewuski family
- Spouse: Konstancja Małgorzata Lubomirska
- Issue: Waclaw Rzewuski; Izabella Rzewuska; Maria Rzewuska
- Father: Wacław Rzewuski
- Mother: Anna Lubomirska

Seweryn Rzewuski (Polish pronunciation: [sɛˈvɛrɨn ʐɛˈvuskʲi]; 13 March 1743 in Podhorce – 11 December 1811 in Vienna) was a Polish nobleman, writer, poet, general of the Royal Army, Field Hetman of the Crown, Voivode of Podolian Voivodeship and one of the leaders of the Targowica Confederation.

== Biography ==
=== Early life and studies ===
His father was Hetman Wacław Rzewuski, while his mother was Anna Lubomirska. He had nine siblings.

He firstly studied in Warsaw. Starting from 1754, Rzewuski's educator was L. A. Caraccioli, and under his care, all of the children in the family were educated abroad (Rzewuski visited, most notably, Austria, Italy and France).

=== Political and military career ===
As voivode, he signed the election of Stanisław II Augustus in 1764, and was later an envoy to the Repnin Sejm. Because of his opposition to the Russian ambassador there, he and his father, Wacław Rzewuski were kidnapped on the night of 13/14 October 1767 by Russian forces under the command of General Iosif Igelström and imprisoned in Kaluga. He returned to Poland in 1773. On 4 September 1775, both received in restitution from the king the Orders of St. Stanislaus and the White Eagle, but this was not enough to reconcile Seweryn, who blamed Poniatowski for his ordeal.

He was an envoy at the Four-Year Sejm, at which he was one of the leaders of the Hetmans' Party, opposing all reforms. He was especially against any changes to the power of the hetmen, having been one since 1774. He was later stripped of this rank by the Sejm for not answering the letters of the Military Commission. In 1791 he went to Russia, where he helped Catherine II with her pretense of only interfering with the affairs of the Polish–Lithuanian Commonwealth after being pleaded with to help by their citizens. He was one of the founding leaders of the Targowica Confederation, having previously been involved in the Radom Confederation in 1767.

In 1793, after Russian and Prussian plans for the Second Partition of Poland became known, he moved to the Galicia and Lodomeria, the land taken from the Commonwealth by Austria in the First Partition of Poland and gave up politics. During the Kościuszko Uprising he was sentenced to death and the confiscation of belongings in absentia by the Supreme Criminal Court and executed in effigy on 29 September 1794.

He was married to Konstancja Małgorzata Lubomirska and had three children, Wacław Rzewuski, Izabella Rzewuska and Maria Rzewuska.

== Bibliography ==
- Elektorów poczet, którzy niegdyś głosowali na elektorów Jana Kazimierza roku 1648, Jana III. roku 1674, Augusta II. roku 1697, i Stanisława Augusta roku 1764, najjaśniejszych Królów Polskich, Wielkich Książąt Litewskich, i.t.d. / ułożył i wydał Oswald Zaprzaniec z Siemuszowej Pietruski, Lwów 1845, s. 319.
- Seweryn Rzewuski, Stanisław Szczęsny Potocki Protestacya przeciw Sukcesji Tronu w Polszcze 1790
- Dariusz Rolnik, Szlachta koronna wobec konfederacji targowickiej (maj 1792 - styczeń 1793), Katowice 2000, s. 163.
- Kawalerowie i statuty Orderu Orła Białego 1705-2008, 2008, s.216.
