= Krzywda coat of arms =

Polish coat of arms

Krzywda
- Battle cry: Krzywda
- Alternative name: none
- Earliest mention: 16th century
- Cities: Ratyniec, Kraków
- Gminas: Gmina Siennica
- Families: 111 names Antoszewicz, Antuszewicz, Augustowicz, Bajkowski, Baykowski, Bejdo, Beyd, Białojezierski, Bogucki, Bogumiłł, Bogusławski, Bohumił, Borkowski, Chmara, Chmura, Chrząstkowski, Chrząstowski, Czarnocki, Dajnowski, Dalkiewicz, Danowski, Daynowski, Dembowicz, Dinowski, Dobrowolski, Dorożyński, Duńczewski, Gałązkowski, Garliński, Gawryłkowicz, Gawryłowicz, Gilewicz, Gorliński, Goski, Grochowski, Grodecki, Hawryłkiewicz, Huściło, Kierzkowski, Kieszkowski, Kiszkowski, Kobyliński, Koiszewski, Koiszowski, Kozikowski, Krasnodębski, Kruszyński, Ksieniewicz, Kudrycki, Kudrzycki, Kulczycki, Lazowski, Listopacki, Listopadzki, Łapa, Łappa, Łazeński, Łazewski, Łaziński, Łazowski, Łoziński, Łozowski, Maciorkowski, Milik, Moniuszko, Muczyński, Nahojewski, Nahojowski, Nahujewski, Niewęgłowski, Obniski, Panasiewicz, Pisulski, Pluto, Pogorzelski, Poleski, Polewski, Ragniewicz, Ratyński, Rojek, Rzewuski, Sankowski, Santecki, Santocki, Sańkowski, Sienicki, Siennicki, Siękowski, Soczycki, Soszycki, Soszyński, Stankiewicz, Suchodolski, Szańkowski, Szarkiewicz, Szarkowski, Szczubielski, Ślaski, Święcicki, Tarasewicz, Tarasowicz, Trzciński, Tubielewicz, Tubilewicz, Węglowski, Węgłowski, Wróblewski, Zazuliński, Zgorzelski, Znamięcki, Znaniecki, Żnajedzki.

Krzywda is a Polish coat of arms. It was used by several noble families. The homeland of this coat of arms is probably the village Krzywda in Podlaskie.

== History ==
There are two legends of how this coat of arms appeared:

The first says one of two (or three) brothers of the Lubicz clan did wrong (krzywda) to the other with respect to his portion of their inheritance, and as a result half of one cross was taken from his coat of arms and the new coat of arms was called Krzywda (which translates from Polish as "injustice", "grief"). Polish: "Gdy jeden Lubicz przy majątkowym działe brata skrzywdził, utracił za to jedno ramie górniego krzyża."

The other version says the missing arm was based on a rule that "The first man to touch a certain piece of land, could claim it". Someone named Bogucki was in a boat looking for the land, and there were many other boats around him. When he feared others might get to the land first, he cut off his arm, threw it to the land, and claimed it as his.

== Blazon ==
In Polish blazon sounds like:

W polu błękitnym podkowa srebrna ocelami w dół zwrócona. W środku niej krzyż kawalerski złoty. Na niej umieszczony krzyż kawalerski złoty bez prawego ramienia. W klejnocie nad hełmem w koronie trzy pióra strusie.

In English:

Azure, within a silver horseshoe ensiegned with a cross pattée sans its right arm, a cross patee both crosses Or. Crest: three ostrich plumes Argent.

In other words, on a blue field there is a silver horseshoe (pointed down) with a gold knight's cross inside it, and another knight's cross missing its right arm on top of it.

== Notable bearers ==
Notable bearers of this coat of arms include:

- Stanisław Moniuszko
- Alexandre-Édouard Kierzkowski
- House of Krasnodębski
- Janusz Feliks Ratyński
- Zygmunt Stanisław Ratyński
- Levko Revutsky
- House of Rzewuski
  - Wacław Rzewuski
  - Ewelina Rzewuska
  - Teresa Karolina Rzewuska
  - Maria Ludwika Rzewuska
  - Seweryn Rzewuski
  - Stanisław Mateusz Rzewuski

Some people of this armorial clan received some titles from other counties. For example:

- Jósef Felix Łasowski – the title of Baron of the French Empire (15 August 1809)
- Kazimierz Rzewuski – the title of Count of Austria (21 April 1819)
- Alexander Soszyński – the title of dvoryanin of Russia (1860)
- and various other members of the latter family received countly titles from Austria and Russia.

== Related coat of arms ==
- Lubicz coat of arms

== See also ==
- Polish heraldry
- Heraldic family
- List of Polish nobility coats of arms

== Bibliography ==
- Ród Krasnodębskich Herbu Krzywda. Szkic Heraldyczno-Historyczny Ze Źródeł Archiwalnych. Author: Aleksander Włodarski Kustosz Archiwum Głównego, strona: wstęp do opracowania, Warszawa 1927, Druk Piotra Laskauera
- Tadeusz Gajl: Herbarz polski od średniowiecza do XX wieku : ponad 4500 herbów szlacheckich 37 tysięcy nazwisk 55 tysięcy rodów. L&L, 2007, s. 406-539. ISBN 978-83-60597-10-1.
