= Dmitry Dashkov =

Russian politician

Dmitry Vasilyevich Dashkov
- Дмитрий Васильевич Дашков
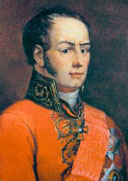

Prosecutor General of the Governing Senate
- In office 1829–1839
- Preceded by: Alexey Dolgorukov
- Succeeded by: Dmitry Bludov

Personal details
- Born: January 5, 1789 Moscow, Russian Empire
- Died: December 8, 1839 (aged 50) Saint Petersburg, Russian Empire
- Resting place: Lazarevskoe Cemetery of the Alexander Nevsky Lavra
- Relations: Dashkovs
- Education: Moscow University Noble Guesthouse
- Awards: Order of Saint Vladimir; Order of Saint Anna; Order of the White Eagle; Order of Saint Alexander Nevsky

Dmitry Vasilyevich Dashkov (January 5, 1789 – December 8, 1839) was a Russian statesman and writer. For the last ten years of his life, he headed the Ministry of Justice as minister. He was a founder of the Arzamas literary society.

== Early life ==
Dashkov was the son of the Ryazan landowner Vasily Andreyevich Dashkov (1749–1802), leader of the nobility of the Spassky district. He was educated at home before joining Moscow State University, where he earned two silver medals and was commemorated with his name in gold letters on a marble plaque.

== Political career ==
In October 1801, he joined the Moscow archive of the Collegium of Foreign Affairs, where he became friends with Dmitry Bludov. In 1810, when Ivan Dmitriev was appointed the Minister of Justice, Dashkov went to serve in the ministry, in Saint Petersburg.

On July 14, 1818, during the ministry of Count Kapodistrias and with the rank of State Councillor, he was appointed the second adviser to the Russian embassy in Constantinople. Recalled on January 3, 1820, from his post at the embassy, Dashkov, on behalf of the minister, engaged in reviewing the Russian consulates in the Levant. In 1822, he was appointed manager of the Constantinople mission; and the following year he was appointed a member of the Council of the Drafting Law Commission, while continuing his position in the department of the Foreign Collegium.

The accession of Nicholas I of Russia to the throne brought about Dashkov's rapid rise, partly due to Dashkov's friendship with Bludov. At the end of 1826, Dashkov received the title of Secretary of State and was appointed assistant minister of the interior.

In 1826 and 1835, he served on commissions looking into the peasant question. At the initiative of Dashkov, the composition of the Senate office was improved, the clerical work in the Senate was subject to certain rules, which improved the reporting of cases and rules for the Senate.

In 1828, he received the Order of Saint Anna 1st class and was appointed to service with Nicholas I at army headquarters during the Russo-Turkish War of 1828–29. Upon returning from there, on March 26, 1829, he was appointed fellow Minister of Justice and awarded the rank of Privy Councillor.

On April 24 of the same year, Dashkov was ordered to take charge of the spiritual affairs of foreign confessions during the absence of State Secretary Bludov, and in the absence of Prince Dolgoruky he took over the Ministry of Justice. He was awarded the Order of the White Eagle.

In 1829, he was appointed to a special committee to deal with problems in the aftermath of the recent war with Turkey. The committee, acting on a proposal of foreign minister Karl Nesselrode and Dashov, recommended leniency, which Nicholas I endorsed, opting "for the maintenance of the established order and against unpredictable and fearsome change."

On February 2, 1832, he was called to the post of Minister of Justice, while retaining the title of state secretary. In the same year, he was awarded the Order of Saint Alexander Nevsky for excellent service.

He participated in drafting the first Code of Laws of the Russian Empire, organized an inventory of the affairs of the Moscow Archive.

On February 14, 1839, he was promoted to the rank of Active Privy Councillor, appointed member of the State Council, made Chairman of the Department of Laws and Head of the Second Division of His Majesty's Chancellery, with the title of general manager, which was then assigned to all subsequent heads of the Second Division.

It is known that, while in the post of Minister of Justice, he once objected to Emperor Nicholas I of Russia that a proposed measure for Nicholas to take supreme command was contrary to existing laws.

== Literary activity ==
Dashkov's initial literary experiments date to his time at the university hostel and consist of translations from French: in the second book of the "Morning Dawn" of 1803 his idyll is printed: "Traces of the Golden Age", in the third book of 1805 his article appeared: "On Suicide", and in 1804 in the periodical: "And Rest in Favor", he placed an essay entitled: "Sciences, Arts, Scientists, Artists and Universities in Germany".

Literary fame is associated with his active participation in the debate about the old and new styles. The article "Analysis of 'Two Articles from La Harpe'" in the "Flower Garden" of 1810, Nos. 11 and 12, contains an analysis of Shishkov's book: "Translation of Two Articles from La Harpe", published back in 1808. In the book "On the Easiest Way to Object to Criticism" (Saint Petersburg, 1811), he proved that some of the examples cited by Shishkov from old books, as the beauty of the Slavic language, are just a literal translation from Greek.

Ivan Dmitriev instructed him to publish Zhukovsky's "Singer in the Camp of Russian Warriors", to which Dashkov wrote notes.

In 1810, Dashkov was elected a member of the Saint Petersburg Free Society of Lovers of Literature, Science, and the Arts and in the organ of society: "Saint Petersburg Herald" published several articles and notes signed with the letter 'D'. In the first part of the Saint Petersburg Bulletin of 1812, an article with a guiding value: "Something About Magazines", then two reviews: one on "The History of Suvorov" by Yegor Fuchs, the other on "Voltaire's Jokes", and finally, an anonymous review to Shishkov's book: "Adding to Conversations About Literature, or Objections to Objections Made to This Book".

In 1812, he was expelled from the Free Society of Lovers of Literature, Science, and the Arts, where at one time he was chairman. This was due to the admission to the Society of Count Khvostov, to which Dashkov objected but was forced to obey the majority. At Khostov's initiation, Dashkov greeted him with a speech in which he ironically extolled his creations with the term "Conversations". The next day, Khvostov invited Dashkov to dinner and made him understand that he understood the mockery, but was not angry. Others from the "Society", however, considered that Dashkov had insulted a member of the company and was subject to exclusion based on the charter.

In 1813, Dashkov, on behalf of Ivan Dmitriev, published "The Singer in the Camp of Russian Warriors", with the publisher's notes signed by the initials D. D.. In 1820, he also published a pamphlet by Sergey Uvarov and Konstantin Batyushkov: "On Greek Anthology". In addition, Dashkov prepared a translation of some of Herder's works in the manuscript and intended it for a Russian-German literary collection entitled Aonids, the publication of which Zhukovsky intended to begin in 1817 or 1818.

With almost all members of the society of "Arzamas geese" Dashkov, "Chu", was briefly familiar with many of them who conducted active friendly correspondence and was a recognized authority in the field of literary and artistic criticism. In 1814, Vasily Pushkin dedicated a poem to Dashkov: "My Dear Friend in a Country Where the Volga Flows Along with the River Banks...".

Together with Dmitry Bludov and Vasily Zhukovsky, Dashkov was the founder and one of the most active members of the Arzamas literary society and was nicknamed "Chu" here. In 1815, he was one of the worst persecutors of Prince Shakhovskoy, who in his comedy: "A Lesson in Coquette or Lipetsk Waters" ridiculed Zhukovsky, introducing the poet Fialkin in comedy. In the "Son of the Fatherland" of 1815 (Part 25, No. 42, Pages 140–148), Dashkov printed: "Letter to the Newest Aristophanes", in which he exposed Prince Shakhovsky as an intriguer, envious and guilty of Ozerov's death, then composed a cantata against Shakhovsky, which was sung choir by all Arzamasers. This cantata was published by Pimen Arapov in the Annals of the Russian Theater (pages 241–242), and extracts from it were put in the 1875 Russian Archive (Book III, page 358).

In 1816, at the meeting of Arzamas on the occasion of the election of Vasily Pushkin as his member, Dashkov made a speech directed generally against Shishkov's "Conversations of Lovers of the Russian Word" and in particular against Prince Shakhovsky. This speech was published in the Russian Archive of 1876 (Book I, pages 65–66).

During his four-year stay in Constantinople at the Russian embassy and then, while traveling in Greece, having thoroughly studied the Greek language and familiarizing himself with Greek poetry, Dashkov diligently searched for ancient manuscripts in various book depositories, and repeatedly tried to acquaint himself with the treasures of the Topkapi Palace library (the Seraglio Library). The result of his passion for Greek poetry and the search for manuscripts was a series of prose articles he wrote, as well as a number of poetic translations from Greek anthologies.

In Northern Flowers there were articles by Dashkov: "Mount Athos. Excerpt from a Trip to Greece in 1820" (1825, Pages 119–161), "The News of Greek and Latin Manuscripts in the Seraglio Library" (1825, Pages 162–165), "Russian Fans in Jerusalem. Excerpt from a Trip to Greece and Palestine in 1820" (1826, Pages 214–283), "A Few More Words About the Seraglio Library" (1826, Pages 283–296). The last article is Dashkov's response to the comments of the Bologna General Bulletin, which doubted the reliability of Dashkov's published writings about the Seraglio Library.

In the same Northern Flowers (1825, Pages 305–312), Dashkov's translations were published in verses under the title: "Flowers Selected from Greek Apeology", then poetic translations from Greek under the same title were published in the Polar Star in 1825 (Pages 278–286) and in the Moscow Telegraph of 1828 (Volume XIX, No. 1, Page 46), in the last journal without any signature.

In 1838, at the suggestion of Alexander Shishkov, Dashkov was elected a member of the Russian Academy.

== Family ==
Dashkov's wife (from May 30, 1830) was Elizaveta Vasilyevna Pashkova (1809–1890), daughter of the wealthy miner Vasily Pashkov. According to a contemporary, Madame Dashkova was a typical high-ranking woman: beautiful, domineering, of direct character, and of a lively, serious mind. In 1835, the Dashkov couple became owners of the Blagoveshchensk Smelter near Ufa. The marriage resulted in four children:

- Anna (August 16, 1831 – March 23, 1858), was baptized on August 21, 1831, in the Simeonovskaya Church in the presence of the cousin of Prince Alexander Vasilchikov and grandmother Elizabeth Pashkova; maid of honor of the court, married (since September 22, 1853) to the fligel-adjutant of Nicholas I Count Adam Rzhevusky (1801–1888), later general-adjutant. She died during the birth of her daughter Catherine.
- Vasily (1832 – March 28, 1838), who died of brain inflammation.
- Dmitry (1833–1901), the leader of the nobility of the Spassky district of the Ryazan Governorate, writer. According to a contemporary, he was an extremely intelligent and educated person, a typical 1860s intelligentsia, a convinced liberal Zemstvo activist, who had been fighting in Ryazan with Count Dmitry Tolstoy for his whole time because of the Zemstvo teacher's seminary and other issues that worried the Zemstvo in those days.
- Andrei (1834–1904), chairman of the Ufa Zemsky Council.

== Death ==
In 1839, he died of Tabes dorsalis in Saint Petersburg and was buried in the Alexander Nevsky Monastery.

== Sources ==
- Dashkov, Dmitry Vasilievich // Russian Biographical Dictionary: in 25 Volumes – Saint Petersburg – Moscow, 1896–1918
- Dashkov, Dmitry Vasilievich // Brockhaus and Efron Encyclopedic Dictionary: in 86 Volumes (82 Volumes and 4 Additional) – Saint Petersburg, 1890–1907
