= Dmitry Khvostov =

Russian poet (1757–1835)

Dmitry Ivanovich Khvostov
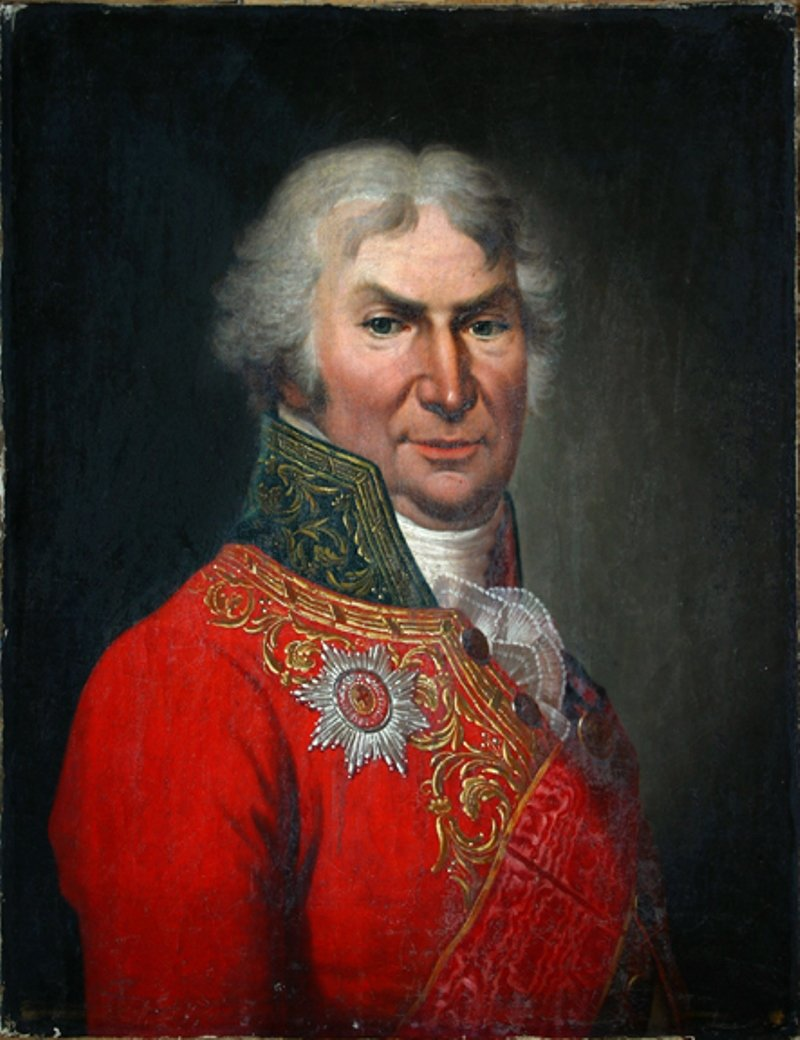
- Portrait by Stepan Shchukin
- Born: July 30 [O.S. July 19] 1757; Saint Petersburg
- Died: November 2 [O.S. October 22] 1835; Saint Petersburg
- Occupation: Poet • Dramatist

Count Dmitry Ivanovich Khvostov (Russian: граф Дми́трий Ива́нович Хвосто́в, July 30 [O.S. July 19] 1757 – November 2 [O.S. October 22] 1835), was a Russian poet, representing the late period of classicism in Russian literature. Count Khvostov, as he was widely known, was an exceedingly prolific author of poems, fables, epigrams, etc., invariably archaic and pompous, making him an easy target for humourists and fellow poets (Pushkin among them) who ridiculed him relentlessly. In modern times much has been done to separate the comical myth from Khvostov's real legacy (with some fake 'Khvostovism' exposed) and give credit to an extraordinary poetry enthusiast (who was also an avid literary researcher and archivist), but the stereotype prevails and the name of Count Khvostov remains synonymous in Russia with wanton graphomania and self-important pomposity.

== Biography ==
Dmitry Ivanovich Khvostov was born in 1757 in Saint Petersburg, into a respected family of Russian aristocrats, the origins of which can be traced back to the 13th century. He received a fine education at home, studied in a private boarding-school, and then at Moscow University. In 1772 Khvostov joined the prestigious Preobrazhensky regiment (where he, admittedly, "rarely mounted a horse, save Pegasus"). After retirement in 1779 Khvostov served as an official in the Russian Senate 2nd department, where he later translated The Study on Finance by the French Finance minister Jacques Necker, for Prince Alexander Vyazemsky. In 1789 Khvostov married Princess A. I. Gorchakova, Alexander Suvorov's niece, and it was Suvorov, first a mentor, then a close friend and confidante, who in 1799 asked the King of Sardinia to grant the title of Count to his relative who three years later received official permission to use it and became Count Khvostov. He worked as a secretary in the Senate, then (from 1799) in the Synod. In 1807 he became a Senator, and in 1818 a State Councillor. In 1831 Count Khvostov retired, with the reputation of a perfectly honest, incorruptible bureaucrat and a very modest, good-humoured, likeable person. As many people who knew Khvostov attested, he had but one vice, his abnormal passion for writing (and, what was more serious, publishing) his own poetry which, in the end, proved to be his undoing. Suvorov himself, according to legend, on his deathbed implored his friend to stop writing, but this last wish of the great man remained unfulfilled.

=== Literary career ===
Young Dmitry Khvostov grew up in a literary environment: relatives such as Alexander Sumarokov, Vasily Maykov and Alexander Karin were often guests at his parents's home in Saint Petersburg. In 1777 Dmitry Khvostov debuted with a comedy play called A Credulous One; it was staged at the Court theater. From the very beginning till the end Khvostov was a strict follower and promoter of classicism. Jean Racine's Andromaque (1794) and Nicolas Boileau-Despréaux's L'Art poétique translated by Khvostov (the latter under the title of The Science of Verse-making, in 1808) went through several editions. In 1791 Khvostov was elected a member of the Russian Academy. From the formation of the Colloquy of Lovers of the Russian Word in 1811 Khvostov became one of its most active members.

Khvostov was passionately in love with poetry which for sixty years remained his main interest in life. "I love to write verse and see it printed": this self-proclaimed credo he even used as an epigraph for the 2nd edition of the Complete Khvostov collection (1817–1818). Never doubting his poetic gift, Khvostov produced vast amounts of poetry; odes, epitaphs, elegies, madrigals, epigrams, etc., which were generally seen as banal, wordy, extravagantly pompous, rich with unnecessary allegories and inversions. Quintessential classicism with its full set of clichés, Khvostov's poems became an easy target for parodists.

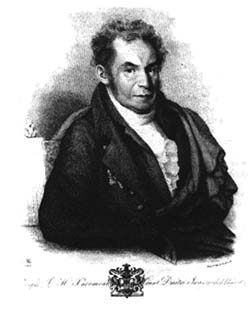
Engraving, from a drawing by Orest Kiprensky (1812)

Since publishers avoided Khvostov with his ever-growing bulk of produce, he invested money in the business of self-publishing. The Complete Khvostov went through three editions. Before publishing the next edition, the author bought all the unsold copies of the previous one and spread them to all quarters. He sent thousands of books (along with statues and busts of his own) to Russian and European universities, academies, schools, cadet headquarters, scientists and statesmen. Each time, starting out in a coach from Saint Petersburg to his Novgorodskaya gubernia estate, he took bunches of his own books along with him, leaving copies at every postal station for anyone who'd care to read them.

In 1802 Select Fables from the Best of Russian Verse came out and administered the fatal blow to Khvostov's reputation. His characters did the most improbable things: a dove "gnawed himself out of the net" after being entangled in "Two Doves", an ass climbed a rowan-tree ("An Ass and a Rowan-tree") and a crow dropped a piece of cheese from its 'jaws' ("A Crow and a Cheese"). Equally bizarre were the author's footnotes and commentaries, of which there were many. The cheese incident has been explained thus: "Some criticized the use of the word 'jaws' for it can relate only to beasts, not birds. This author is well aware that a bird's mouth is called a 'beak', but he chose to find for it an allegoric substitute because a crow here is a symbol of a man, and of a man one might easily say: 'He gaped and his jaw dropped'; see the Russian Academy dictionary".

Count Khvostov's Fables became very popular, for all the wrong reasons. Members of the Arzamas Society kept the book on their table to amuse themselves from time to time, as Pyotr Vyazemsky remembered. Vasily Zhukovsky devoted the whole of his Arzamas inception speech to Khvostov's Fables. Pyotr Vyazemsky, Vasily Zhukovsky, Anton Delvig, Ivan Dmitriev, Alexander Voeykov, Nikolay Yazykov and Alexander Izmaylov all wrote epigrams on Khvostov. In a satire called A Singer in a Colloquy Konstantin Batyushkov presented Khvostov as the cossack ataman Platov, "a reader's tyrant" whose poetry was "his drum, unbearable for the ears." Pushkin in his "Ode to His Highness Count Dm. Iv. Khvostov" made fun of the latter's tendency to produce countless footnotes (which made the commentary pages longer than the verses themselves), warning Wilhelm Küchelbecker and Kondraty Ryleyev against falling into the same ode-ish stylistic trap.

Khvostov, being an extraordinarily mild and good-humoured man, endured this barrage of ridicule stoically. Giving credit to his love of literature, the sympathetic Nikolay Karamzin wrote to Dmitriev in 1824: "Count Khvostov with his unbroken passion for verse-making is very touching to me. Here is love that is worthy of a talent. He's got none, but he'd deserve having it." Konstantin Batyushkov wrote of Khvostov: "Generations will come and go, and simply for being so infamous, he will become quite famous."
