= Anna Bunina =

Russian poet (1774–1829)

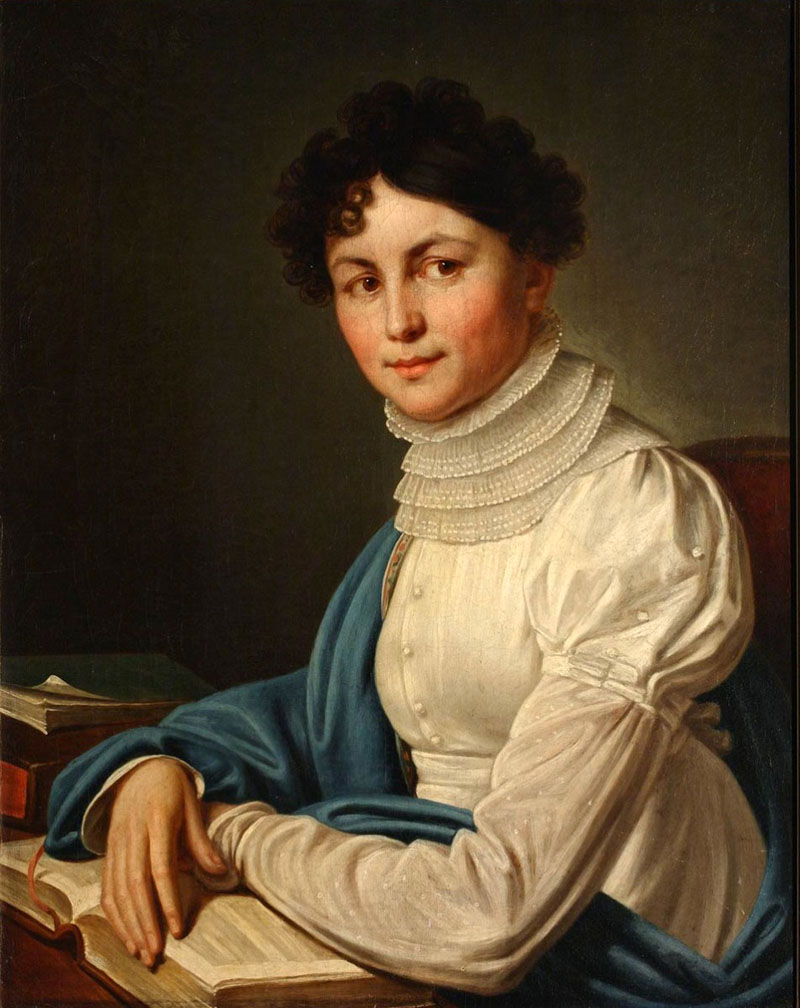
- Portrait by Alexander Varnek, 1823
- Born: Anna Petrovna Bunina; January 18, 1774; Urusovo, Ryazan Governorate, Russian Empire
- Died: December 16, 1829 (aged 55); Denisovka, Ryazan Governorate, Russian Empire
- Writing career
- Genre: Poetry

Anna Petrovna Bunina (Russian: Анна Петровна Бунина, IPA: [ˈannə pʲɪˈtrovnə ˈbunʲɪnə]; January 18, 1774 – December 16, 1829) was a Russian poet. She was the first female Russian writer to make a living solely from literary work. She belonged to the same noble family that Ivan Bunin and Vasily Zhukovsky belonged to.

== Biography ==
Anna was born in the village of Urusovo in Ryazan Governorate (present day Lipetsk Oblast). Her mother died in childbirth. She was raised by various relatives, and received only a rudimentary education. She began writing around the age of 13. She published her first work in 1799.

She moved to Saint Petersburg in 1802 with the help of a small inheritance from her father, where she established her own home and furthered her education by employing tutors. She devoted herself entirely to writing, supporting herself with help from patrons, and profits from the sales of her works. The Russian Imperial Family awarded her pensions in 1809, 1810 and 1813. From 1807 to 1810 she was part of the literary circle of Gavrila Derzhavin and Alexander Shishkov. She had been introduced to Shishkov by her family connections, and he became a mentor to her.

In 1811, she was given honorary membership in the Lovers of the Russian Word. Her first work The Inexperienced Muse was published in 1809, followed by a second volume under the same title in 1812. She travelled to Britain in 1815-17 for breast cancer treatment, which was unsuccessful. She published a volume entitled Collected Works in 1819. In 1820, she was made an honorary member of the Free Society of Lovers of Literature, Science, and the Arts. She left Saint Petersburg in 1824 due to continuing illness, and lived with relatives, but retained financial independence. She died in Denisovka, Ryazan Governorate in 1829, aged 55, and was buried at Urusovo.

== Critical reception ==
She used more varied themes and style, and a wider metrical range in her works than earlier female Russian poets. Her work includes original and noteworthy observations on the experiences of women, especially when she focuses on their conflicts with men. Her poetry was popular at the time; she became famous and was satirised by the Colloquium's rivals, including the Arzamas Society. Her works were forgotten to a large extent after her death, due in some measure to the attacks on her and her works by the Arzamas Society and others, limiting her influence on future poets.

== English translations ==
- Bunina, Anna (1994) [1813]. "'Though poverty's no stain'". In Kelly, Catriona (ed.). An Anthology of Russian Women's Writing, 1777–1992. Oxford University Press. pp. 3–8. ISBN 9780198715054.
- Bunina, Anna (1994) [1818]. "Conversation Between Me and the Women". In Kelly, Catriona (ed.). An Anthology of Russian Women's Writing, 1777–1992. Oxford University Press. pp. 8–11. ISBN 9780198715054.
