= Gabrielle Radziwill =

Lithuanian pacifist and women's rights activists

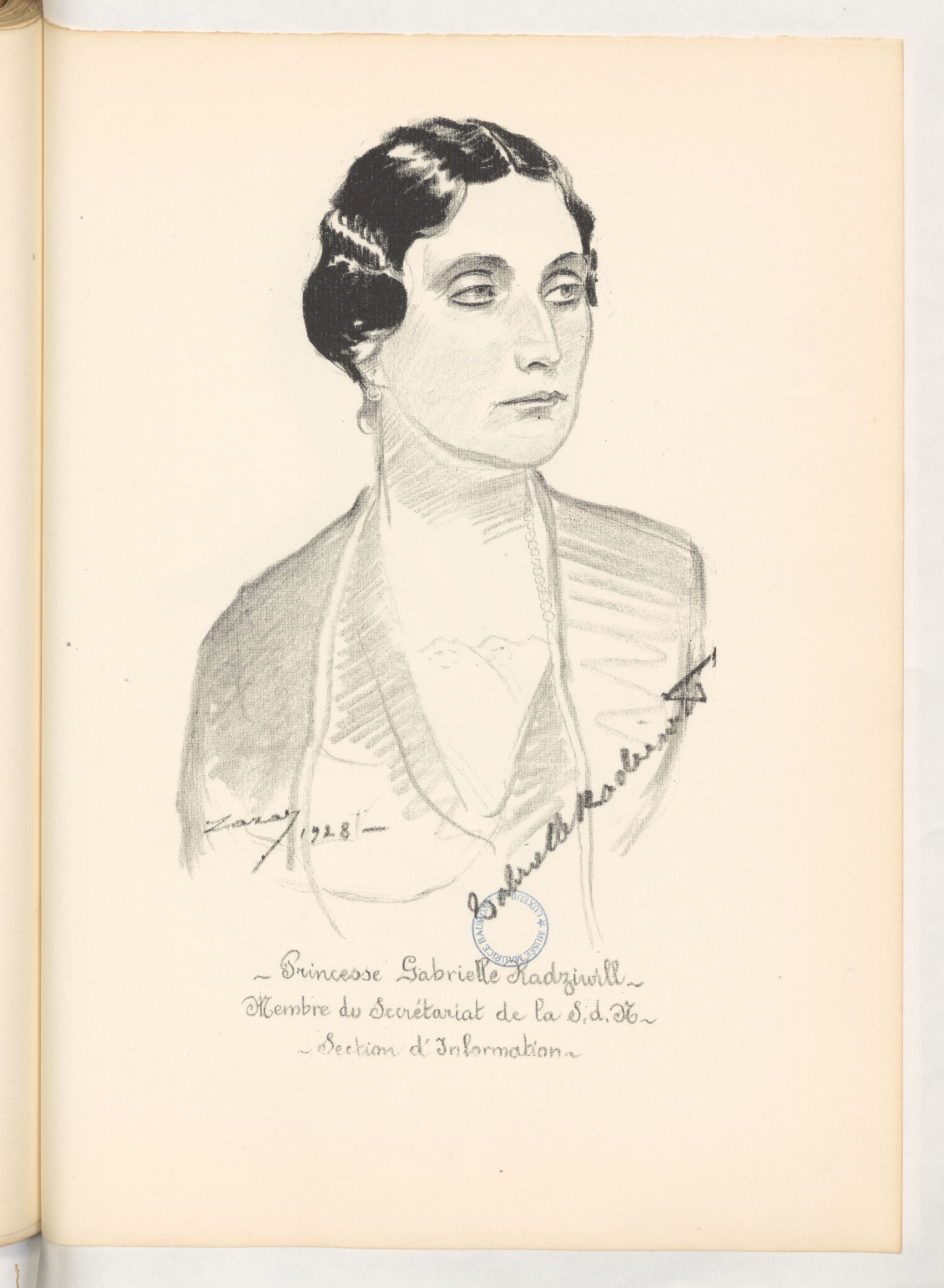
- Portrait by Oscar Lazar, 1928
- Born: Gabrielle Jeanne Anne Marie Radziwill; 14 March 1878; Berlin, German Empire
- Died: 9 January 1968 (aged 89); Havilland Hall, United Kingdom
- Noble family: Radziwill
- Father: Prince Wilhelm Radziwiłł
- Mother: Countess Catherine Rzewuska

Princess Gabrielle Jeanne Anne Marie Radziwill (14 March 1878 – 9 January 1968) was a Lithuanian nurse, pacifist and women's rights activist. She was one of the first women to join the League of Nations, where she was active from 1920 to 1934.

== Biography ==
Radziwill was born in Berlin as the daughter of the Polish aristocrats Wilhelm Radziwiłł and his wife, Catherine, née Rzewuska. Her grandfathers were Russian general Adam Rzewuski and Prussian general Fryderyk Wilhelm Radziwiłł.

Before joining the Secretariat of the League of Nations in November 1920, Radziwill had spent two years working for the Russian Red Cross on the Russian-Persian front, where she was in charge of hospitals. Active in women's organizations, in the League, she was a strong supporter of women's interests, calling for cooperation with the women's movement. In connection with relationships between the League and women's societies, she stressed: "I shall always be ready to do what I can to help and further the aims of the women's organizations — even when I do not see eye to eye with them!"

In the League of Nations, she was initially employed as a Senior Assistant in the Information Section but was promoted to Member of the Section in 1927. In 1931, she was transferred to the Social Questions and Opium Traffic Section and, in 1934, to the Intellectual Cooperation and International Bureaux Section, where she worked until she left in December 1938.

Speaking at the International Council of Women congress in 1925, Radziwill announced that the "League needs the work of women, and we women need the League of Nations' help, because the work that we are doing can only bear fruit if it is really sanctioned by our Governments and we women must help this sanction to be given."

== See also ==
- List of peace activists
