= Basmanny District =

District of Central Administrative Okrug of Moscow, Russia

Coordinates: 55°45′53.81″N 37°40′17.70″E

Basmanny District in Moscow

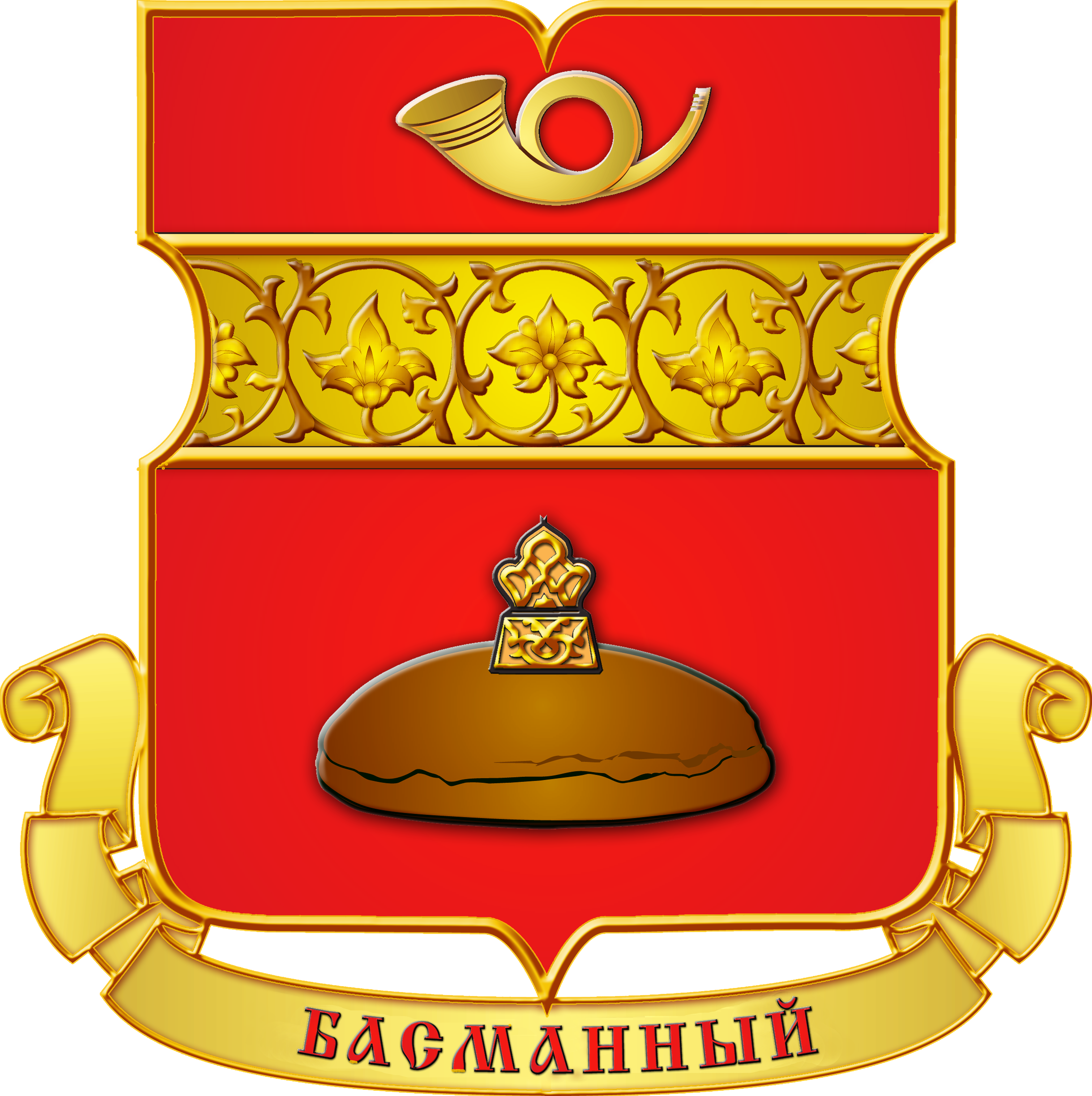
Coat of arms of Basmanny District

Basmanny District (Russian: Басманный район) is a district of Central Administrative Okrug of the federal city of Moscow, Russia. Population: 108,204 (2010 census); 100,899 (2002 census).

The district extends northeast from Kitai-gorod, within the radial boundaries of Vorontsovo Pole Street and Yauza River in the south and Myasnitskaya Street and Novaya Basmannaya Street in the north. It also includes the territory of Lefortovo Hospital on the opposite, southern bank of Yauza (between the river and Gospitalny Val Street). Historical Lefortovskaya Square also lies within Basmanny District, on the northern side of Yauza.

The district contains Kursky Rail Terminal, historical areas of Khitrovka, Clean Ponds, Red Gates (shared with Krasnoselsky District), German Quarter and Basmannaya Sloboda. It retains memorial buildings of Petrine Baroque, Neoclassicism and Art Nouveau periods. Its history is closely associated with Peter I of Russia, Matvey Kazakov and Alexander Pushkin. The district is home to Russia's largest engineering college, Moscow State Technical University.

== History and architecture ==
=== Kitai-gorod to Garden Ring ===
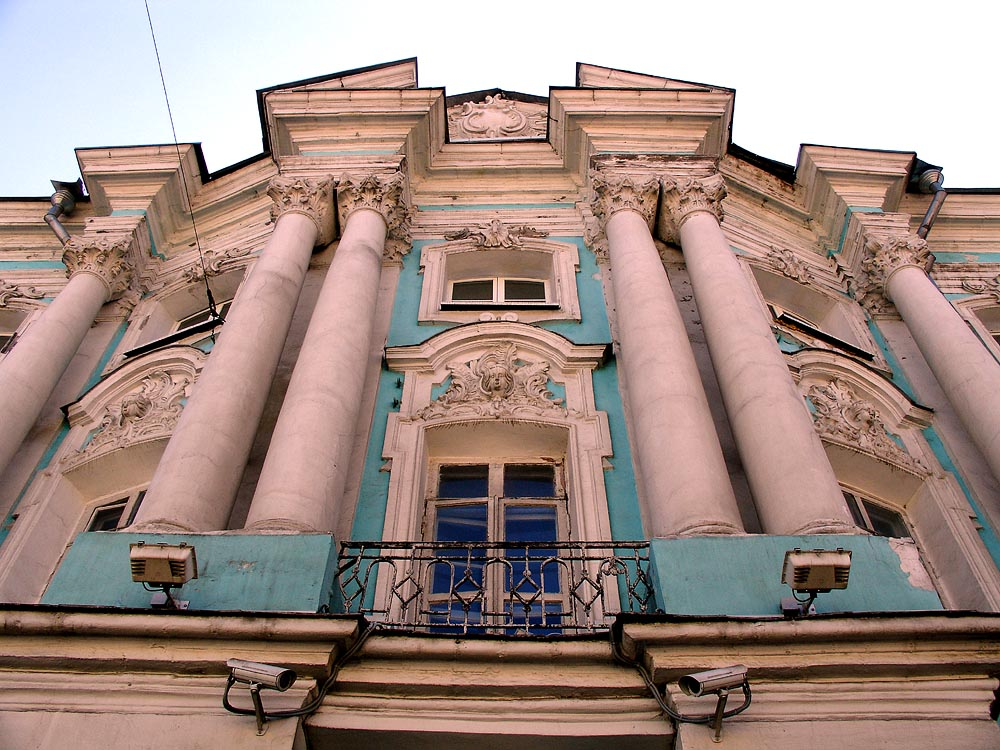
Apraksin-Trubetskoy Palace

Central part of the district, with radial Myasnitskaya Street, Pokrovka Street and Solyanka Street, was gradually urbanized since the 15th century. Central street, known as Maroseika and Pokrovka, was part of a royal route to country estates in Izmailovo and hosted court gardens and nobility; by 1638, 62 of 83 households belonged to upper classes (Sytin, p. 103). At the same time, it was popular among foreigners; however, in 1643 the Church persuaded Tsar Alexey to limit foreign presence and by 1652 all Catholics and Lutherans had to relocate to German Quarter, 2-3 kilometers north-west on the same route.

Most of the area burnt down in the Fire of 1812 and was rebuilt in neoclassical style. Notable 18th-century buildings include Menshikov Tower, a unique Petrine Baroque church that rivalled Ivan the Great Bell Tower in height, and late Baroque Apraksin-Trubetskoy palace (22, Pokrovka Street).

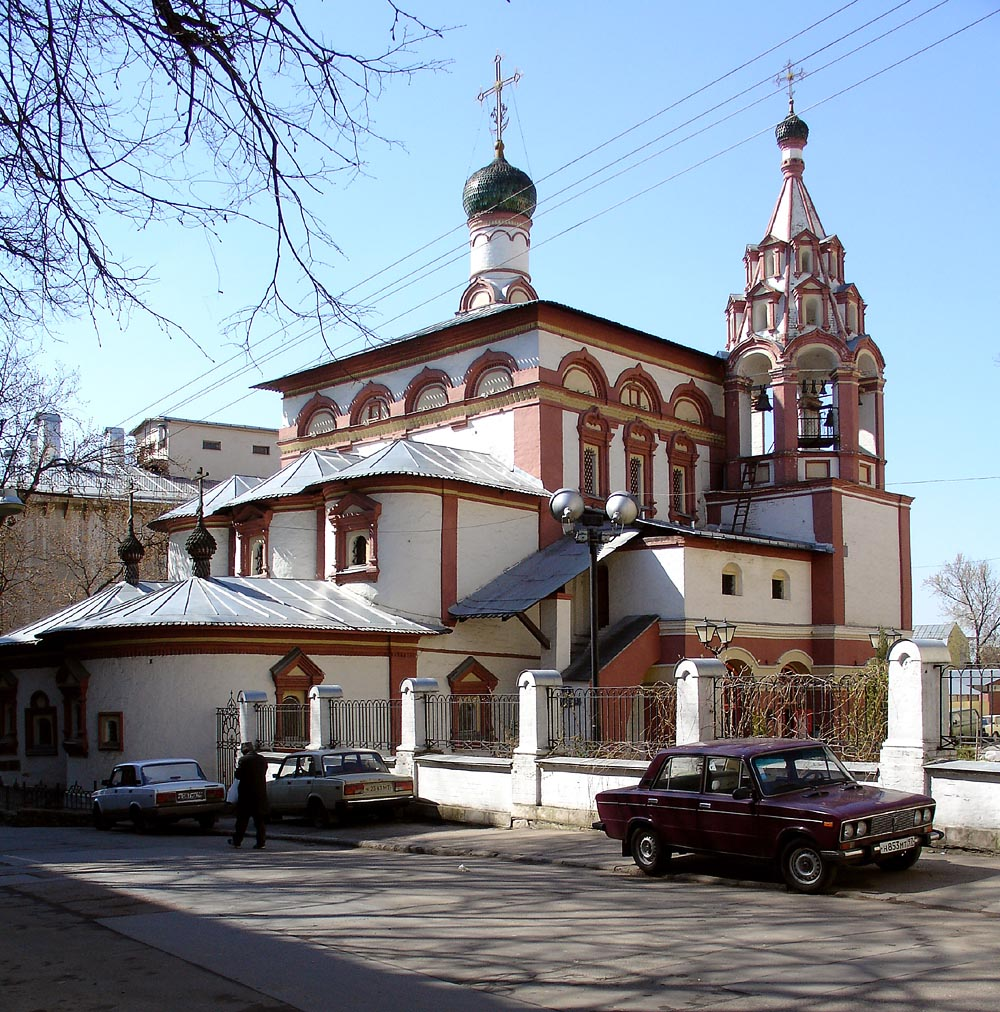
Church in former Khitrov Market

Date of foundation of Ivanovsky Convent (4, Zabelina Street) remains unknown; it was used as a high security prison for state prisoners like Maria Shuiskaya, wife of deposed Vasili IV of Russia, and Darya Saltykova. Present-day cathedral and towers were built by Mikhail Bykovsky in 1861. Nearby Moscow Choral Synagogue (10, Bolshoy Spasoglinischevsky Lane) was completed in 1906.

Armyansky Lane, in the beginning of Pokrovka Street, has been a hub of Moscow's Armenian community since the late 18th century, starting as the base of Lazarev merchant family of Armenian descent. Lazarev's Institute of Oriental Languages, founded in 1814, has been an official school for Russian diplomats since 1827; today, its neoclassical building houses the embassy of Armenia. Nearby Maly Zlatoustinsky Lane was home to Matvey Kazakov's home and workshop (recently demolished).

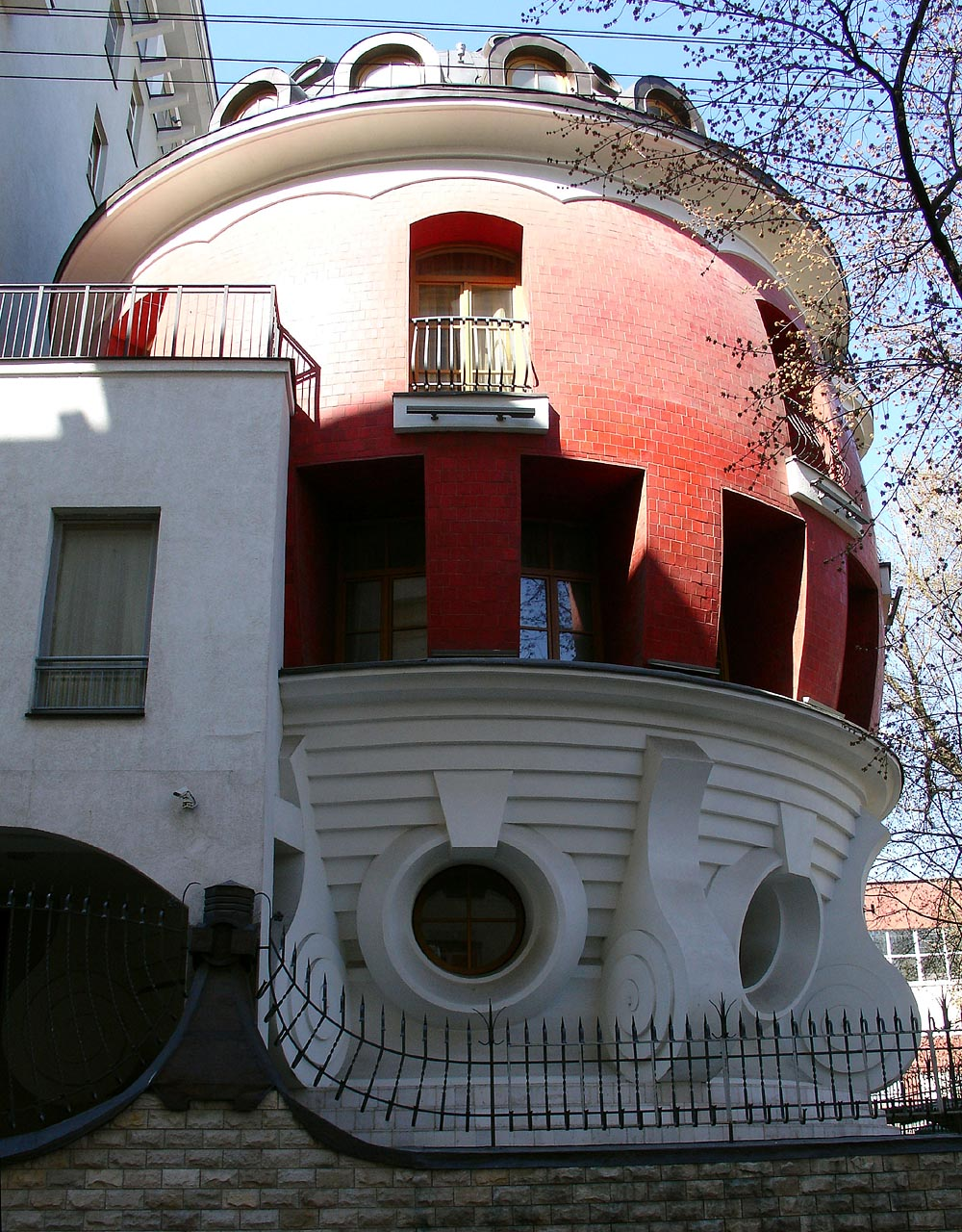
The Egg House in Mashkova Street, a 1998 design by Sergey Tkachenko, lists for 7 million US Dollars

Southern end of central Basmanny District hides the infamous Khitrovka – former "bottom of Moscow" between present-day Pokrovsky Boulevard, Khokhlovsky Lane and Solyanka Street. Khitrov market, set up in the 1820s, became a flophouse district in the 1860s and a gang land by the 1880s, concentrating thousands of former peasants who failed to adjust to city life. Many original buildings of Khitrovka still stand, although the market and the infamous flophouses were replaced college buildings.

In Soviet period, reconstruction of Basmanny District lagged behind that of western districts. In the 1930s, Basmanny lost landmarks like Red Gates and Assumption Church in Pokrovka, but overall city fabric remains unchanged, with an irregular maze of lanes and two-story historical buildings. Apartment buildings on the boulevards, instead of demolition, were expanded in depth and height, retaining original finishes.

=== Basmannaya Sloboda ===
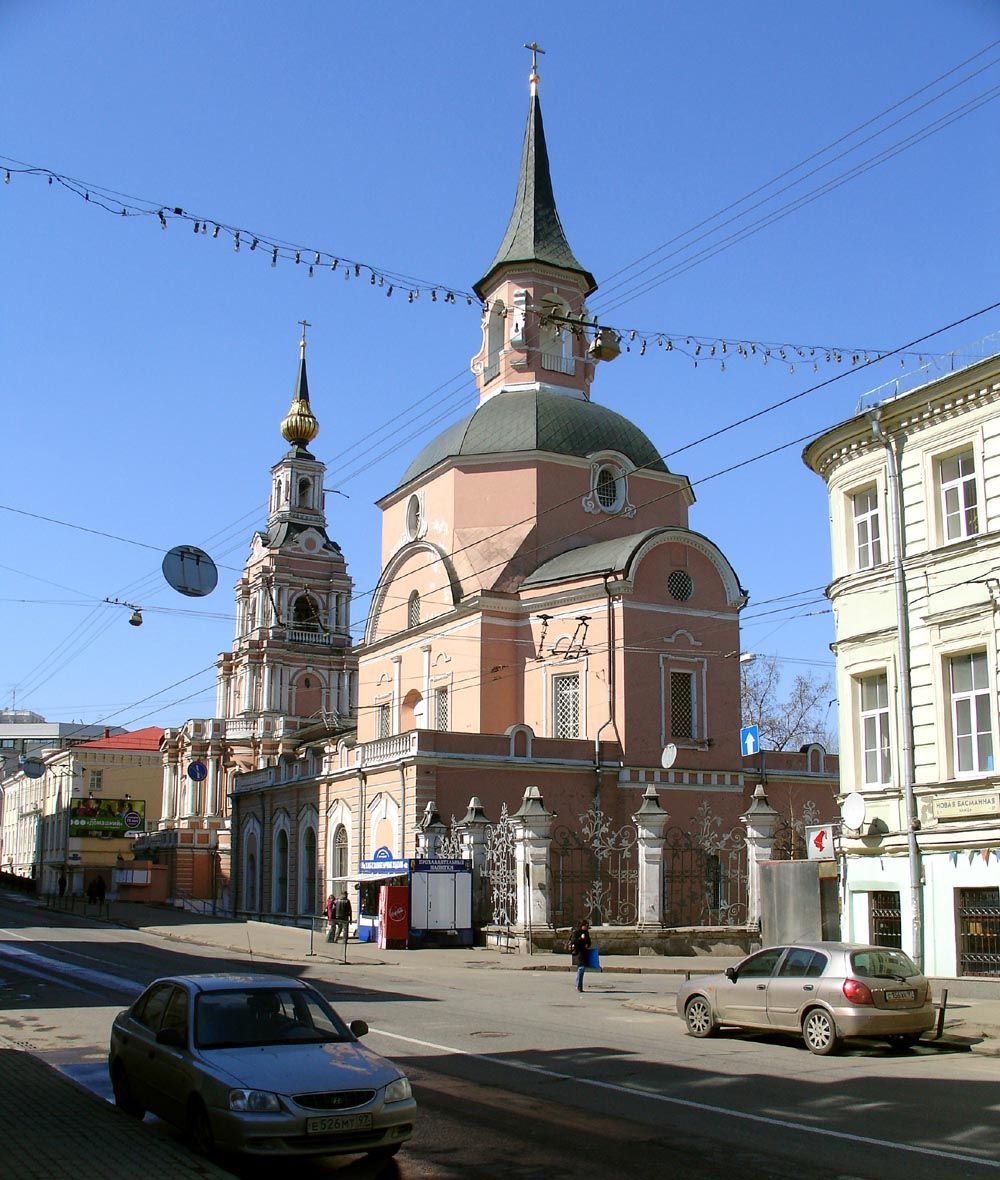
St. Peter and Paul, built to a drawing by Tsar Peter the Great

"Basman" in the 17th century referred to a particular sort of bread supplied to the court and troops, however, historians argue that Basmannaya sloboda was too large for bakers alone. This sloboda occupied the beginning of Staraya Basmannaya Street, while the present-day Novaya Basmannaya Street was known as Kapitanskaya (Captain's) sloboda and housed the officers of "European" troops established by Peter I. Church of St. Peter and Paul in this area was built in 1705–1723 to the draft made by Peter himself, in early Baroque style (the church technically stands in Krasnoselsky District).

Previous rulers travelled to their country estates via Staraya Basmannaya, however, Peter changed this habit in favor of Novaya Basmannaya, adding to the popularity of this street among the nobles. In the middle of the 18th century, when nobility was relieved from compulsory service, both streets were redeveloped with suburban estates of families like Rumyantsevs and Golitsyns. In the 1750s, they commissioned Dmitry Ukhtomsky to build the extant church of Martyr Nikita, the largest example of Baroque architecture in Moscow.

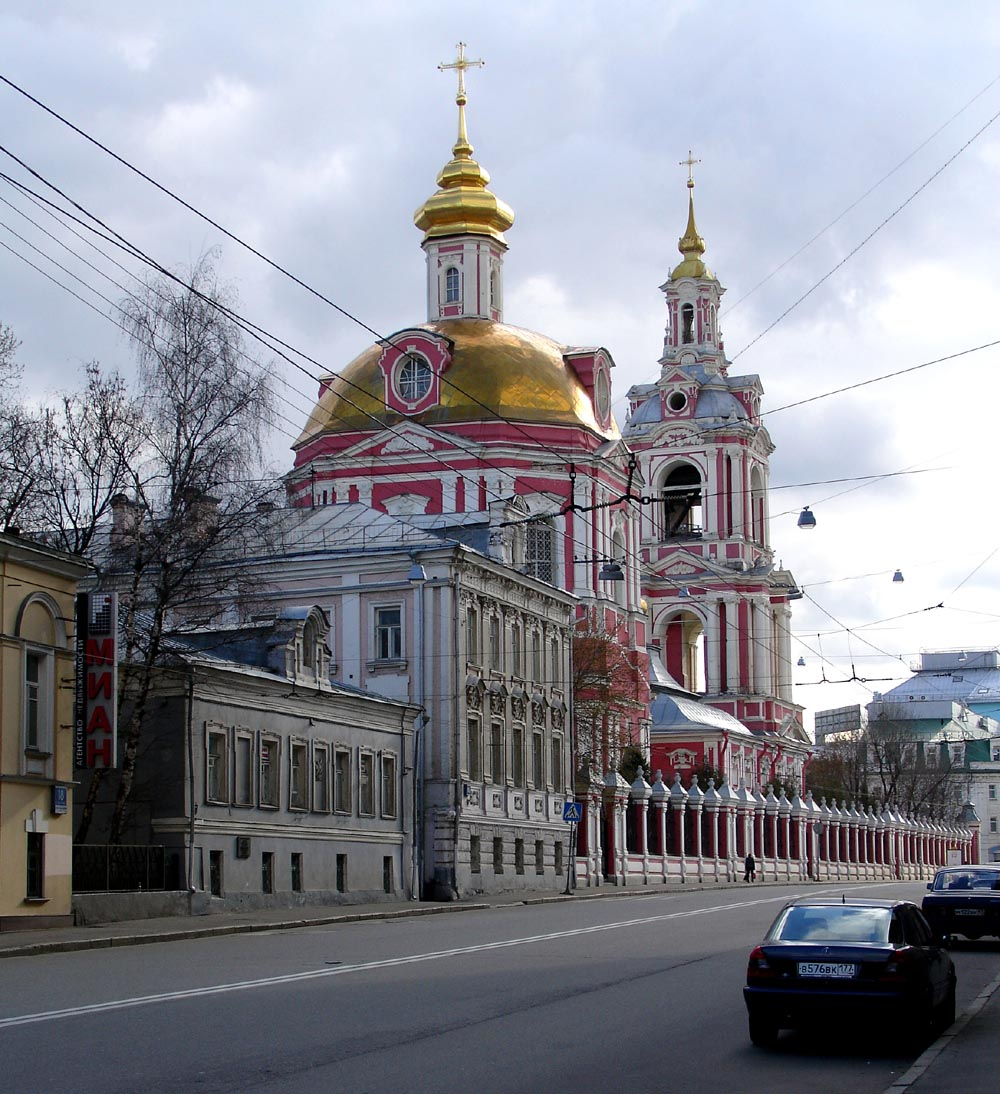
St. Nikita in Staraya Basmannaya Street

The area burnt down in 1812; some homeowners rebuilt their lots in stone, while others could allow only wooden buildings. Vasily Pushkin, uncle of Alexander Pushkin, owned such single-story wooden house at 36, Staraya Basmannaya. The poet himself was born in nearby Malaya Pochtovaya Street (exact location of his birthplace remains disputed and was previously stated as either 40 or 57, Baumanskaya Street).

In the 1900s-1910s, both streets acquired 5-7 storey apartment buildings in Art Nouveau and Neoclassical Revival styles. Most notable is 15, Staraya Basmannaya by Vasily Schaub with Fyodor Schechtel artwork and clear Vienna Secession features, built to order of Moscow's only Persian property developer (Naschokina, p. 432). In Soviet period, most of this architecture survived, excluding the blocks near the Garden Ring, which now house Ivan Fomin's constructivist "Tank Engine Building" (Ministry of Railways).

=== German Quarter ===
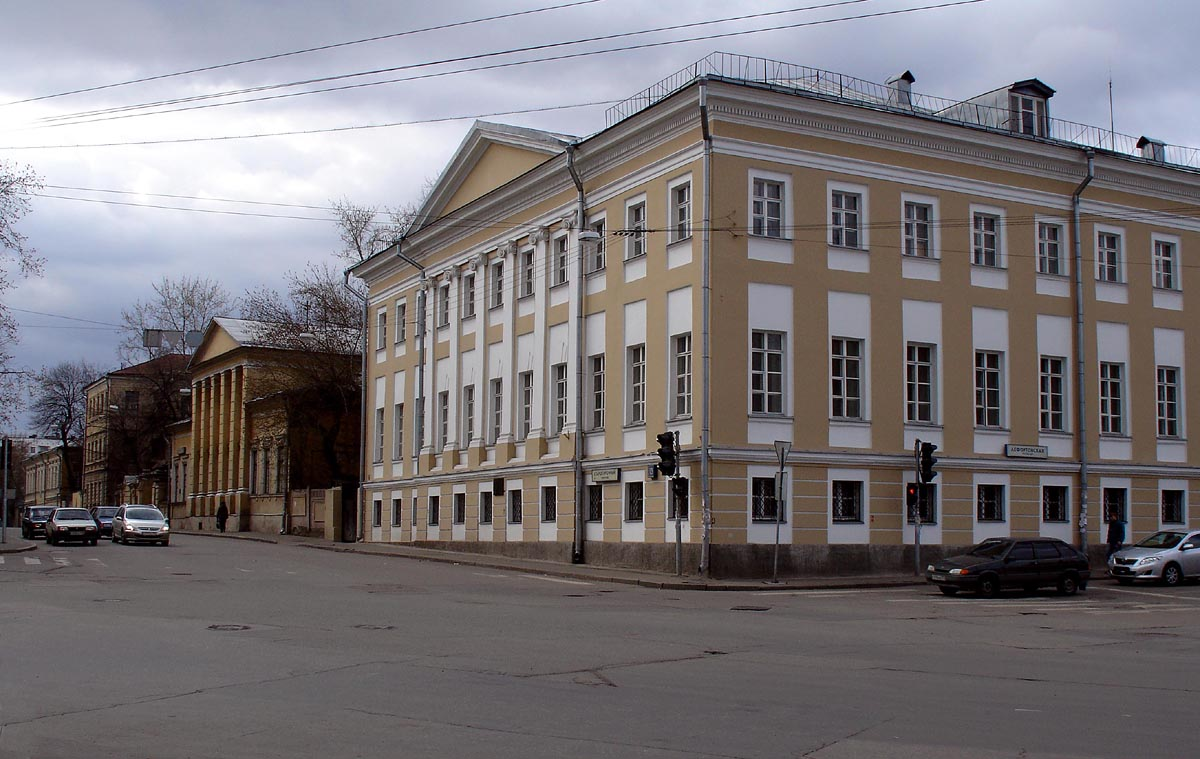
Lefortovskaya Square, hub of former German Quarter

Original German Quarter emerged between present-day Baumanskaya Street and Lefortovskaya Square in the late 16th century and was repopulated with Europeans of all nations after 1652, becoming then known as New German sloboda. By 1672, it had three Lutheran and two Calvinist churches (Sytin, p. 310) and numerous factories.

Tsar Peter, who grew up in nearby sloboda behind Yauza River, was a frequent guest in this settlement and built a palace for Franz Lefort (which later passed to Alexander Menshikov). The palace currently housed military archives. Present-day old hall of Moscow State Technical University, established in 1830, incorporated this palace, as well as former Alexander Bezborodko palace rebuilt by Domenico Giliardi.

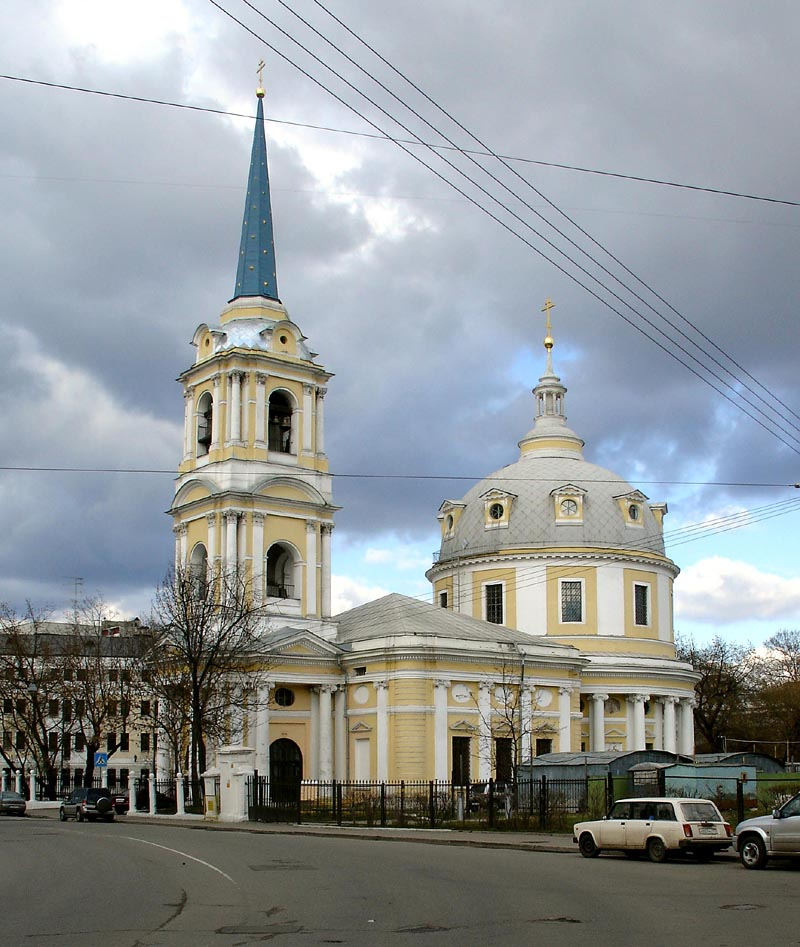
Ascension Church in Kazakov Street

After the fire of 1812, property changed owners, and by 1826 foreigners virtually disappeared from the former German Street (present-day Baumanskaya Street), replaced by local merchants and craftsmen. The district quickly industrialized, especially after Emancipation reform of 1861. Notable additions in the Soviet period were the TsAGI buildings in Radio Street and the numerous expansions of Technical University.

In the late 1990s, the area became the site of Lefortovo tunnel construction, completing the Third Ring freeway. February 23, 2006, a roof of Baumansky market in the center of German Quarter collapsed, killing 56. The land, cleared of rubble, is still vacant, used for storing impounded cars.

== Economy ==
Tupolev has its head office in the district.

== Name ==
Comes from Kazan Tatar nicknames Basman 15th-16th centuries in Russia called the bread prepared for the royal court. Word of Turkic origin, from the verb meaning "to push" ( Bashkir: баҫырға,Tatar: басырга, basyrga): the bread was "printed" on it squeezed the coat of arms.

== Gallery ==
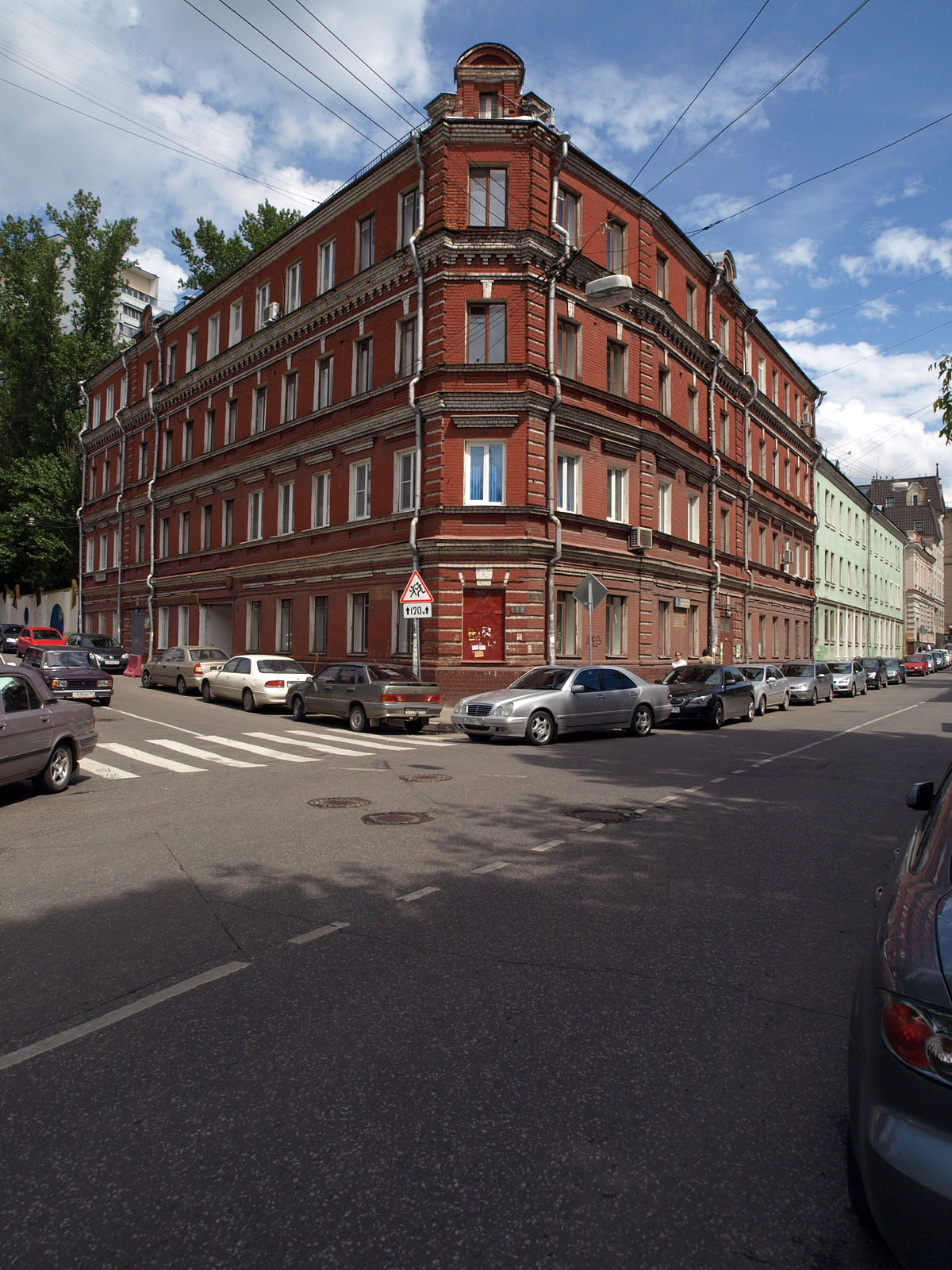
Aptekarsky Lane in German Quarter

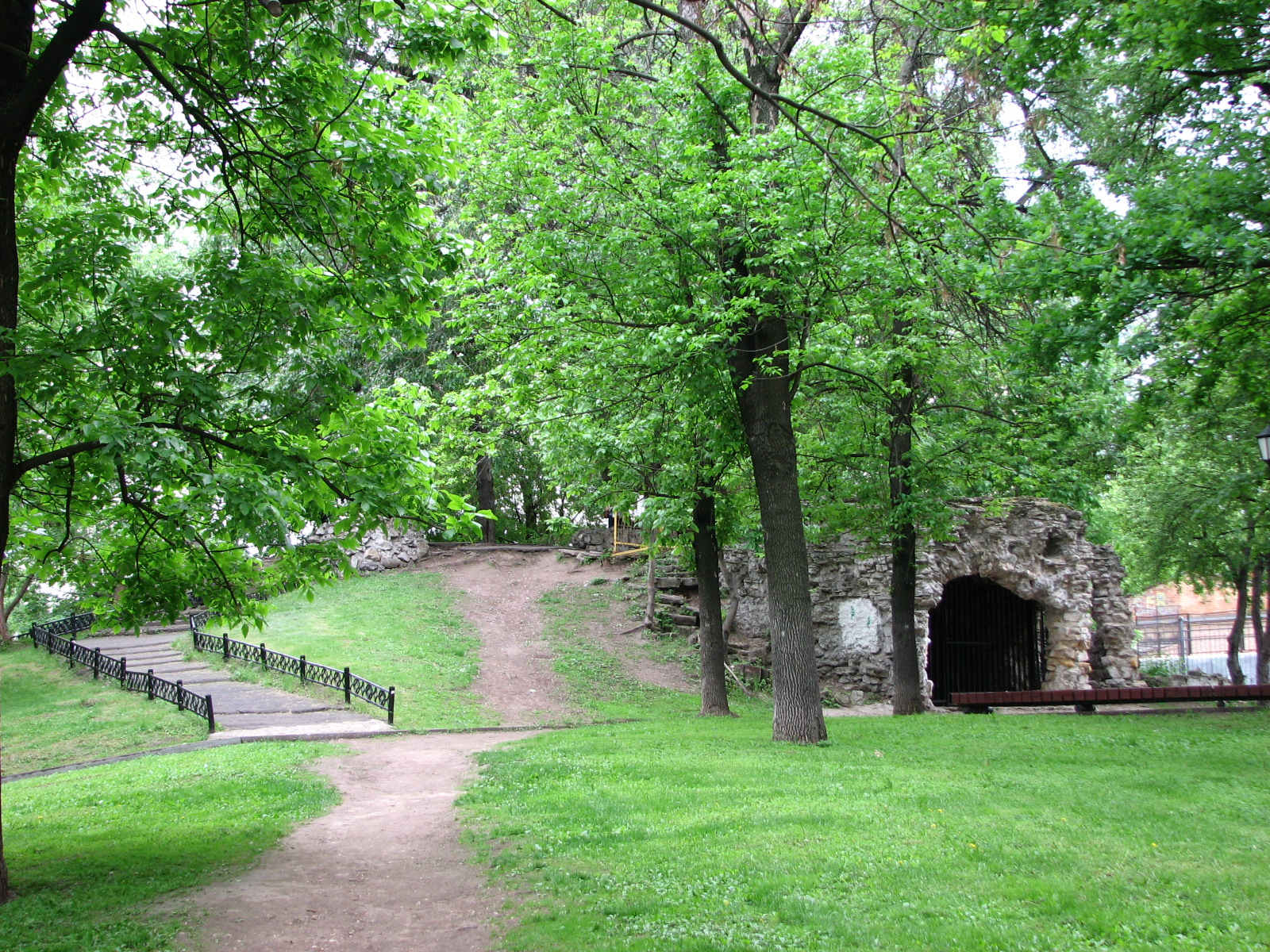
The Belvedere grotto of the Bauman Garden

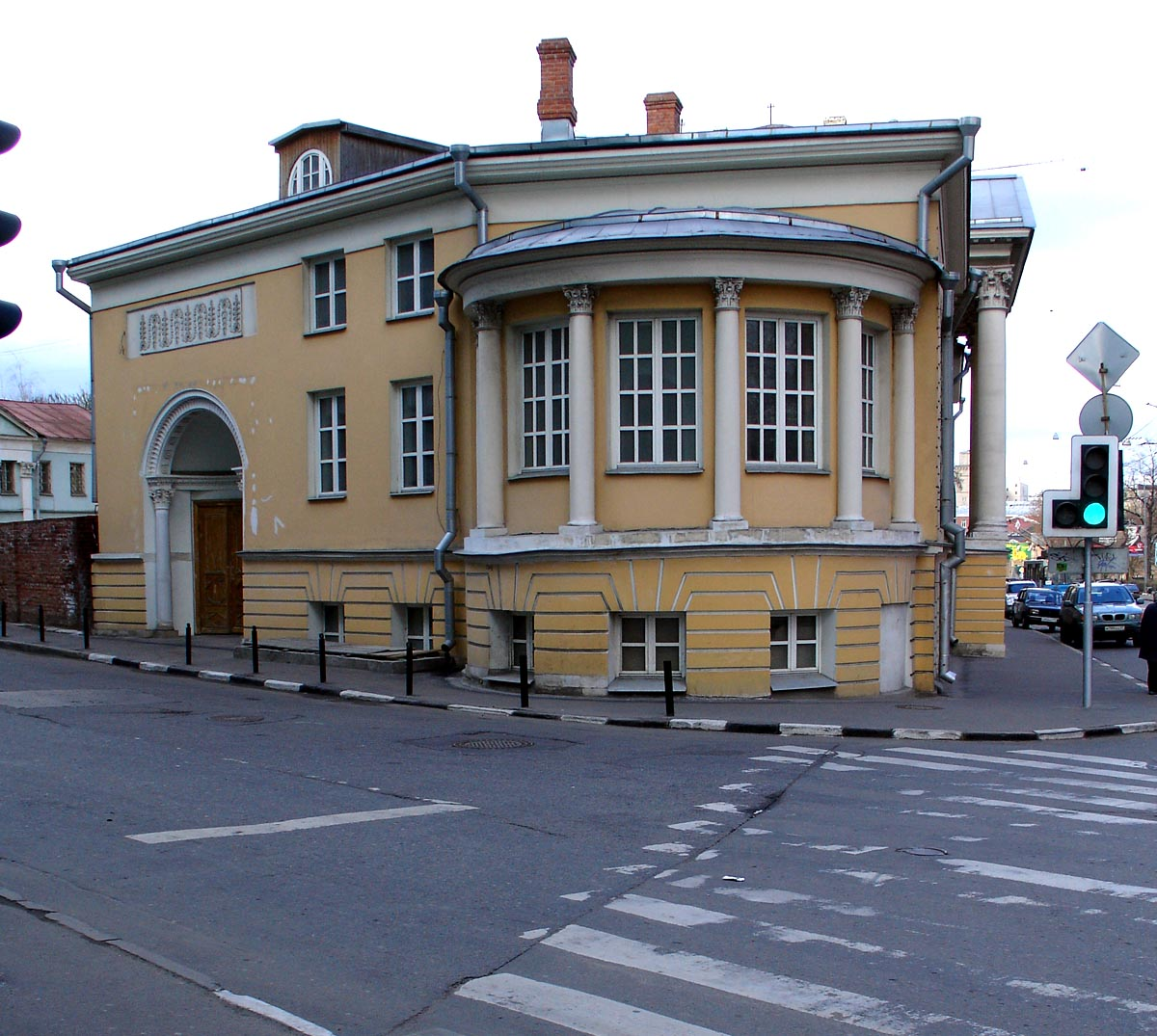
Muravyov-Apostol house

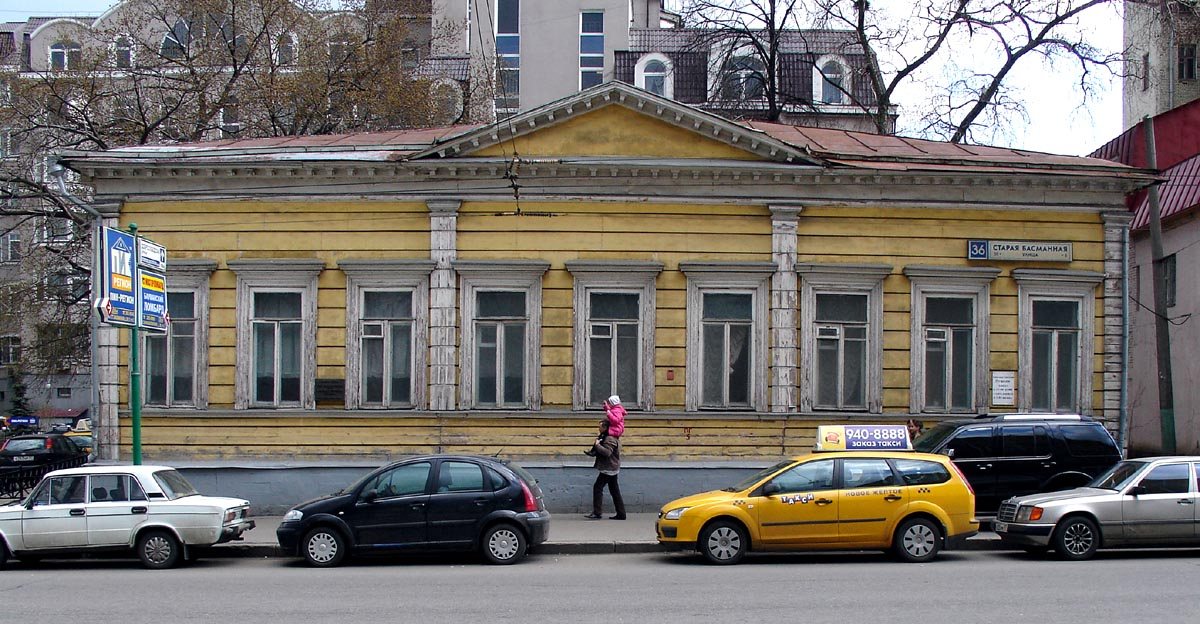
Vasily Pushkin house

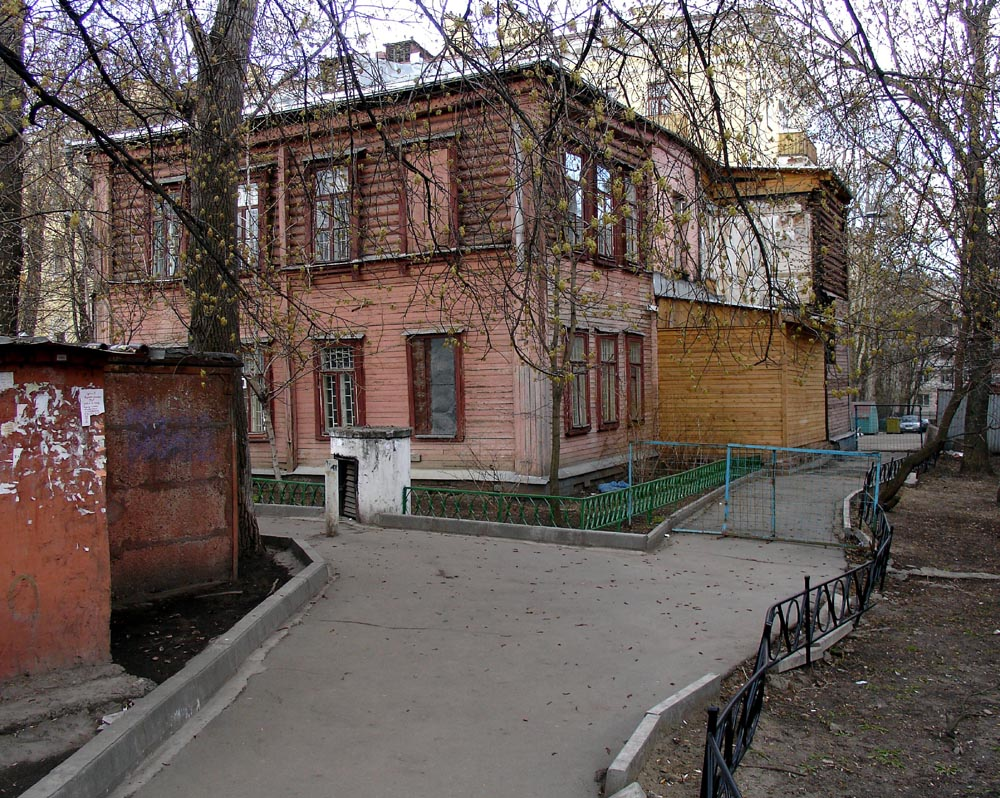
Wooden remains of old Basmannaya Sloboda

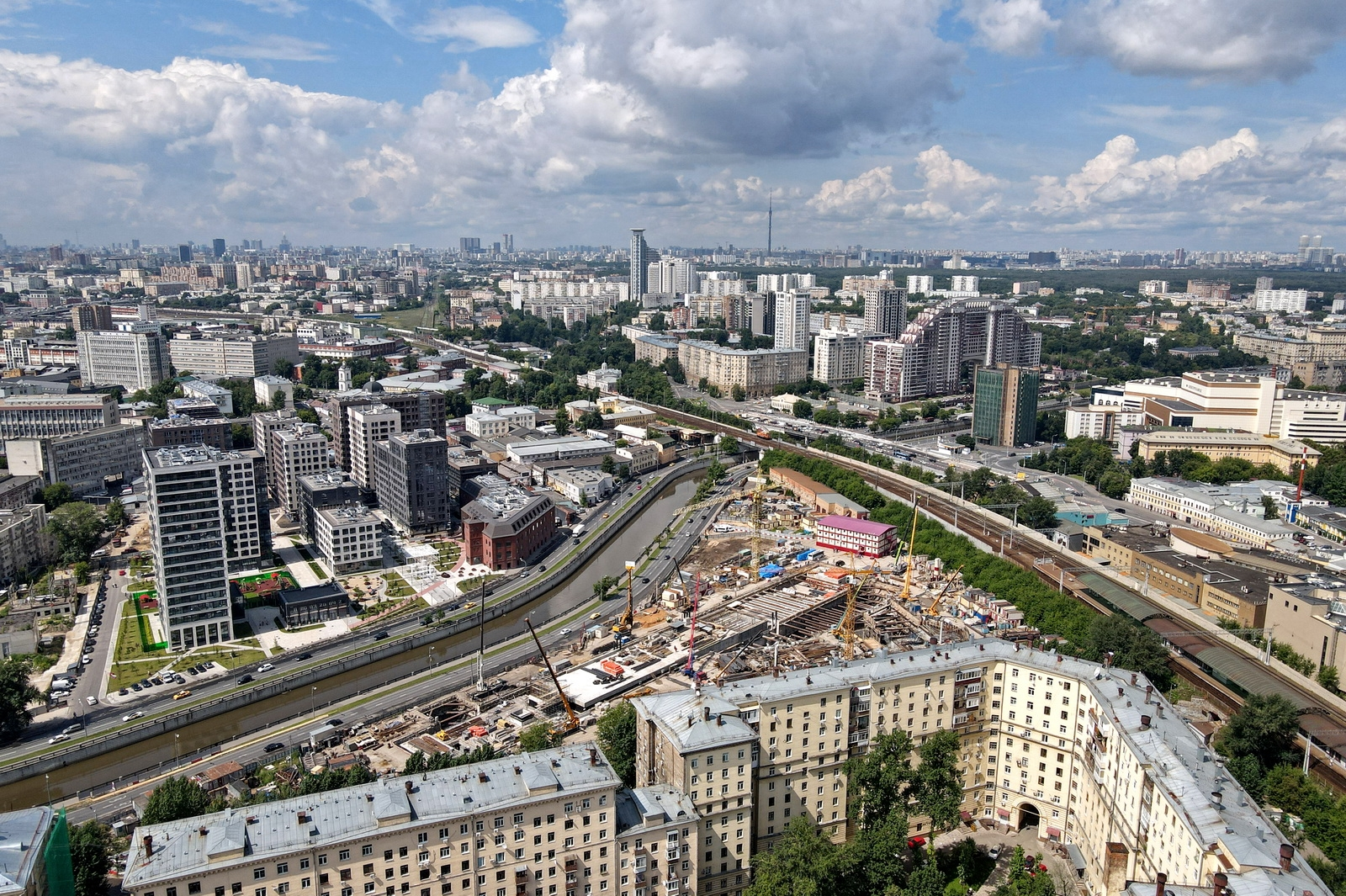
Semyonovskaya and Rubtsovskaya embankments in the area of Elektrozavodskaya station of Moscow Metro.

== See also ==
- Basmanny market roof collapse
- Basmanny District Court
