= Catherine Radziwill =

Polish-Russian aristocrat (1858–1941)

Princess Catherine Radziwiłł
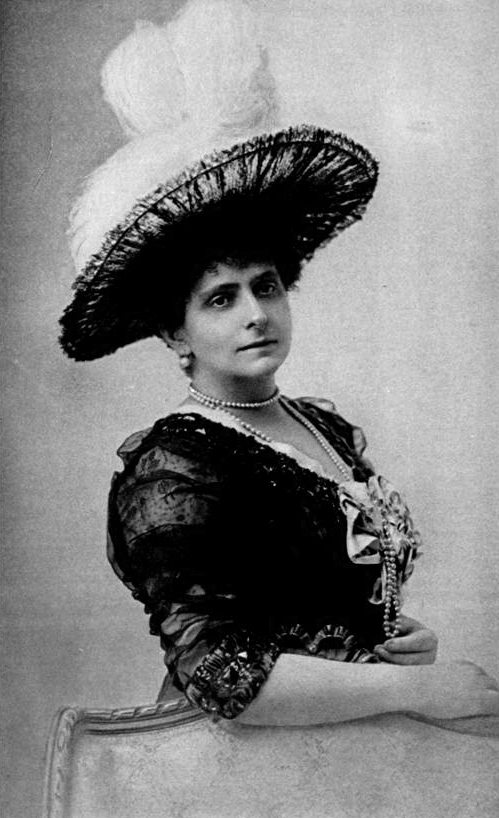
- Full name: Ekaterina Adamovna Rzewuska, Princess Radziwiłł, Mrs. Kolb-Danvin
- Born: 30 March 1858; Saint Petersburg, Russia
- Died: 5 December 1941 (aged 83); New York City, U.S.
- Noble family: Rzewuski
- Spouses: Prince Wilhelm Radziwiłł (m. 1873; div. 1906) Karl Emile Kolb-Danvin (m. 1909, died)
- Issue: Ludwika Ludowika Wiktoria; Ada Jadwiga Felicja; Wanda Ada Jadwiga; Gabrielle Ann; Mikołaj Rafał; Michał Kazimierz
- Father: Adam Adamowicz Rzewuski
- Mother: Anna Dmitrievna Dashkova

Princess Catherine Radziwiłł (Polish: Katarzyna Radziwiłłowa; 30 March 1858 – 12 May 1941) was a Polish-Russian aristocrat. She was a prominent figure at the Imperial courts in Germany and Russia, but became involved in a series of scandals. Combining her literary talents with her love for the luxury of the courts, social life, gossip and intrigue, she wrote two dozen books on European royalty and the Russian court, including Behind the Veil at the Russian Court (1914) and her autobiography It Really Happened (1932).

== Biography ==
Princess Catherine Radziwiłł was born in St. Petersburg as Ekaterina Adamovna Rzewuska, a member of the House of Rzewuski, a Polish family of warriors, statesmen, adventurers and eccentrics. She was the only child of the Russian general Adam Adamowicz Rzewuski (1801–1888), and his second wife, Anna Dmitrievna Dashkova (1831–1858), a daughter of the writer Dmitry Dashkov, Tsar Nicholas I's minister of justice. Catherine's mother, who died while giving birth to her, belonged to some of Russia's most notable families: Dashkov, Stroganov, Pashkov and Vasilchikov. Catherine's father married for a third time and provided her with three half-brothers, including the novelist Stanislaw Rzewuski. The Rzewuski was a literary family, which included Catherine's great-great-grandfather, Wacław Rzewuski and her uncle, Henryk, both writers. Her aunt Karolina kept a literary salon in Paris; her aunt Ewelina was the wife of Honoré de Balzac.

Catherine was educated under the supervision of her stern father in his large estates in central Ukraine, which was then part of Russia. Although the Rzewuski family originated in the Polish–Lithuanian Commonwealth, Catherine had no attachment to Poland and considered herself Russian.

On 26 October 1873, at age 15, she married Prince Wilhelm Radziwiłł (1845–1911), a Polish officer in the Prussian army and son of Prince Wilhelm Radziwiłł (1797–1870) and his wife, Countess Mathilde von Clary und Aldringen (1806–1896). Little is known about Radziwiłł's marriage except what she wrote in her memoirs: Her husband treated her kindly, but she felt bored and frustrated. The couple lived with his family in Berlin and became prominent at the Berlin court, to which he was related through his grandmother Princess Louise of Prussia. They had seven children:

- Anna Elisabeth Maria Mathilde (7 December 1874 – 23 October 1875)
- Louisa Victoria Euphemia Eva Louisa (5 April 1876 – 21 June 1967), married Count Lothar Wilhelm Gebhard Blücher von Wahlstatt.
- Ada Hedwig Felicia Wanda (30 January 1877 – 9 August 1966), married Count Gebhard Leberecht Blücher von Wahlstatt (Louisa's father-in-law).
- Anna Maria Johanna Gabriella (14 March 1878 – 9 January 1968), a nurse, pacifist and women's rights activist.
- Nicholas-Raphael Dmitri Hugo Adam (4 July 1880 – 30 November 1914), married Madeleine Radziwill, a widow 19 years his senior.
- Alfred (5 May 1882 – 1 May 1883)
- Michael-Casimir Dmitri Wilhelm Aloysius (21 January 1888 – 1 March 1903)

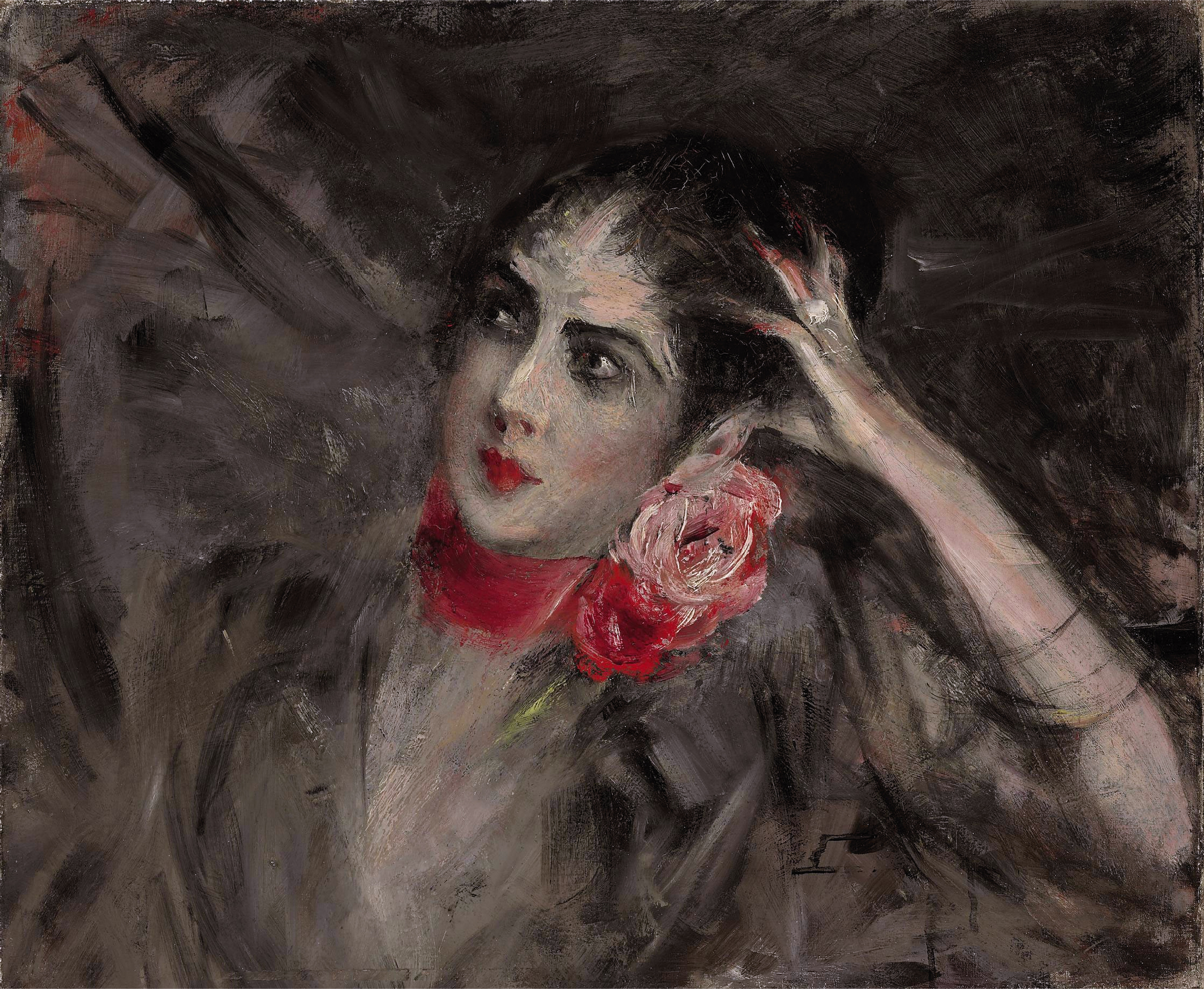
Princess Catherine Radziwiłł with a red ribbon around her neck, by Giovanni Boldini

In 1884, Nouvelle Revue published a series of articles written as letters to a young diplomat by the elderly Count Paul Vasili. The articles were critical of Berlin society and full of damaging gossip about the Imperial Court. The publication of the articles, collected in the book Berlin Society, created a great scandal. Count Paul Vasili was a fictional character and investigation indicated that Auguste Gérard, French reader to the Empress Augusta, was the author. Only in her 1918 book Confessions of the Czarina did Radziwiłł admit that she was the author of Berlin Society. The confusion was aggravated as other anonymous writers also began to use the pen-name Count Paul Vasili.

After the publication of Berlin Society, Radziwiłł was seen with suspicion in Berlin. In 1886, her husband sent their daughters to live with an aunt and the marriage was over. She moved to St. Petersburg and achieved a prominent position at the Russian court. Her political leanings, which were very liberal in Berlin, turned to staunchly conservative in Russia. She became a friend and of the statesman Konstantin Pobedonostsev, and one of Tsar Alexander's few trusted friends. She also began an affair with General Peter Alexander Cherevin, court commandant and head of the Third Section of the Okhrana. During the late 1880s and early 1890s, she was at the pinnacle of her influence at the court, but with the deaths of both the Tsar and Cherevin in 1894, her situation suffered a sharp downturn. Estranged from her husband and children, she moved to London and earned money writing articles chronicling British society for American magazines and newspapers.

=== The Rhodes affair ===
At a London dinner party in 1896, Radziwiłł met Cecil Rhodes, who was then the Prime Minister of the Cape Colony and one of the most prominent men in the British Empire. Radziwiłł decided to go to South Africa; either by coincidence or design, the two sailed back to South Africa on the same ship. Rhodes, who had no interest in women, invited her to dine at his estate, Groote Schuur, but Radziwiłł persistently attempted to attach herself to him and he eventually had to ignore her.

Beginning in July 1900, Radziwiłł had an affair with an associate of Rhodes, Harry Hindle, who was a sub-contractor on the construction of the Cape Town City Hall. Radziwiłł became pregnant and the affair ended the following December; the child, Alexi, was born in July 1901. Radziwiłł, who was living in a small home at Kalk Bay, was in dire financial straits and began forging Rhodes' signature on promissory notes. These were presented to banks and money-lenders and were for very large sums: £4500, £2000, £6300 etc. In September 1901, she was arrested and charged with 24 counts of fraud. The attorney-general Thomas Graham stated that, to avoid prosecution, she also tried to blackmail both Rhodes and the British High Commissioner to South Africa, Lord Milner. (Hindle had not acknowledged the baby and Alexi was sent to the United States.) Rhodes, who was in England and was already gravely ill with heart disease, had to travel back to Cape Town to give evidence at her trial; the ordeal was widely accepted as accelerating his death in March 1902. In April 1902, Radziwiłł was convicted and sentenced to two years at the Roeland Street Prison; she served 16 months and was released in August 1903. She returned to London and, in November 1903, sued the Rhodes' Trustees for £1,400,000., claiming that Rhodes had employed her as a political agent, and that he was the father of her baby. As there was no evidence to support either claim, she withdrew the suit before it went to trial.

In 1904 her memoir, My Recollections was published in London and New York with some success. Her youngest son, Casimir, had died while she was in prison and her estranged husband finally divorced her in 1906. In 1909, she married Karl Emil Kolb-Danvin, a Swedish engineer and entrepreneur. The couple settled in St. Peterburg, where her son Nicholas was serving in the Russian army. She published two more books, Behind the Veil of the Russian court, under her pen name Paul Vasili, and Memoirs of Forty Years (1914), a second autobiographical book. In November 1914, Nicholas was killed on the Eastern Front. Radziwiłł and her husband moved to Stockholm, where she was living at the outbreak of the Russian Revolution. In a four-year span, she published a dozen books. She was on a visit to the United States when Kolb-Danvin died, and she decided to stay in America.

=== The Protocols of the Elders of Zion ===
She settled in New York City where she spent the rest of her life. Radziwiłł played a minor role in exposing The Protocols of the Elders of Zion hoax, but not before being accused in 1919 by lawyer Samuel William Jacobs of claiming that Jews were behind the revolution during a speaking tour of Western Canada. In 1921, she gave a private lecture in New York in which she claimed that the Protocols were compiled in 1904–1905 by Russian journalists Matvei Golovinski and Manasevich-Manuilov at the direction of Pyotr Rachkovsky, chief of the Okhrana, the Russian secret service in Paris. Golovinski worked with Charles Joly (son of Maurice Joly) at Le Figaro in Paris. This account, however, contradicts the basic chronology of the Protocols publication as they were published in 1903 in the Znamya newspaper. Moreover, in 1902, Rachkovsky was dismissed from the Parisian Okhrana and returned to St. Petersburg. Radziwiłł's statements were cited during the Berne Trial by Russian witnesses in 1934 and by experts in 1935; they gave evidence that her date of 1905, when Matvei Golovinski would have shown her a manuscript of The Protocols of the Elders of Zion is obviously an error of chronology, possibly caused by a typo in her article published in The American Hebrew and reprinted by The New York Times. Research by historian Michael Hagermeister casts serious doubts on the Paris origins of the Protocols, and of the truth in Radziwill's Berne testimony, noting her history of fraud and self-serving deception.

Radziwiłł spent the rest of her life writing and, at one point, selling stocks and bonds. After falling and breaking her hip, she died of a heart attack on 12 May, 1941, at the age of 83.

== Works ==
- La Société de Berlin: augmenté de lettres inédites, 1884, as Paul Vasili
- La Société de Saint-Pétersbourg: augmenté de lettres inédites, 1886, as Paul Vasili
- La Sainte Russie; la cour, l’armée, le clergé, la bourgeoisie et le peuple, 1890, as Paul Vasili
- The Resurrection of Peter. A Reply to Olive Schreiner, 1900. (In response to Schreiner’s book Trooper Peter Halkett of Mashonaland)
- My Recollections, 1904
- Behind the Veil at the Russian Court, 1914
- The Royal Marriage Market of Europe, 1915
- The Austrian Court From Within, 1916
- Sovereigns and Statesmen of Europe, 1916
- Because it was Written, 1916 [fiction]
- The Black Dwarf of Vienna, and other weird stories, 1916
- Germany under Three Emperors, 1917
- Russia's Decline and Fall: The Secret History of a Great Debacle, 1918
- Rasputin and the Russian Revolution, 1918
- Cecil Rhodes, Man and Empire-Maker, 1918
- Confessions of the Czarina, 1918
- The Firebrand of Bolshevism; The True Story of the Bolsheviki and the Forces That Directed Them, 1919
- Secrets of Dethroned Royalty, 1920
- Those I Remember, 1924
- The Intimate Life of the Last Tsarina, 1929
- Child of Pity: The Little Prince [the Tsarevitch] Rides Away, 1930
- Nicholas II: The Last of the Tsars, 1931
- The Taint of the Romanovs, 1931
- It Really Happened; An Autobiography by Princess Catherine Radziwiłł, 1932
- The Empress Frederick, 1934
