= Vladimir Gilyarovsky =

Russian journalist and writer (1855–1935)

Vladimir Alekseyevich Gilyarovsky
- Владимир Алексеевич Гиляровский
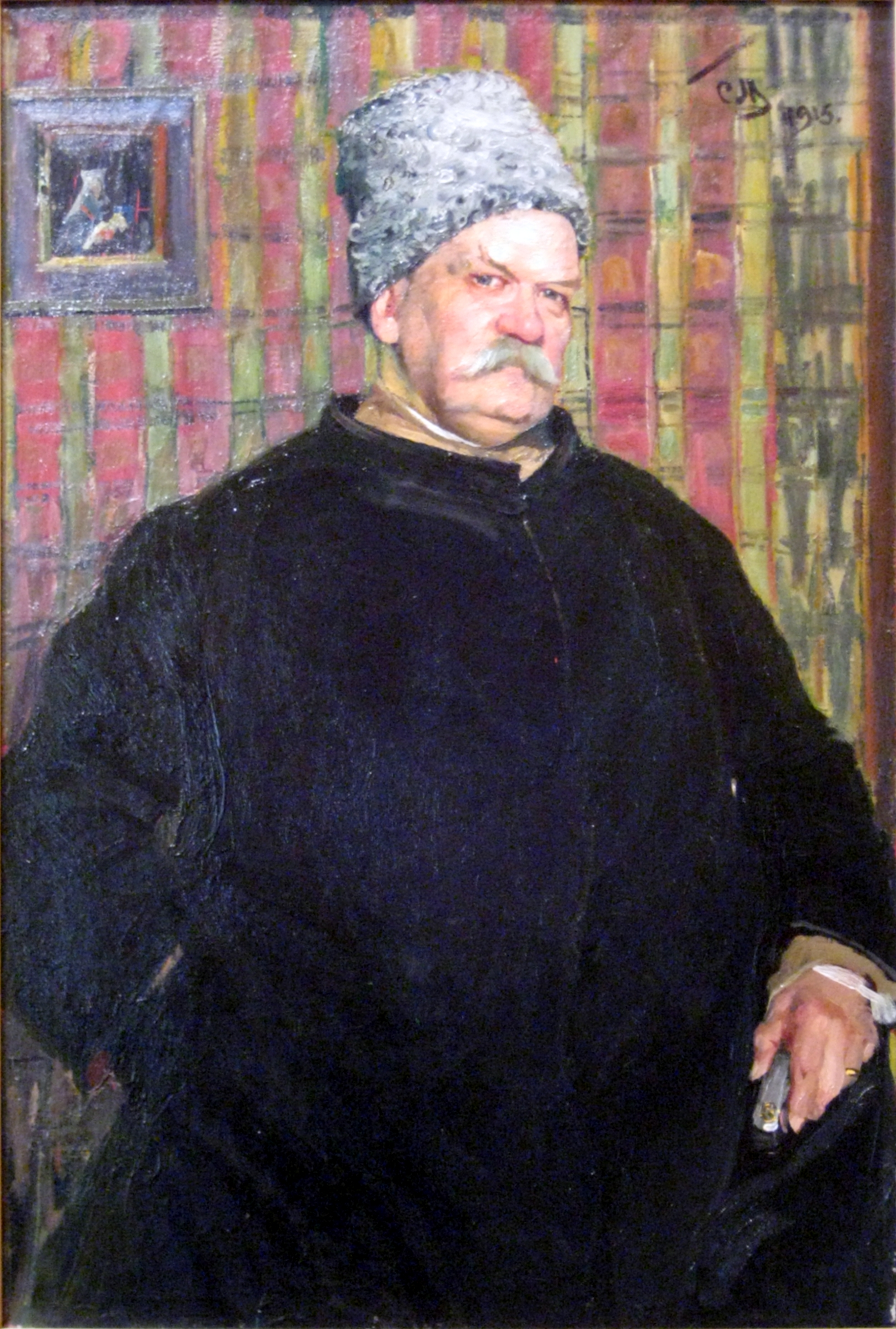
- Born: 26 November 1853; Vologda
- Died: 1 October 1935 (aged 81); Moscow
- Writing career
- Language: Russian

Signature
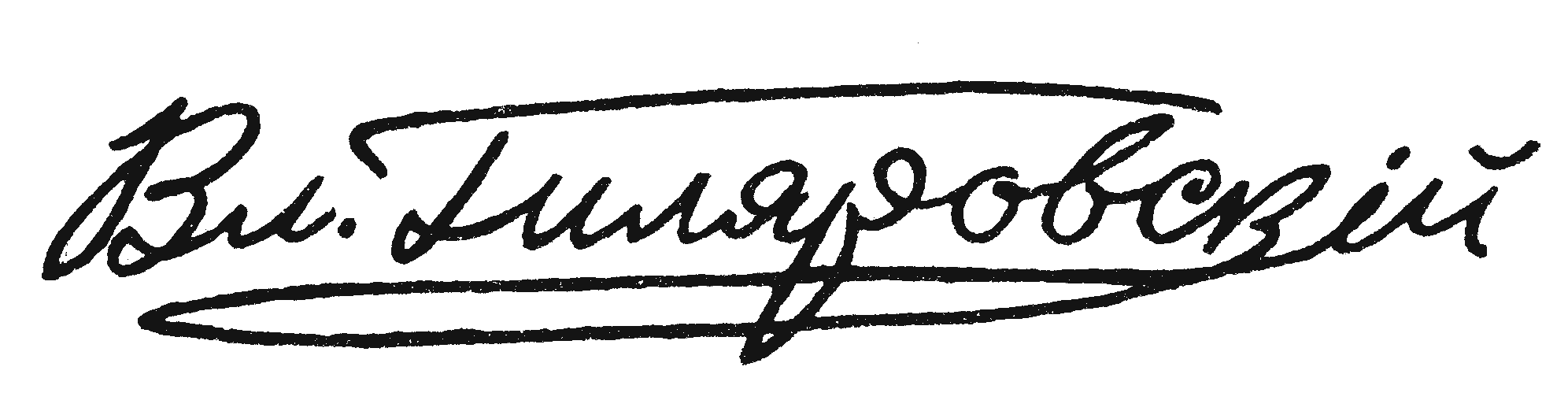

Vladimir Alekseyevich Gilyarovsky (Russian: Влади́мир Алексе́евич Гиляро́вский; 26 November 1853 – 1 October 1935), was a Russian writer and newspaper journalist, best known for his reminiscences of life in pre-Revolutionary Moscow (Moscow and Muscovites), which he first published in a book form in 1926.

== Biography ==
He was born on 26 November 1855 (according to church records, 1853 according to his own writings) on a manor near Vologda where his father, a Novgorodian, worked as an assistant to the manor's bailiff, a Zaporozhian Cossack whose daughter he later married. Gilyarovsky treasured his partly Cossack descent: as a young man, he allegedly posed for one of the Cossacks depicted on Ilya Repin's huge canvas Reply of the Zaporozhian Cossacks; he was also a model for Taras Bulba, whose figure is part of the Gogol Monument in Moscow. Repin was a lifelong friend, with whom Gilyarovsky often corresponded in Ukrainian.

Raised by his well-educated mother (who died when he was 8) and his aristocratic stepmother, he left home early and, after a series of odd jobs (which included stints at a toxic lead paint factory in Yaroslavl, as a tutor and as a barge hauler), he enlisted as a volunteer during the 1877–78 Russo-Turkish war. After a short career as a provincial actor, he established himself as a journalist, winning praise and notoriety as one of the best crime reporters in Moscow. His first book, The Stories of the Slums (1887) recorded his experiences with the Moscow underworld, the Moscow of poverty and crime, finding its epitome in the area of Khitrovka.

After the revolution he dedicated himself to writing memoirs. Among those were My Travels (1928) and Newspaper Moscow (published posthumously), which recorded his reminiscences of the newspaper business of pre-revolutionary Moscow and of some famous people he'd worked with (such as Anton Chekhov), and Theatre People (also published posthumously). He died in Moscow on 1 October 1935.

== See also ==
- Fragments Magazine
