= Khitrovka =

Square in central Moscow

Coordinates: 55°45′9″N 37°38′34″E

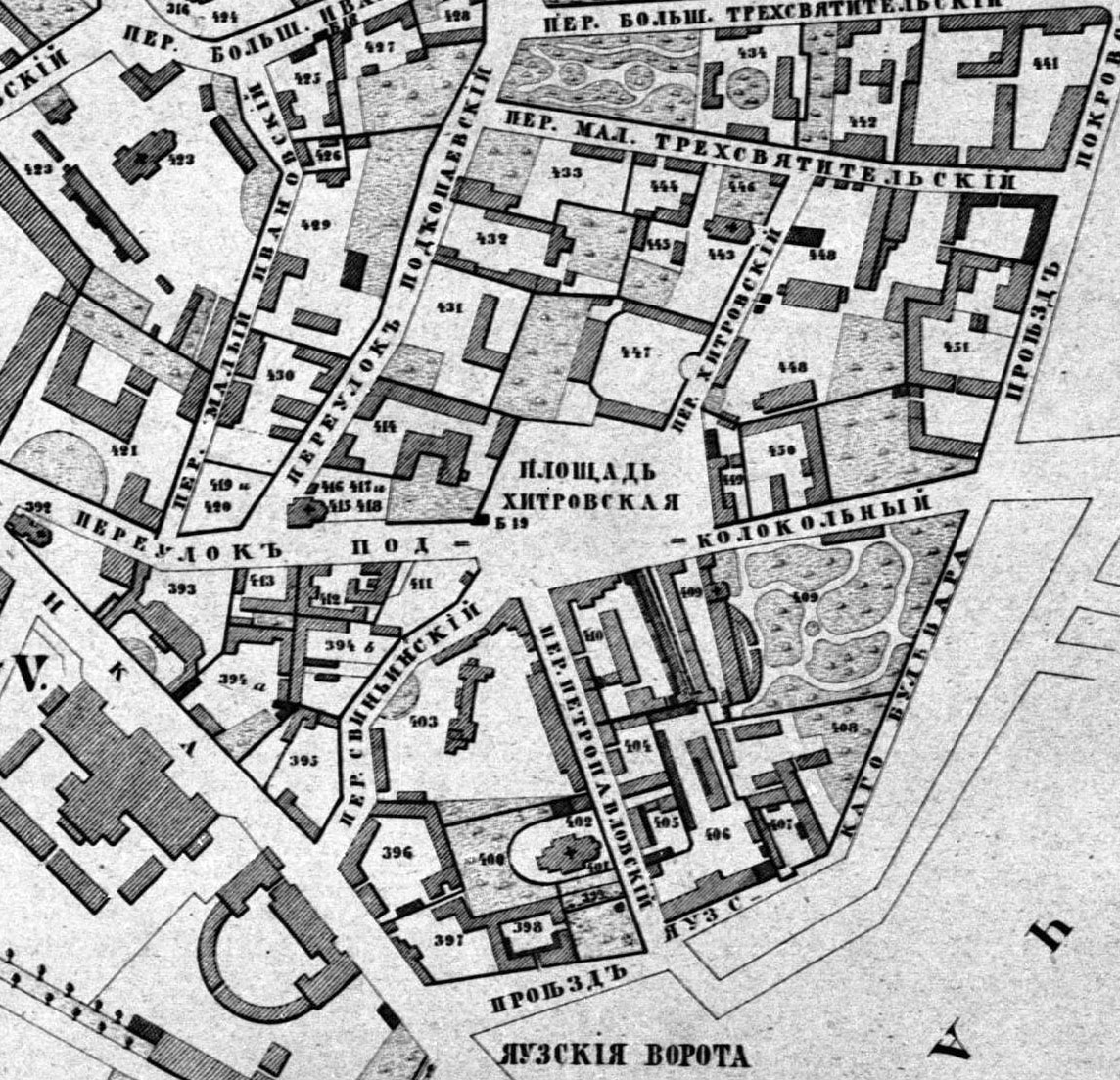
Khitrov market, 1853

Khitrovskaya Square (Russian: Хитровская площадь), also known historically as Khitrov marketplace (Russian: Хитров рынок) or simply Khitrovka (Russian: Хитровка), is a square in the centre of Moscow that existed from the 1820s to 1930s and was restored in the 2010s. In the second half of the 19th century Khitrovka became a bawdy place of Moscow, a den for thousands of unemployed and criminals. It is described by V.A. Gilyarovsky, C.S. Stanislavsky and other authors.

== History ==
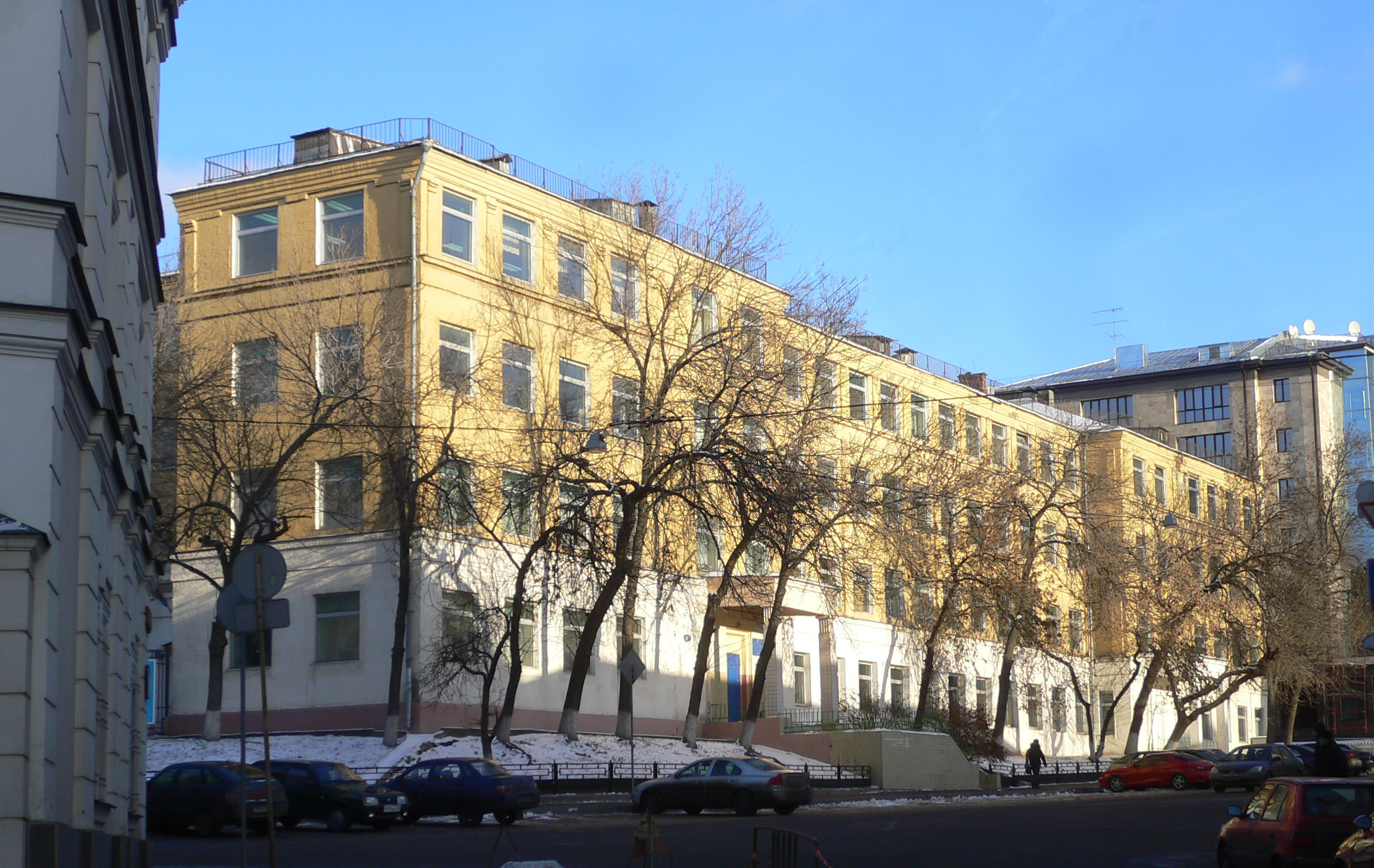
School on the former Khitrov marketplace (demolished in Jan. 2010)

The early buildings of the square were destroyed by the 1812 Moscow fire. In 1823 the empty land was bought by major-general N.Z. Khitrovo who was granted with a permission to erect a meat and greens market there. Khitrovo died in 1826 before he had time to complete this work. The idle market was used each year only for a short period in wintertime, from Christmas to «Myasoyed» (two weeks before the Maslenitsa holiday), when peasants from around Moscow came to sell frozen meat, poultry and venison.

In the 1860s Khitrovka became a job market for unskilled labour, drawing unemployed peasants who were seeking their fortune in the big city. Many of them couldn't find work and settled here forever. The square was a shelter for escaped convicts, broken citizens and other hard up people. Four doss-houses faced the square.

These places were visited repeatedly in late 19th – early 20th century by L.N. Tolstoy, T.L. Schepkina-Kupernik, V.A. Gilyarovsky, C.S. Stanislavsky, V.I. Nemirovich-Danchenko and the artist V.A. Simov who painted decorations for the play «The Lower Depths» by M. Gorky. A.K. Savrasov finished his life in poverty here. The grand duchess Elizaveta Fedorovna, the foundress of Marfo-Mariinsky Convent, established the school in the convent for orphans and children picked up by her at the Khitrov marketplace. The Khitrovka area and its habitués are vividly described in Henri Troyat's "Daily Life in Russia."

All the dens were liquidated in the 1920s. The square was renamed Maxim Gorky square as a tribute to the famous play by Gorky who had visited the site personally. Before World War II a school was built on the square, and the latter ceased to exist, although it was formally mentioned in the registers until the 1960s.

== Current situation ==
In 2008 «DON-stroy», a building company, has designed a project of building-up of the (then former) Khitrovskaya square. According to this plan, an eight-storied office centre shall be erected in place of the electromechanics college located in 11a Podkolokolny sidestreet. These plans of a modern office building of glass and concrete in the very heart of the famous Khitrovka became a reason for arising of a great protest from local grass root organizations, as well as other Moscow citizens. Several collective appeals to the authorities have taken place.

In January 2010 the building of the former college was torn down illegally as a first step towards the construction of a modern business centre in the midst of a theoretically protected historical area. However the construction was stopped by the city authorities, and the square was reorganized by 2014, featuring benches, lanterns and a lawn. Now it is again present in the city's maps as Khitrovskaya Square.

== Sights ==
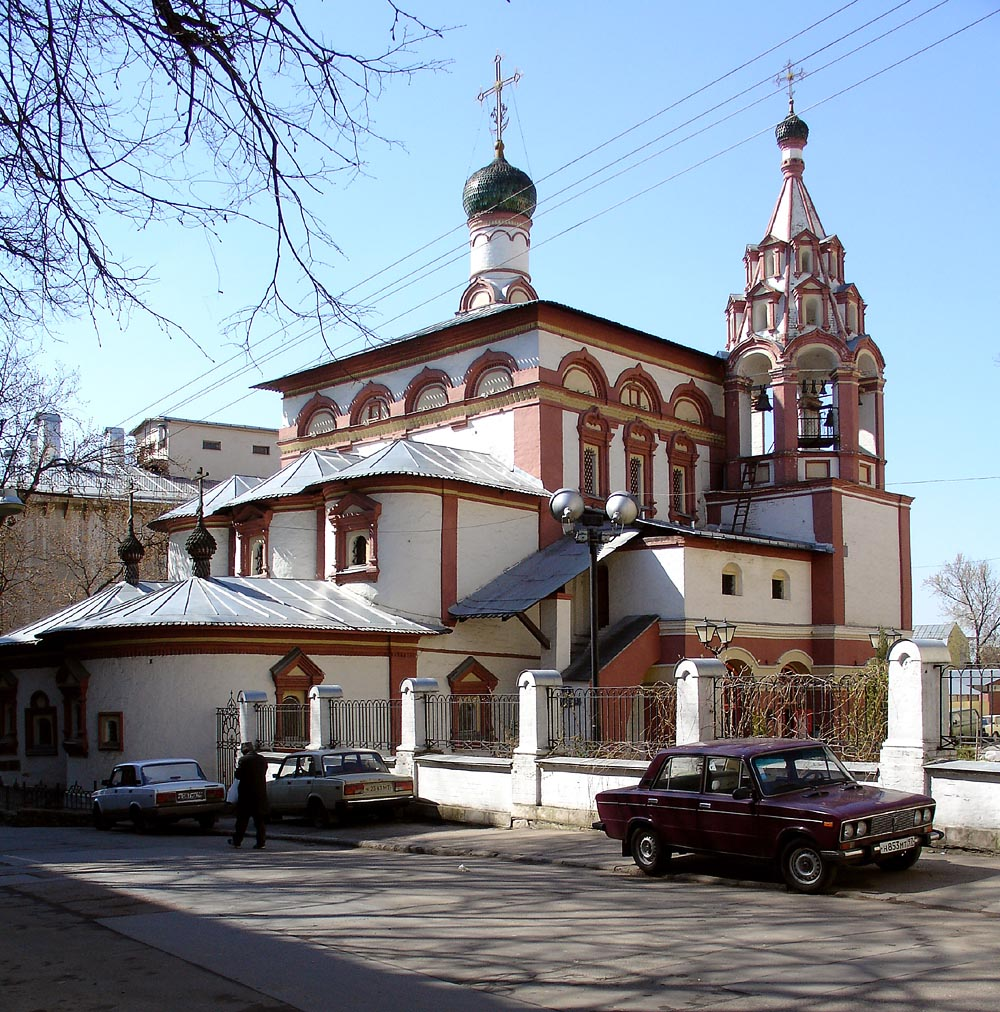
Church of the Three Holy Hierarchs in Kulishki (1670-1674)

Architecture environment of the Khitrov square has an extra high undamaged state. The architecture ensemble of Khitrovka consists of:

- Khitrovo's house (18th century) (16A Podkolokolny sidestreet)
- City manor of Lopukhiny-Kirjakovy (mid. 18th – early 19th century) A.N. Scriabin, the famous Russian composer and pianist, was born here on 25 December 1871 (3/1, building 2 Khitrovsky sidestreet)
- Stolnik Buturlin's mansion (17th century) (11/11/1, 2 building Podkopaevsky sidestreet)
- Former Osterman's manor (18th century) – former Miasnitsky police station (19th century) (2 Chitrovsky sidestreet)

All the three churches surrounding Khitrovka have been preserved:

- Church of St. Peter and St. Paul near Yauza gate (1700, bell tower 1771)
- Church of St. Nicholas the Wonderworker of Podkopai (17th century, bell tower 1750)
- Church of the Three Holy Hierarchs in Kulishki (1670–1674)
