= Adam Rzewuski =

Polish-Russian general (1805–1888)

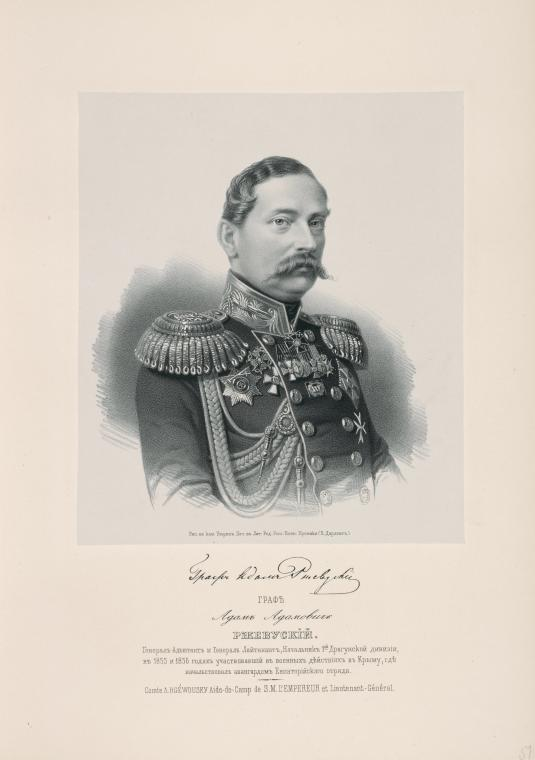
- Born: 1801; Pohrebyshche, Kiev Governorate, Russian Empire
- Died: April 17, 1888 (aged 86–87) Kiev Governorate, Russian Empire
- Allegiance: Russian Empire
- Branch: Imperial Russian Army
- Conflicts: November Uprising; Crimean War

Adam Rzewuski (Russian: Ада́м Ада́мович Ржеву́ский, romanized: Adam Adamovich Rzhevusky; 1801 – April 17, 1888) was a Polish-Russian general. He was born in Pohrebyshche in Kiev Governorate of the Russian Empire (present-day Ukraine). He participated in wars in Poland and the Crimea. He died in Kiev.

He was a son of Adam Wawrzyniec Rzewuski and Justyna née Rdułtowska, his brother was Henryk Rzewuski. He was married three times. In 1829 he married Alexandra Petrovna Lopukhina, daughter of Pyotr Lopukhin. After her death in 1852, he married Anna Dashkov, daughter of Dmitry Dashkov, with whom he had a daughter, Katarzyna. After the death of his second wife, he married Jadwiga Jaczewska in 1860, with whom he had three sons: Stanisław, Adam Witold and Leon. He also had a natural son, Adam.

== Awards ==
- Order of Saint Anna, 3rd class, 1828
- Order of Saint Vladimir, 4th class, 1828
- Gold Sword for Bravery, 1831
- Order of Saint Anna, 2nd class, 1831
- Order of Saint Stanislaus (House of Romanov), 2nd class, 1835
- Order of Saint Vladimir, 3rd class, 1835
- Order of Saint George, 4th degree, 1841
- Order of Saint Stanislaus (House of Romanov), 1st class, 1847
- Order of Saint Anna, 1st class, 1852
- Order of Saint Vladimir, 2nd class, 1859
- Order of the White Eagle (Russian Empire), 1861
- Order of Saint Alexander Nevsky, 1863

Preceded by Illarion Illarionovich Vasilchikov	Commander of the Kiev Military District; November 12–30, 1862	Succeeded by Nicholas Annenkov
