= Arzamas Society =

Russian literary society(1815–1818)

The Arzamas Society (Russian: "Арзамас") was a literary society in Saint Petersburg in 1815–1818. The society received its name after a humorous work by a Russian statesman Dmitry Bludov called A Vision at the Inn at Arzamas, Published by the Society of Scholars ("Видение в арзамасском трактире, изданное обществом учёных людей"). Among the members of this society were Vasily Zhukovsky, Konstantin Batyushkov, Pyotr Vyazemsky, Vasily Pushkin and others. As supporters of the Karamzin reform, the society members argued against conservative ideas of the Lovers of the Russian Word Society and advocated the rapprochement of literary and conversational languages and new genres in poetry.
