= Ivan Dmitriev =

Russian statesman and poet

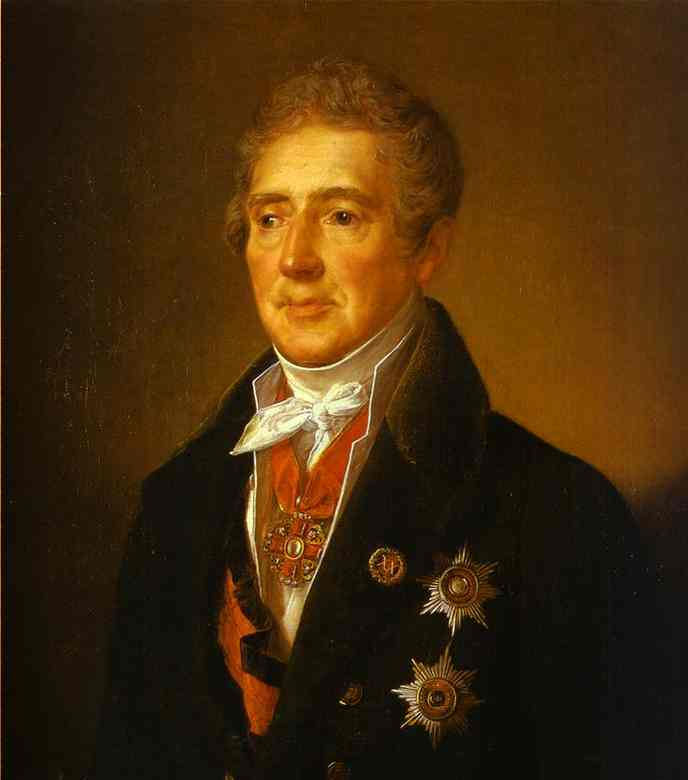
Portrait of I. I. Dmitriyev by Vasily Tropinin. 1835.

Ivan Ivanovich Dmitriev (Russian: Ива́н Ива́нович Дми́триев, IPA: [ɪˈvan ɨˈvanəvʲɪdʑ ˈdmʲitrʲɪjɪf]; 21 September [O.S. 10 September] 1760 – 15 October [O.S. 3 October] 1837) was a Russian statesman. He was also a poet associated with the sentimentalist movement in Russian literature.

Dmitriev was born at his father's estate in the government of Simbirsk. In consequence of the revolt of Yemelyan Pugachev, the family had to flee to Saint Petersburg, and there Ivan was entered at the school of the Semenov Guards, and afterwards obtained a post in the military service. On the accession of Paul I to the imperial throne, he quit the army with the rank of colonel; and his appointment as procurator for the senate was soon after renounced for the position of privy councillor.

During the four years from 1810 to 1814 he served as minister of justice under the Emperor Alexander I; but at the close of this period he retired into private life, and though he lived more than twenty years, he never again took office, but occupied himself with his literary labors and the collection of books and works of art.

In the matter of language he sided with Karamsin, and did good service by his own pen against the Old Slavonic party. His poems include songs, odes, satires, tales, epistles, and others, as well as the fables—partly original and partly translated from La Fontaine, Florian and Arnault—on which his fame chiefly rests. Several of his lyrics have become thoroughly popular from the readiness with which they can be sung; and a short dramatico-epic poem on Yermak, the Cossack conqueror of Siberia, is well known.

His writings occupy three volumes in the first five editions; in the 6th (Saint Petersburg, 1823) there are only two. His memoirs, to which he devoted the last years of his life, were published at Moscow in 1866.

== English translations of his poems ==
Translation of long poem "Liberation of Moscow" (1795) in Four Centuries 16

...And you, our champion, will live for the ages,
As our honor, our glory, and a paragon to all!
There, where the mountains prop up the clouds,
A multitude of sonorous rivers will spring up,
And from the millstone a mighty forest emerge;
Verdant gardens will burgeon upon the plains
And cities will arise and vanish, with time;
An infinity of new marvels nature will create;
Be they revealed to our astonished gaze;
A new light will illuminate the cosmos,
And the warrior, heartened by your blood,
Remembering you, will become in his pride
Greater ingrained, and further, further confirmed
In his unshakable love for our fatherland!

Preceded by Pavel Lopukhin	Minister of Justice; 1810–1814	Succeeded by Dmitry Troschchinsky
