= Vasily Pushkin =

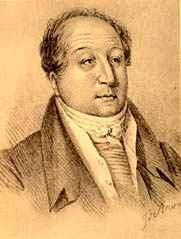
Sketch of Vasily Pushkin

Vasily Lvovich Pushkin (Russian: Васи́лий Льво́вич Пу́шкин; 27 April 1766 – 20 August 1830) was a minor Russian poet best known as an uncle of the much more famous Alexander Pushkin.

Vasily Pushkin was born in Moscow, Russian Empire. During his early years, he served in Russia's Leib Guard Izmailovo Regiment, retiring with the rank of poruchik. Between 1803 and 1804 Pushkin lived abroad, mainly in Paris.

Pushkin was a neoclassical poet and was indifferent to the then-popular romantic movement. In his poem "Captain Khrabrov", Pushkin mocked romanticism. He was a follower of light poetry, and wrote numerous songs, epistles, and epigrams in the manner of Horace, Tibullus, or Catullus. He also translated several poems of La Fontaine and other French poets.

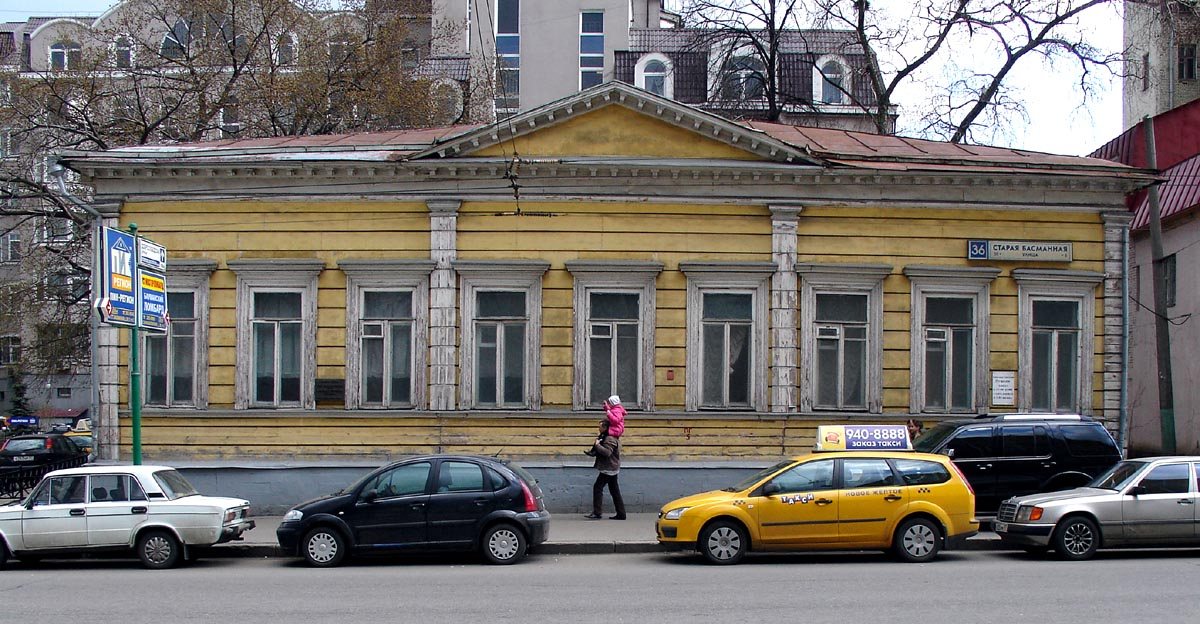
Vasily Pushkin's house in Staraya Basmannaya Street, Moscow

Vasily Lvovich had a sudden burst of creativity in 1810 and 1811, when he wrote his best polemical verse, including a humorous masterpiece, A Dangerous Neighbour (1811), set in a bawdyhouse. Buyanov, the main character of the poem, became a household name; Alexander Pushkin mentioned him in Eugene Onegin. Pushkin the younger did not take his uncle's poetry seriously; at the age of 22 he apprehended that the posterity will ascribe A Dangerous Neighbour to his own juvenilia:

All his works are not worth his Buyanov; and what will happen to him in posterity? I'm extremely afraid that my cousin [i.e., Buyanov] will be taken for my son... [Pushkin's letter to Peter Vyazemsky, 2 January 1822].

Due to interest in his nephew, Vasily Pushkin's works were re-published numerous times; the last and most complete collection is "V. L. Pushkin. Poems", M. Hyperion, 2005. ISBN 5-89332-104-9.
