= Lovers of the Russian Word =

Literary society in Russia, 1811–1816

The Colloquy of Lovers of the Russian Word (Russian: Беседа любителей русского слова, Beseda lyubitelei russkogo slova) was a conservative and proto-Slavophile literary society founded in St. Petersburg in the early nineteenth century.

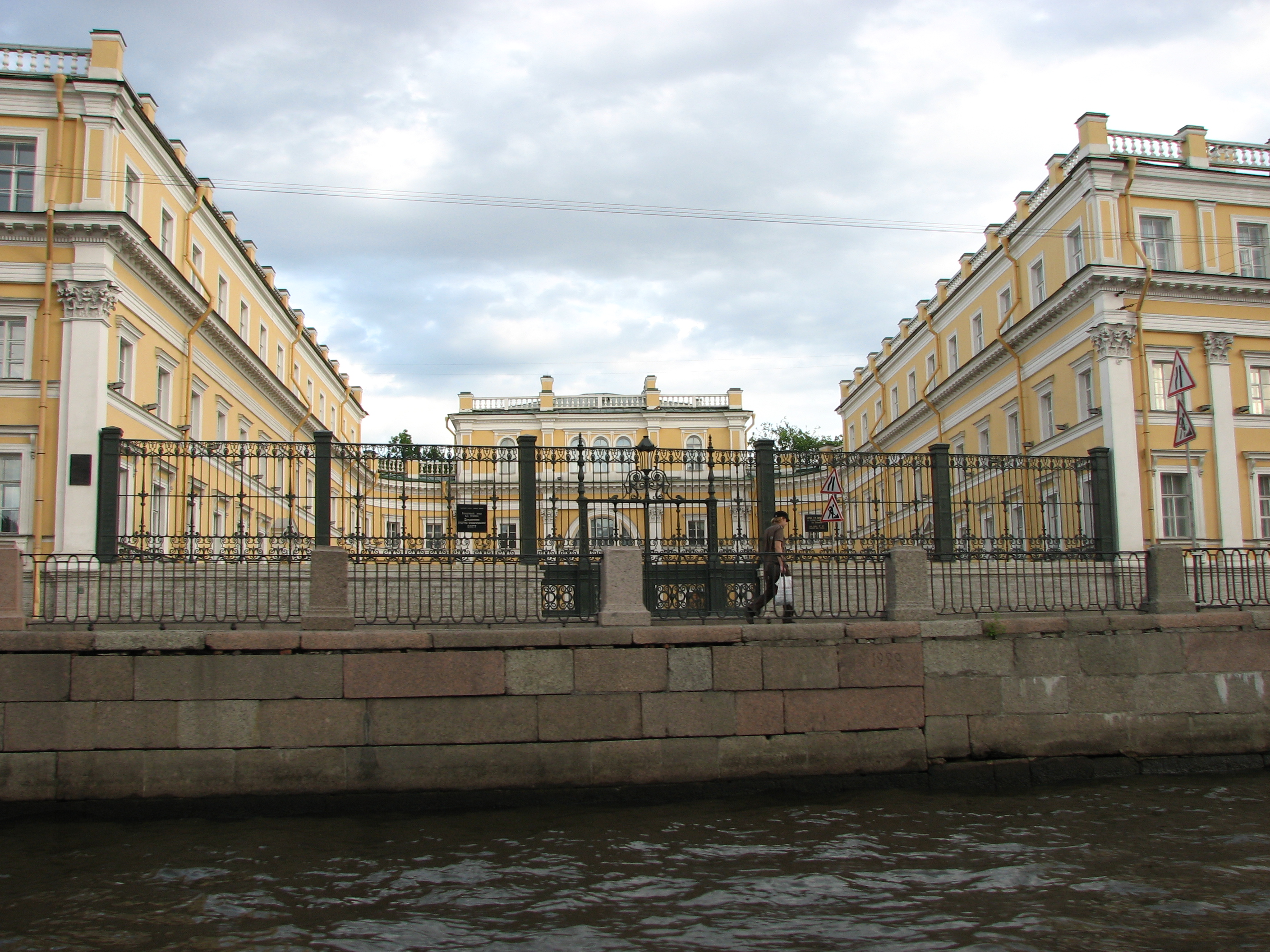
Derzhavin's house in Saint-Petersburg

The society began meeting as early as 1807, but its regular monthly meetings began in March 1811 in "a beautiful and luxuriously appointed hall in Derzhavin's large home on the banks of the Fontanka"; as many as 500 people might attend its meetings, and it published its own journal, the Чтения в Беседе любителей русского слова (Readings at the Colloquy of Lovers of the Russian Word), whose nineteen issues consisted mainly of material presented at the meetings. It was controlled by conservatives like Derzhavin and Alexander Shishkov who opposed the liberal reforms of Alexander I; in literary terms, it sought to ban gallicisms and other foreign infiltrations from the Russian language and looked to Church Slavonic and folk traditions to create an acceptable culture. It was opposed and mocked by the progressive Arzamas Society. It dissolved after Derzhavin's death in 1816, but was revived as a literary and scholarly society at Moscow University from 1858 to 1930; among the writers speaking at its meetings were A. K. Tolstoy, Ivan Turgenev, Afanasy Fet, Fyodor Dostoevsky, Leo Tolstoy, and Ivan Bunin.

== Bibliography ==
- Mark Altshuller, Predtechi slavyanofil'stva v russkoi literature (Obshchestvo "Beseda lyubitelei russkogo slova") [Forerunners of Slavophilism in Russian literature: The society "Colloquy of Lovers of the Russian Word"]. Ann Arbor: Ardis, 1984.
- P. N. Sakulin, "Obshchestvo liubitelei rossiiskoi slovesnosti," Pechat’ i revoliutsiia 7 (1927).
