= Lefortovo Tunnel =

Road tunnel in Moscow, Russia

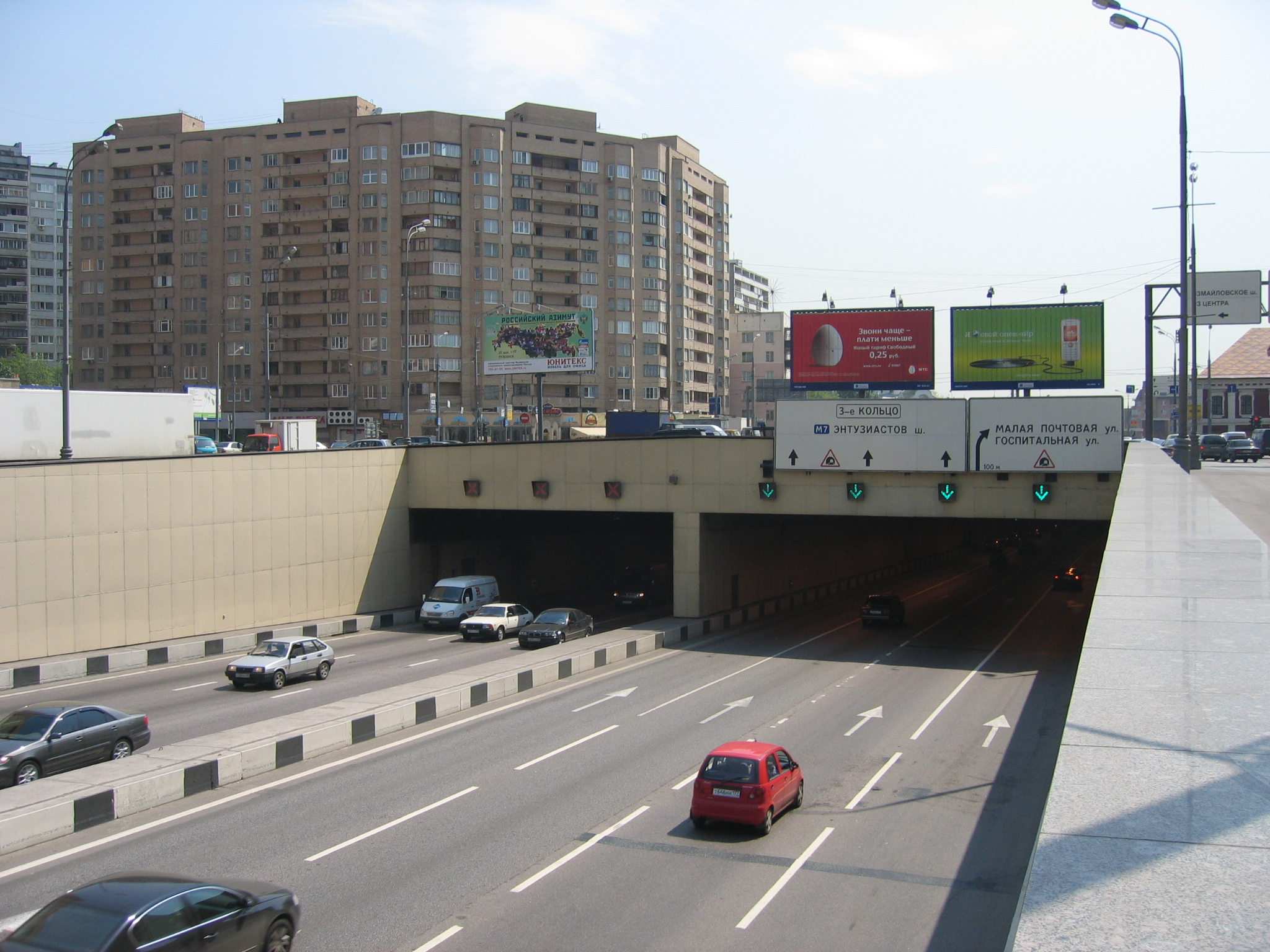
- Entrance to the Lefortovo Tunnel

- Location within Moscow

Overview
- Location: Lefortovo District, Moscow, Russia
- Coordinates: 55.764068°N 37.701645°E
- Route: Third Ring Road

Operation
- Opened: 2003
- Traffic: Automotive

Technical
- Length: 3.2 km (2.0 mi)
- No. of lanes: 7 (3 lanes northbound, 4 lanes southbound)

Lefortovo Tunnel (Russian: Лефо́ртовский тоннель) is a road tunnel in the Lefortovo District in Moscow, Russia, opened in 2003. It carries seven lanes of the Third Ring Road. At 3.2 km (2.0 mi) long, it is the fifth longest urban tunnel of Europe (after the M30 RingRoad tunnels in Madrid at 7.5 km (4.7 mi), Blanka tunnel complex in Prague at 5.5 km (3.4 mi), Södra länken in Stockholm at 4.7 km (2.9 mi), and the Dublin Port Tunnel at 4.5 km (2.8 mi)). The Third Ring Road was originally planned for a surface alignment across the historic district of Lefortovo; however, public outcry from local residents blocked these plans, and the tunnel was built instead.

The tunnel runs under the Yauza (river), and water leaks in at some points. The temperature has reached as low as −38 °C (−36 °F) (as during the winter of 2005), causing the water on the road's surface to freeze.

It has been nicknamed "The Tunnel of Death" (Russian: Тоннель Смерти) owing to its high accident rate and a viral video circulating around the Internet compiling footage of vehicle accidents (many caused by skidding on ice in winter) recorded by monitoring cameras.
