= Third Ring Road (Moscow) =

Beltway around central Moscow, Russia

Third Ring Road Тре́тье Tра́нспортное Kольцо́
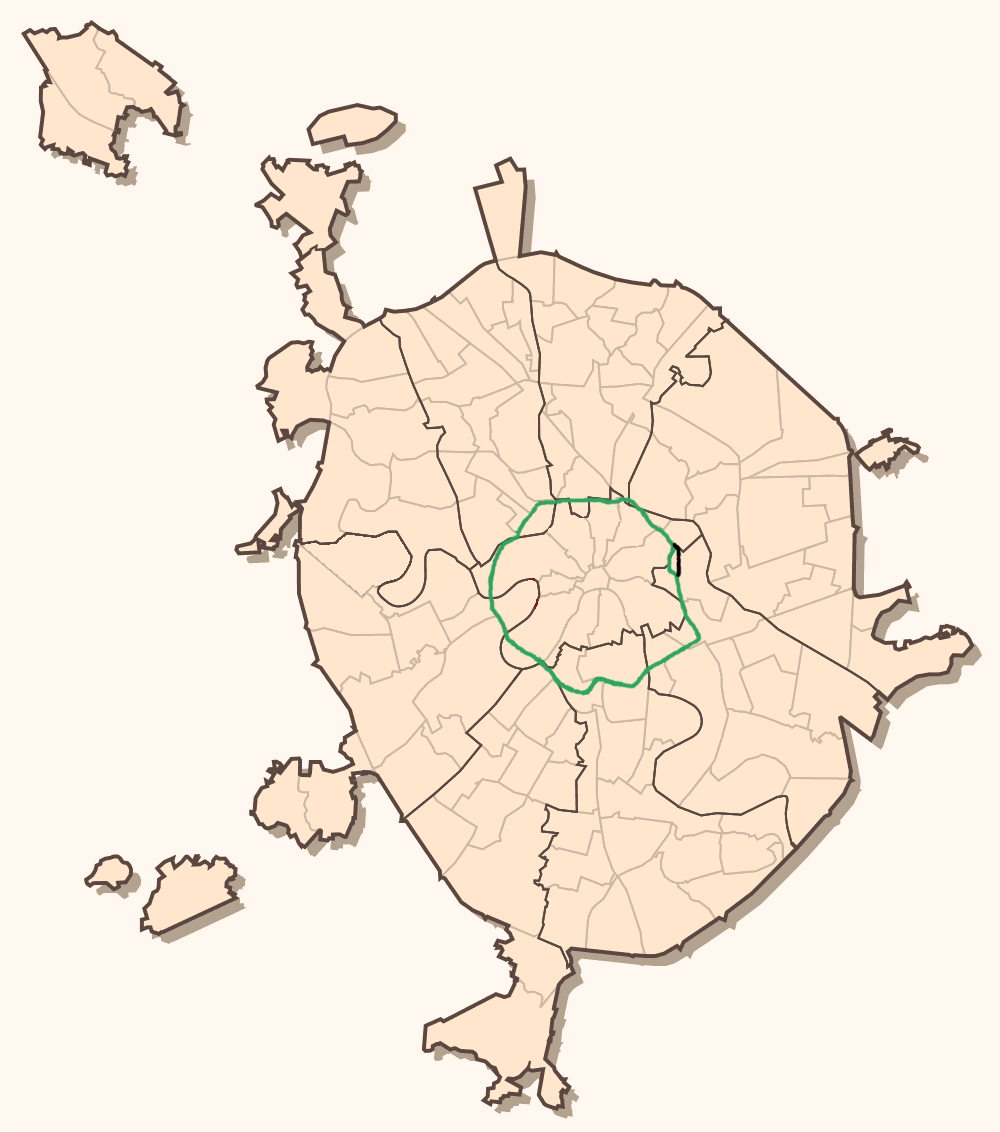
- Third Ring Road (in green) in Moscow

Route information
- Maintained by the city of Moscow
- Length: 35 km (22 mi)
- History: Construction started in 1960 and finished on December 5, 2003.

Major junctions
- Orbital around central Moscow

Location
- Country: Russia
- Major cities: Moscow

Highway system
- Russian Federal Highways

The Third Ring Road or the Third Ring (Russian: Тре́тье тра́нспортное кольцо́, or Тре́тье кольцо́, or ТТК; transliteration: Tretye Transportnoye Koltso, or Tretye Koltso, or TTK) is a beltway around central Moscow, Russia, located between the Garden Ring in the city centre and the Moscow Ring Road (MKAD).

== Route ==
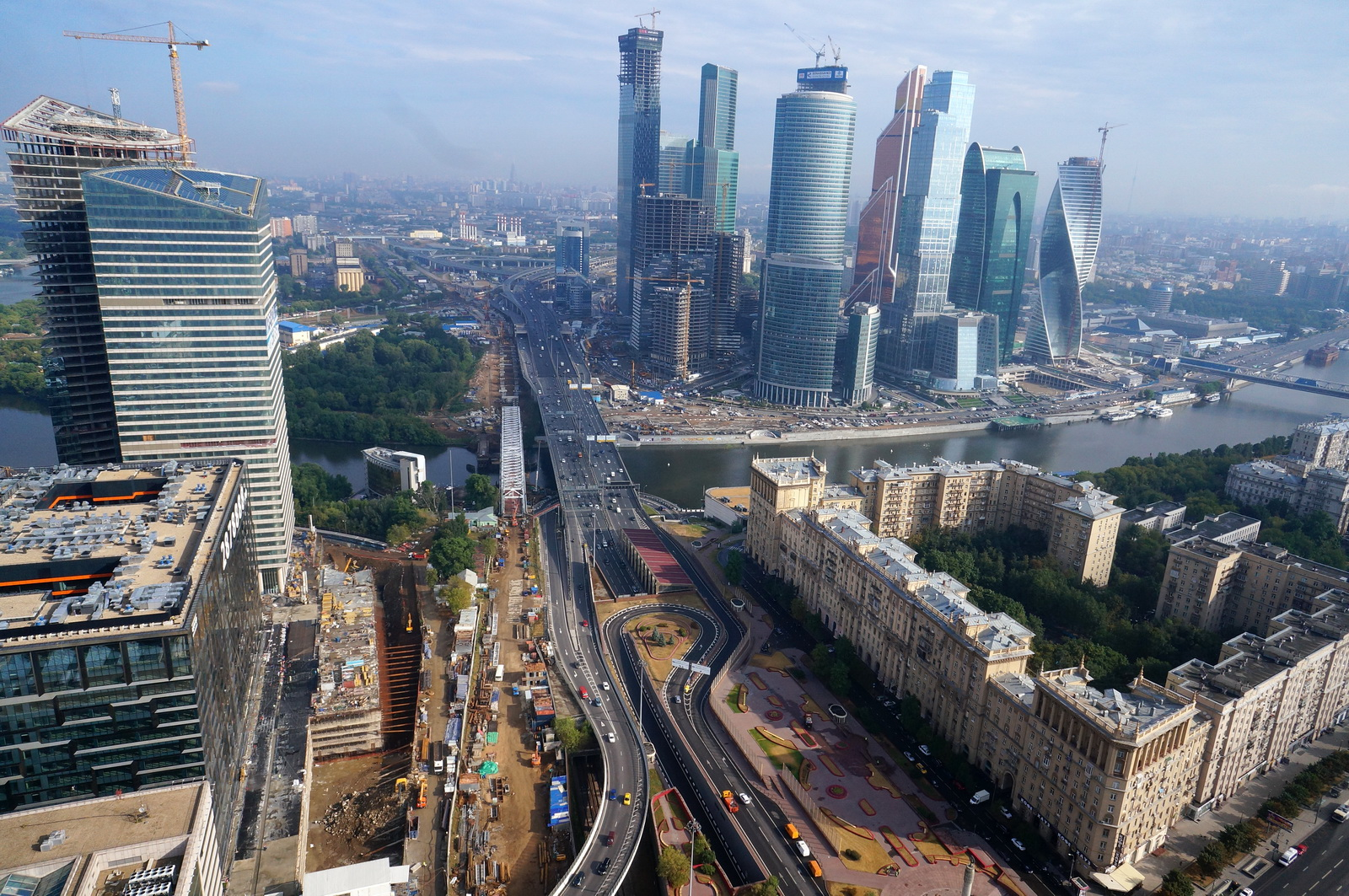
The Third Ring Road near the Moscow International Business Center

The Third Ring is 35 kilometers (km) in length, i. e. about 10 km in diameter. Lanes varies from three to five. As one of Moscow's main roads, the Third Ring Road suffers from heavy traffic congestion. There is a planned Fourth Ring between the Moscow Ring Road and the Third Ring. The Third Ring can be used to get from areas such as Sokolniki Park to Sparrow Hills, on the other side of the city. The road is used by many Moscovites who live in the suburbs of Moscow to bypass the city centre. The Third Ring Road was completed in 2004 with the Lefortovo Tunnel, the fifth longest urban tunnel in Europe (after the M30 RingRoad tunnels in Madrid at 7.5 km (4.7 mi), Blanka tunnel complex in Prague at 5.5 km (3.4 mi), Södra länken in Stockholm at 4.7 km (2.9 mi), and the Dublin Port Tunnel at 4.5 km (2.8 mi)). The Third Ring Road also serves as the main highway access for the Moscow International Business Center (MIBC), a modern high-rise office district located along the western portion of the Third Ring, where it crosses the Moskva River.

=== Limited-access highway ===
The limited-access highway sections of the Third Ring Road are located on the northern sections of the beltway. The northern sections can be identified as this type of highway due to its access to adjacent property and many intersections with streets. The section starts east from the interchange with Begovaya Street in the Begovoy District to the Lefortovo Tunnel in the Basmanny District. The Begovaya Street Interchange is a variation of the Directional T Interchange and the Year 1905 Street terminates at this interchange. There are two intersections with Polikarpova Street and Begovaya Street of which they intersect with the beltway and some ramps of the interchange. The beltway later intersects with Begovaya Lane, Botkinskiy Driveway, and Proyektiruemyy Driveway. The Third Ring Road then underpasses the 12-lane Leningradsky Avenue with a variant diamond interchange that includes a few overpasses. The beltway then intersects Petrovsko Razumovskiy Driveway and overpasses Nizhnyaya Maslovka Street, in which the street served as a ramp, bordering the Savyolovsky District in the north. The beltway then intersects Bashilovskaya Street, Raskovoy Street, Nizhny Maslovskiy Driveway, Vyatskaya Street, and Pravdy Street. The Third Ring Road then interchanges with Butyrskaya Street-Novoslobodskaya Street with a hybrid folded parclo diamond interchange, coming into the Maryina Roshcha District. The beltway later intersects Savelovskiy Driveway, Tikhvinskaya Street, Dvintsev Street, Novosushchevskaya Street, and Vysheslavtsev Lane. The Third Ring Road later underpasses both Sheremetyevo Street-Oktyabrskaya Street with a diamond interchange and intersects Maryinoy Roshschi Street a few meters east. Later, the beltway overpasses Rizhskaya Place, Mira Avenue, Bolshaya Pereyaslavskaya Street several railways near the Riga Railway Station, and Sokolnicheskiy Val Street, thus leading it into the Basmanny District. The Third Ring Road later intersects Rybinskaya Street, underpasses Lobachika Street and Mitkovskaya railway with a tunnel, and overpasses Rusakovskaya Avenue-Krasnoprudnaya Street with a diamond interchange and another railway. The beltway then intersects with Novaya Perevedenovskaya Street and goes into the Lefortovo Tunnel, but not without a folded diamond interchange with Bakuninskaya Street. This ends the limited-access highway section of the Third Ring Road.

=== Controlled-access highway ===
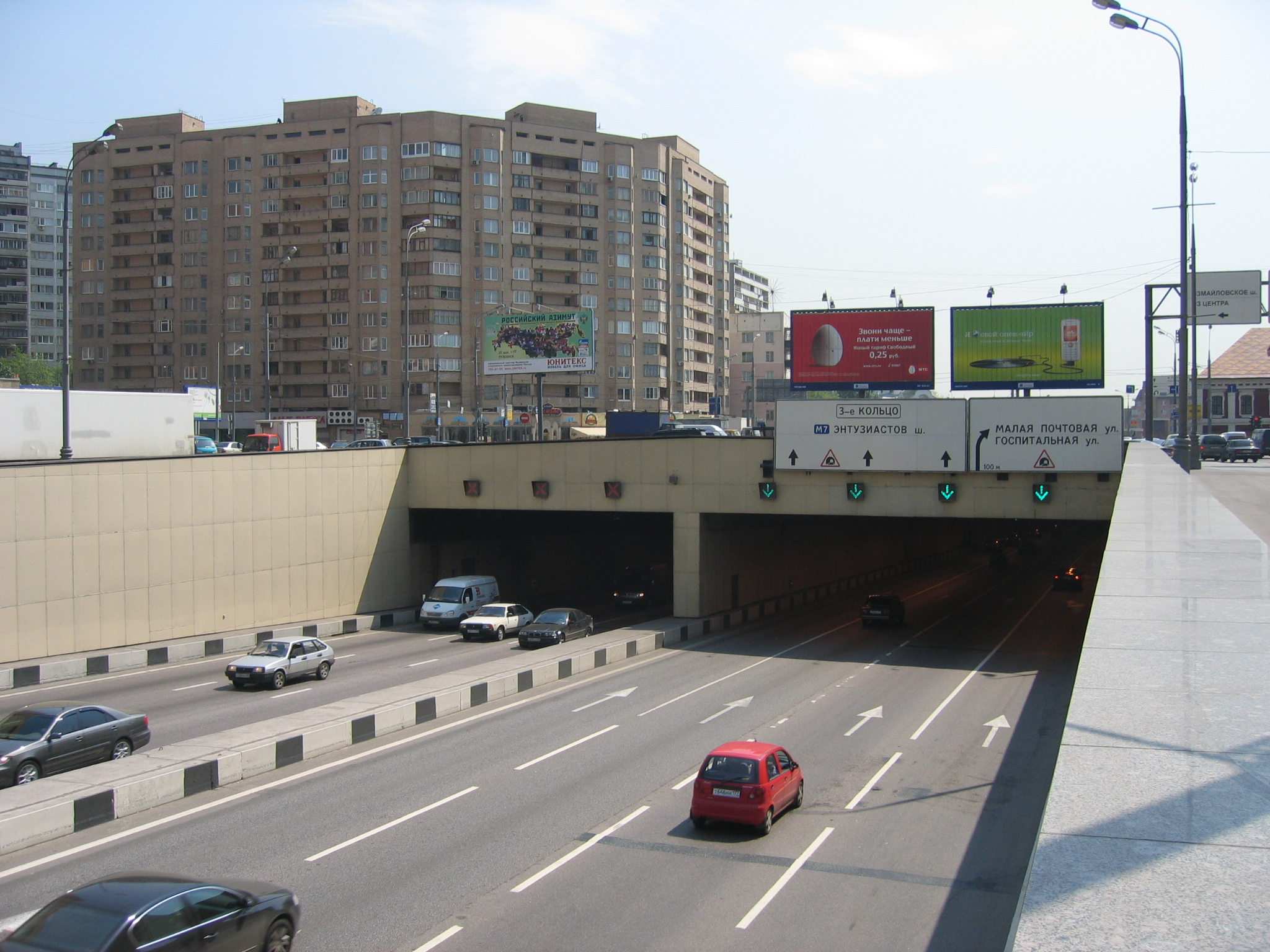
The north exit of Lefortovo Tunnel in the Basmanny District of eastern Moscow. The ring road crosses the Yauza river through the tunnel, which is the fifth longest urban tunnel in Europe.

The controlled-access highway sections of the Third Ring Road are located on the eastern, southern, and western sections of the beltway. These sections can be identified as this type of highway due to its lack of access to adjacent property and no intersections with streets; however, there are some exceptions. The section starts south from the Lefortovo Tunnel in the Lefortovo District to the interchange with Begovaya Street in the Begovoy District. The section starts when the Third Ring Road exits out the Lefortovo Tunnel in the Lefortovo District and forms a cloverleaf-like interchange with Entuziastov Highway, also known as Highway of the Enthusiasts. The beltway then overpasses a railway and forms a hybrid interchange with Nizhegorodskaya Avenue, now bordering the Tagansky District in the west and the Nizhegorodsky District in the east. The Third Ring Road then turns southwest, over passing and under passing a few railroads, and forming a hybrid interchange with Ostapovskiy Thoroughfare and Volgogradskiy Avenue. The beltway then touches southeastern part of the Moscow Central Circle (MCC) line, also known as Line 14, of the Moscow Metro, in the south. Later, the Third Ring Road forms a hybrid interchange with Yuzhnoportovaya Street and the beltway splits to make the MCC line as a median strip. The beltway then underpasses the Velozavodskaya Street, leading to the Danilovsky District. The MCC Line later underpasses the southern lanes of Third Ring Road, thus ending its purpose as a median strip. There is also a ramp on the beltway leading to Trofimova Street. The Third Ring Road then forms an interchange with Avtozavodskaya Street and then intersects with Leninskaya Sloboda Street and the southern portion of Avtozavodskaya Street. The beltway later overpasses the Moskva River on the Avtozavodskii Bridge, leading the beltway to the Donskoy District.

=== List of major intersections ===
- Leningradsky Avenue
- Butyrskaya Street-Novoslobodskaya Street
- Entuziastov Highway/Highway of the Enthusiasts
- Nizhny Novgorod Street
- Volgogradskiy Avenue
- Velodzavodskaya Street
- Varshavskoye Highway
- Leninsky Avenue
- Kutuzovsky Prospekt
- Shmitovsky Thoroughfare
- Zvenigorod Highway

== History ==
=== Soviet era (1935–1993) ===
In 1935, the Third Ring Road had been planned in the Master Plan of Moscow, designated as the reconstruction of a "new Boulevard Ring using mostly runs Collegiate Chamber of Val". Around the year 1960, construction of the beltway started on Begovaya Street to Riga. Construction of the beltway started eastward at the northern sections. In 1961, a tunnel under Leningradsky Avenue was completed and put into effect. In the same year, the Avtozavodskii Bridge was constructed. In 1965, the overpass near the Savelovskaya Railroad Station was completed. The overpass includes the beltway going over a railway and Butyrskaya Street-Novoslobodskaya Street. In 1975, the overpass near the Riga Railway Station was built. This overpass would go over Mira Avenue and another railway. In 1984, the overpass over Rusakovskaya Avenue was constructed and put into effect. A tunnel under Mitkovskaya Railway was completed connecting the northern branch and the northeastern branch of the road. Now the Third Ring Road was over one-fourths completed, with the western, eastern, and southern branches needed to be built. However, economic hardships during the time halted the construction of the beltway, and no progress was made for about over a decade.

=== Contemporary era (1993–present) ===
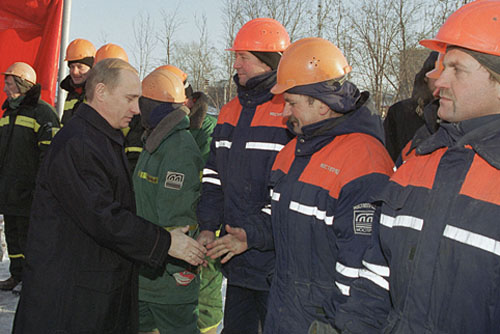
Russian president Vladimir Putin at the opening of a new section of the Third Ring Road on December 12, 2001

After the early 1990s when the Soviet Union and the RSFSR dissolved, construction of the beltway continued, starting in the southwestern sections of the beltway, with the general contractor behind it being the Transstroy Corporation. On October 28, 1998, the Berezhkovskii Bridge was constructed and opened. The bridge is located over the Moskva River between the Dorogomilovo District and the Khamovniki District. On May 10, 1999, the overpass over the Luzhnetskaya Thoroughfare from Komsomolsk Avenue to Berezhkovsky Bridge was built and opened. Plans to create a new Riga overpass to replace the old one were approved and construction started. The first phase of the new overpass was finished on August 31 while the second phase finished on December 4. Seven days later, the section from the Berezhkovskii Bridge to the Kutuzovsky Avenue was completed, with a tunnel interchange going under the avenue. In the fall of the year 2000, the section between Komsomolsk Avenue in the Khamovniki District to Leninsky Avenue in the Donskoy District was completed and opened, with St. Andrew's Bridge which crosses the Moskva River between the two avenues. On December 30, the section between Kutuzovsky Avenue of the Dorogomilovo District and Shmitovsky Thoroughfare of the Presnensky District was built and opened, which includes the Dorogomilovsky Bridge located between the two districts and over the Moskva River. The area east of the beltway north of Moskva River after crossing the Dorogomilovsky Bridge would become the MIBC. A tunnel interchange on Nizhnyaya Maslovka Street which goes under the beltway was built and opened on August 28, 2001, in the northern parts of the highway in the Savyolosky District. The interchange the beltway crosses Leninsky Avenue is a tunnel interchange under Gagarin Square named Gagarin's tunnel. It was constructed along with a section to Volgograd Avenue of southeastern central Moscow, with a reconstructed Avtozavodskii Bridge, on December 12. In the same year, the section between Shmitovsky Avenue and the Zvenigorod Highway was completed although the date is not clarified. On November 6, 2002, the section between Zvenigorod Highwayand and Begovaya Street located on the western part of the beltway was completed and opened, thus connecting the northern beltway with the western and southern beltway. The section between Ostapovsky Thoroughfare and Nizhny Novgorod Street on the eastern part of the beltway were built and opened on the same time as well. The area between Spartakovskaya Street and the Krasnokazarmennaya embankment by the Yauza River were finished in the Basmanny District on October 1, 2003. The section between Nizhny Novgorod Street to the Highway of the Enthusiasts, also known as Entuziastov Highway which borders the Lefortovo District in the north was finished in the same time as well. One month later, the Lefortovo Tunnel finished construction and was opened, connecting the Third Ring Road's sections in the Basmanny District, therefore closing and finishing the beltway. On November 4, 2005, four interchanges were redesigned and reconstructed: the Leningradsky Avenue interchange over the Third Ring Road (due to extensive renovation and conversion of the Avenue into a 12-lane freeway which includes an extra overpass), Sheremetyevo Street-Oktyabrskaya Street over the beltway converted into a diamond interchange, and the Zvenigorod Highway over the beltway converted into a variation of the diamond interchange. Traffic on the ring was continuous, with no traffic lights on the beltway till June 15, 2016, where a traffic light and road markings were placed on an intersection between a ramp to the Third Ring Road and Leningradsky Avenue.

== Gallery ==
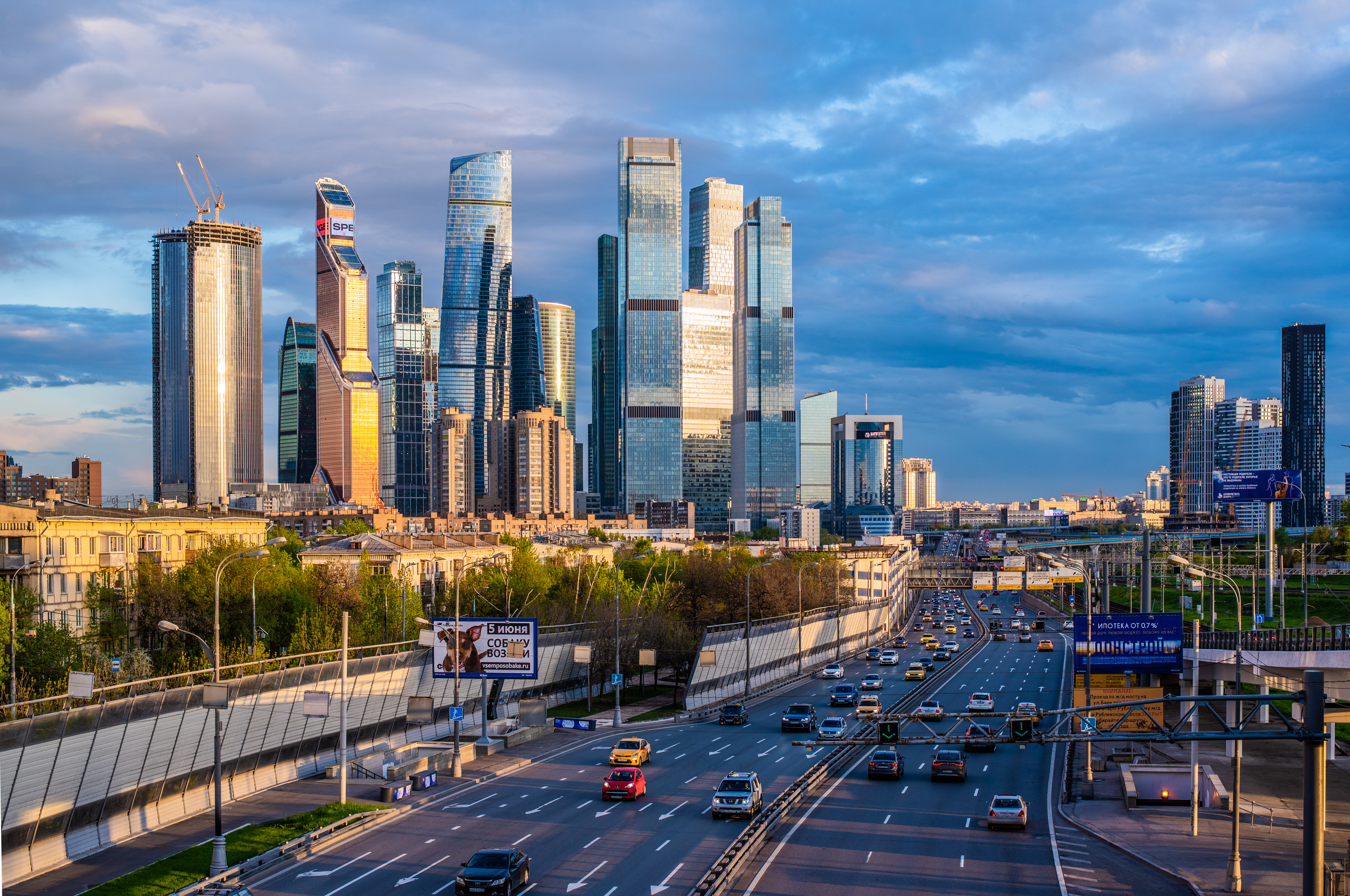
Moscow International Business Center (MIBC) in May 2022, as viewed southbound from the Third Ring Road

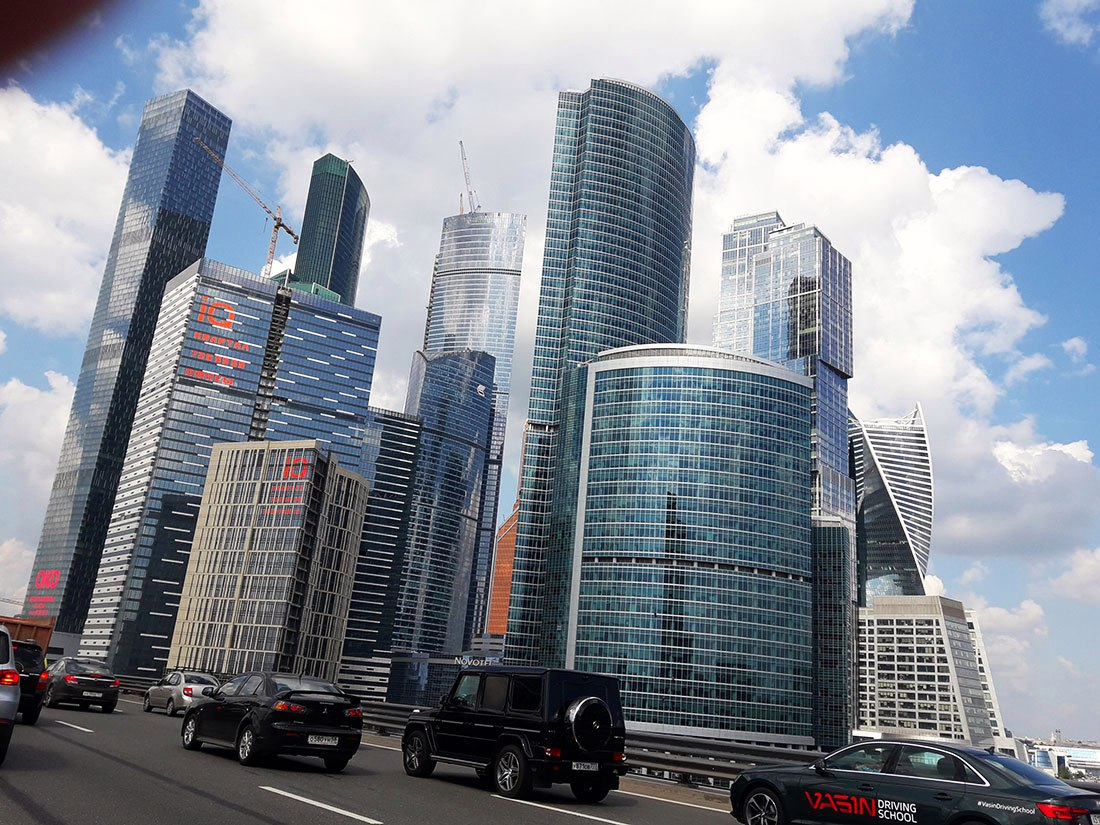
The Third Ring Road over Moskva River on the Dorogomilovsky Bridge, near the MIBC

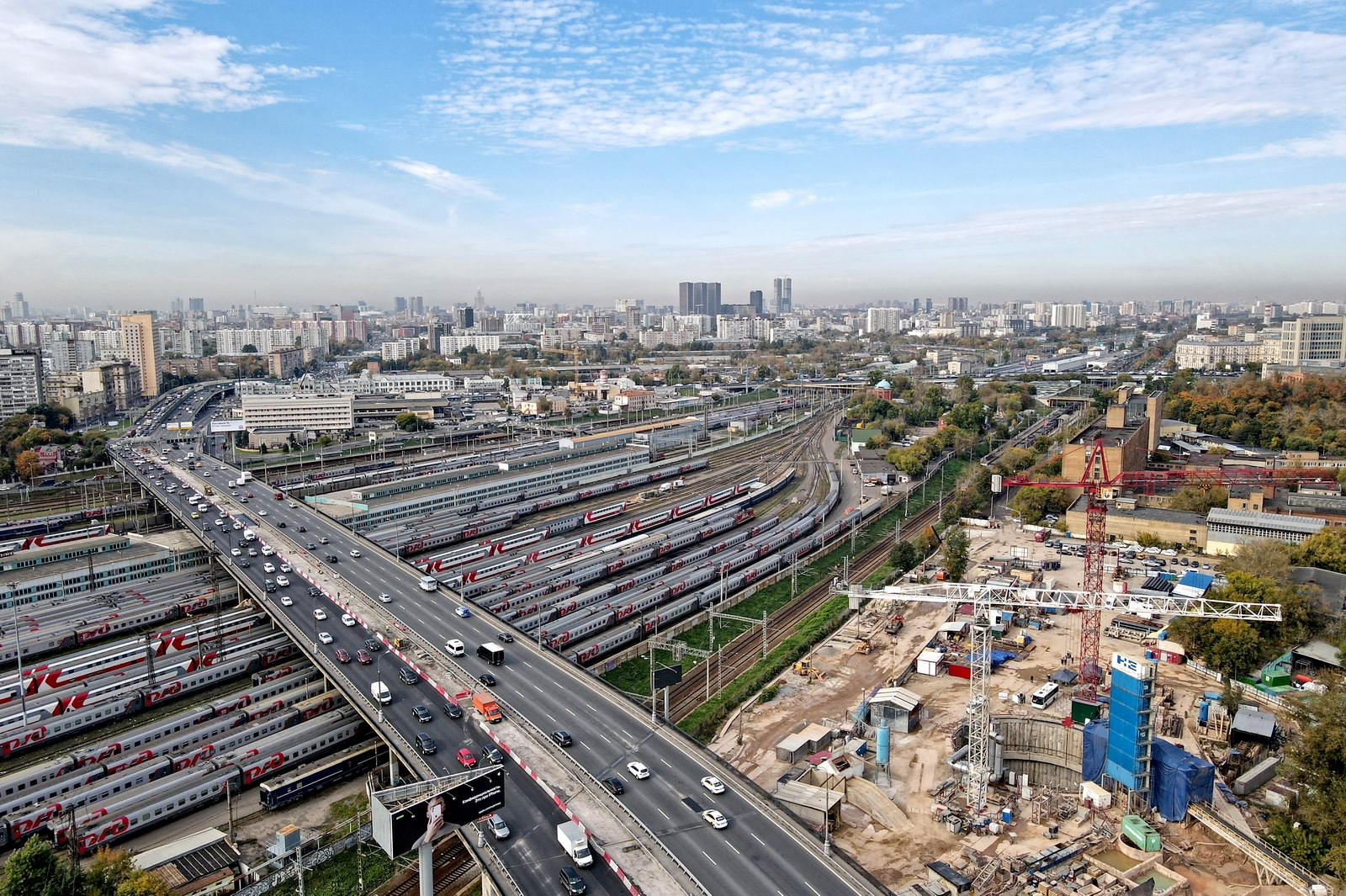
Rizhskaya overpass of the Third Ring Road

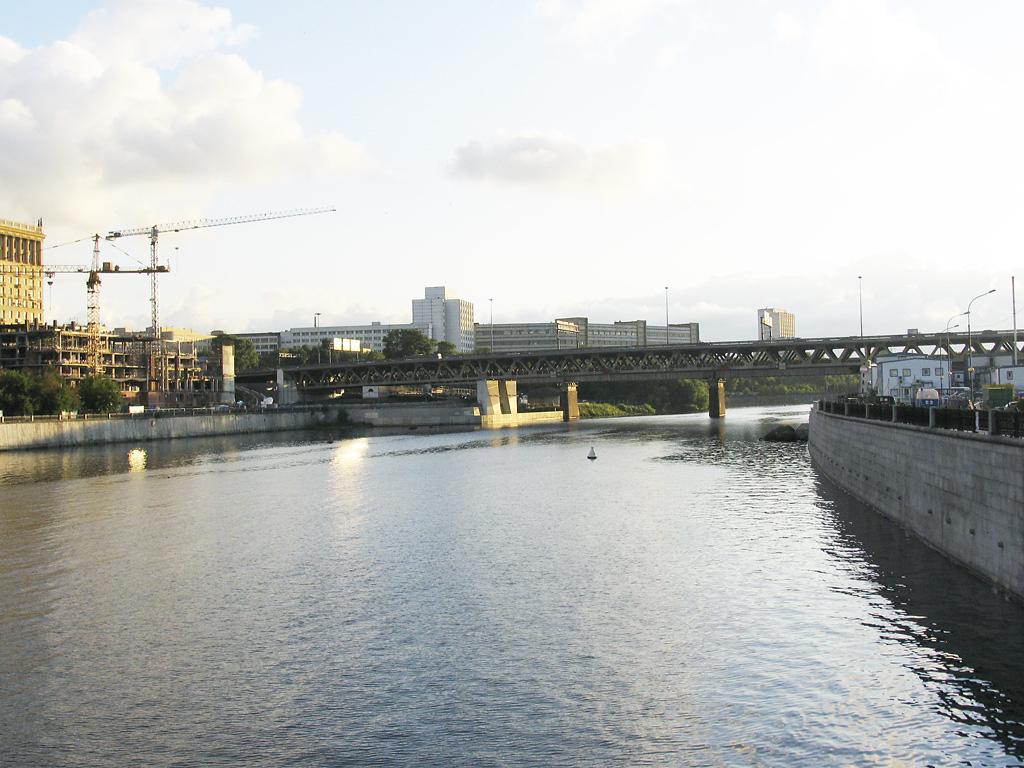
The Third Ring Road crosses the Moskva river over the Dorogomilovsky Bridge.

== See also ==
Beltways in Moscow:

- Boulevard Ring in Moscow
- Garden Ring in Moscow
- Moscow Ring Road in Moscow
