= Northern Link =

The Northern Link may refer to:

- Northern Link, Brisbane, the former name of the Legacy Way, a proposed vehicular tunnel in Brisbane, Queensland, Australia.
- Northern Link (MTR), a proposed rail link in Hong Kong, China.
- Norra länken (The northern link), Sweden is a motorway in Stockholm, Sweden
