= Österleden, Stockholm =

Planned road project in Stockholm, Sweden

Österleden (the East Route) was a planned motorway in Stockholm, Sweden. The road was intended to run on the east side of the Stockholm City Centre and link the Norra länken and Södra länken motorways to create a completed Stockholm ring road.

As of 2007 the road project had undergone a feasibility study, and was awaiting feedback from the County Administrative Board of Stockholm.

In January 2008 Kristina Axén Olin, the Mayor of Stockholm, said that the political majority in Stockholm Municipality was in favour of constructing the road, but according to the plan with the Swedish Road Administration, the construction start would not occur until 2020 and completion in 2030.

In 2018, the Österleden plan was discontinued, as it is no longer included in the national plan. A further report from the Swedish Transport Administration stated that show that the Eastern connection would not contribute to meeting the environmental goals or the goal of increased public transport usage in Stockholm. Its construction would mean that none of Stockholm's goals of reduced climate impact, improved air quality or improved living environment would be possible to achieve.

== History ==
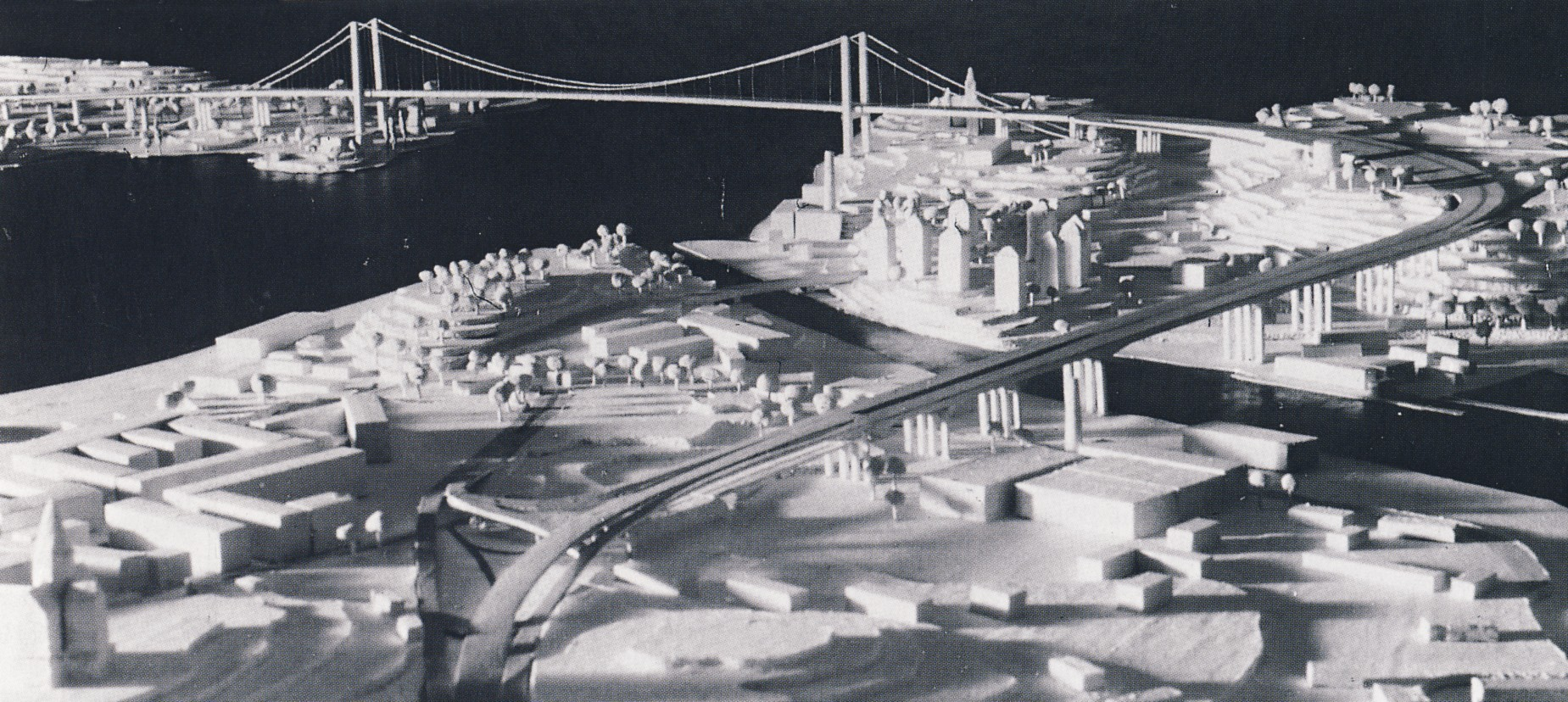
Architect model 1948 for Österbron (the East Bridge) by the German consulting firm Fritsch & Co, Heidelberg

Plans on a road connection using a bridge east of the city centre were part of the early regional plans, and city general plans in 1928 and 1960.

A motorway in a tunnel east of the city centre was one of the road projects of the Dennis Agreement from 1992, a political agreement for road construction in the Stockholm area. Österleden was to be the eastern part of a ring road around central Stockholm. The planning of the road was cancelled in 1997 when the agreement was broken.

== Pre-study 2006 ==
Proposal C: A tunnel from Värtan under Östermalm, with a connection option at Nybrokajen, and further under the waters east of the Old Town towards Södermalm, under Stadsgårdskajen to connect with traffic at Danvikstull.Estimated cost: 12-15 billion kronor.

== Studied alignments ==
The feasibility study contains three suggested alignments of the road:

- Alternative C
  - New tunnel beneath the Stockholm City Centre west of Southern Djurgården
  - Estimated cost: 12–15 billion SEK
- Alternative D
  - New tunnel with approximately the same alignment as in the early 1990s plans, beneath Saltsjön and Djurgården
  - Estimated cost: 9–12 billion SEK
- Alternative F
  - New tunnel between Nacka and Lidingö
  - Estimated cost: 10–15 billion SEK
