= Norra länken =

Motorway in Stockholm, Sweden

Coordinates: 59°20′53″N 018°01′59″E

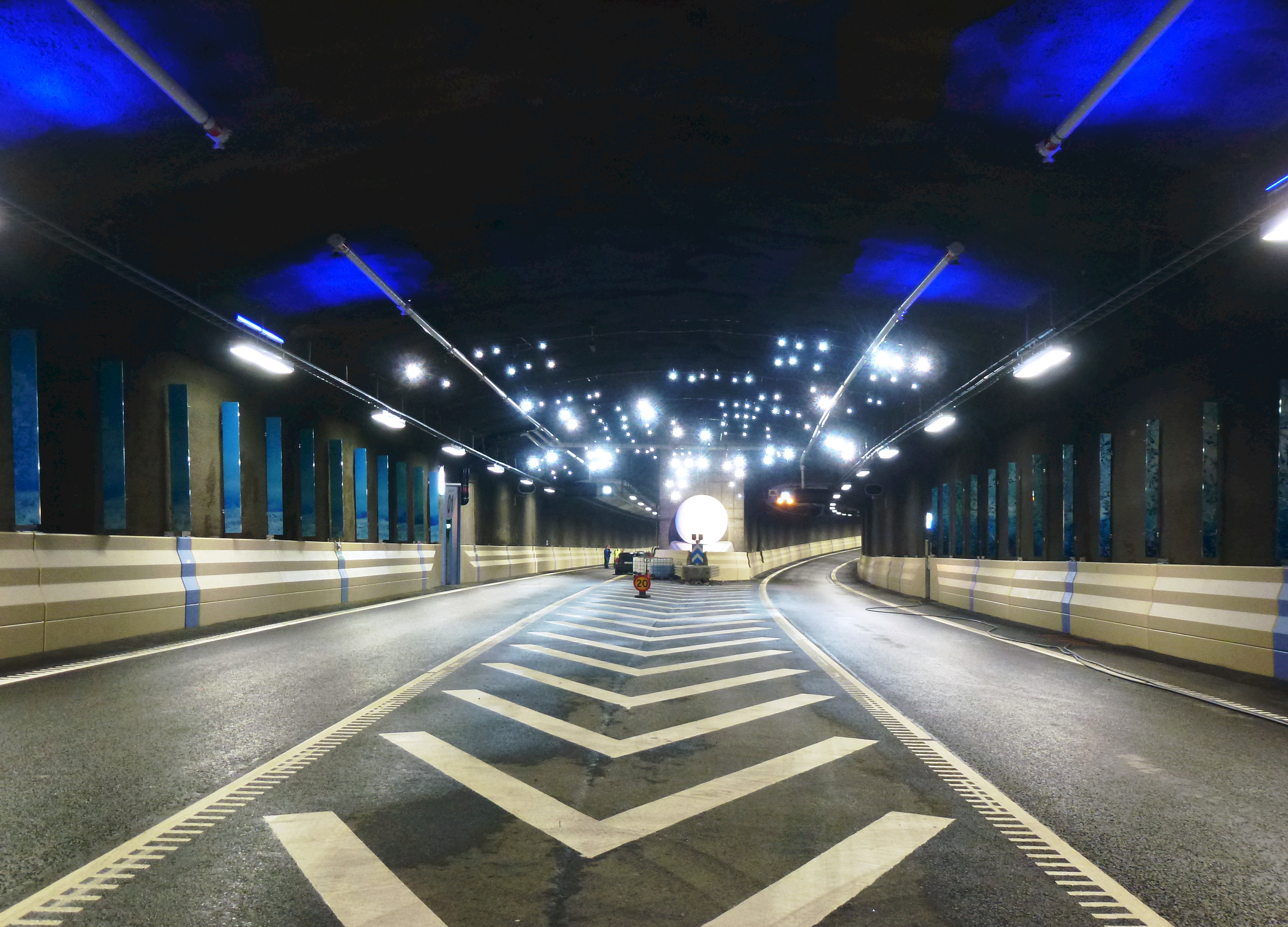
Norra länken (trafikplats "vinter"), November 2014.

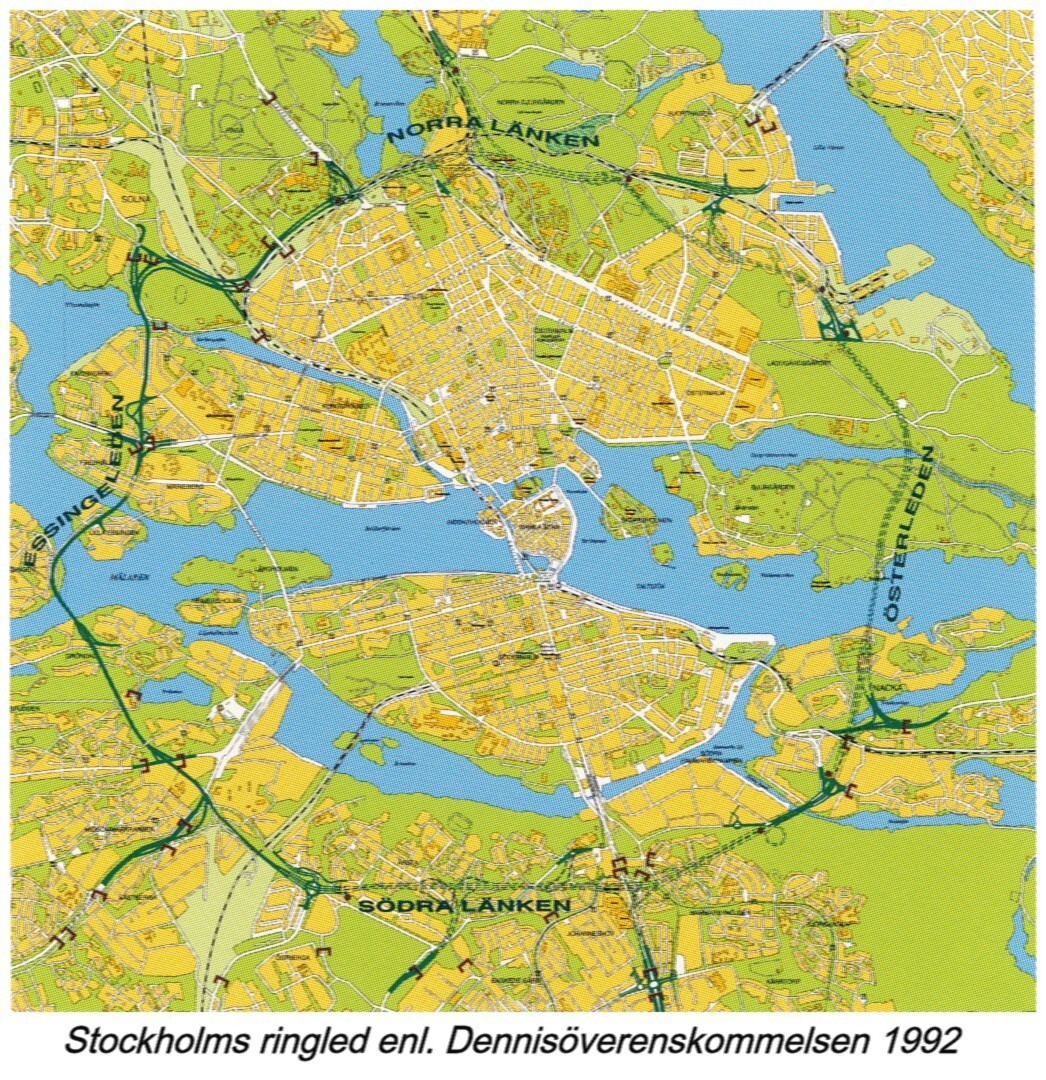
The Ring, party established

Norra länken (The northern link) is a motorway in Stockholm, Sweden, between the port of Värtahamnen and Karlberg, where it connects to Essingeleden. The road is part of the European route E20 and the incomplete Stockholm Ring Road.

Norra länken is 5 kilometers (3 mi) in length, 4 km (2.5 mi) of which are in tunnels. The part between Karlberg and Norrtull was opened in 1991, and the tunnel between Norrtull and Värtan was opened in 2014. The other parts of the ring road are the highly congested Essingeleden in the west, opened in 1966, Södra länken in the south, opened in 2004, and Österleden in the east, where (as of September 2017) plans have been canceled.

== History ==
The part of Norra länken between Karlberg and Norrtull was finished and opened in 1991. As part of the Dennis Agreement (Dennisöverenskommelsen), a political agreement, the construction eastward of the remaining part to Värtahamnen was to be completed as well. The construction was cancelled in 1997 when the project was appealed to the Supreme Administrative Court which determined that the detail plan for the part between Norrtull and Roslagstull was in conflict with the law protecting the Royal National City Park. The political agreement was broken and it was uncertain whether the road project would be completed.

The government and Stockholm Municipality agreed in 2002 on a new alignment between Norrtull and Roslagstull. The detail plan was again appealed, but the Supreme Administrative Court rejected the appeal on February 26, 2007, and construction resumed on May 11, 2007. The tunnel between Nortull and Värtahamnen was opened on November 30, 2014, and the total cost of the tunnel was 10.6 billion SEK. Entrances and exits have been placed at the areas of Norrtull, Roslagstull, Frescati, and Värtahamnen.

== Roslagstull ==
Just north of Roslagstull, under the Albanoberget mountain, a large underground interchange has been built at different levels with a connection to Roslagsvägen at Frescati. Here the tunnels of the link intersect the metro tunnel and a district heating tunnel.

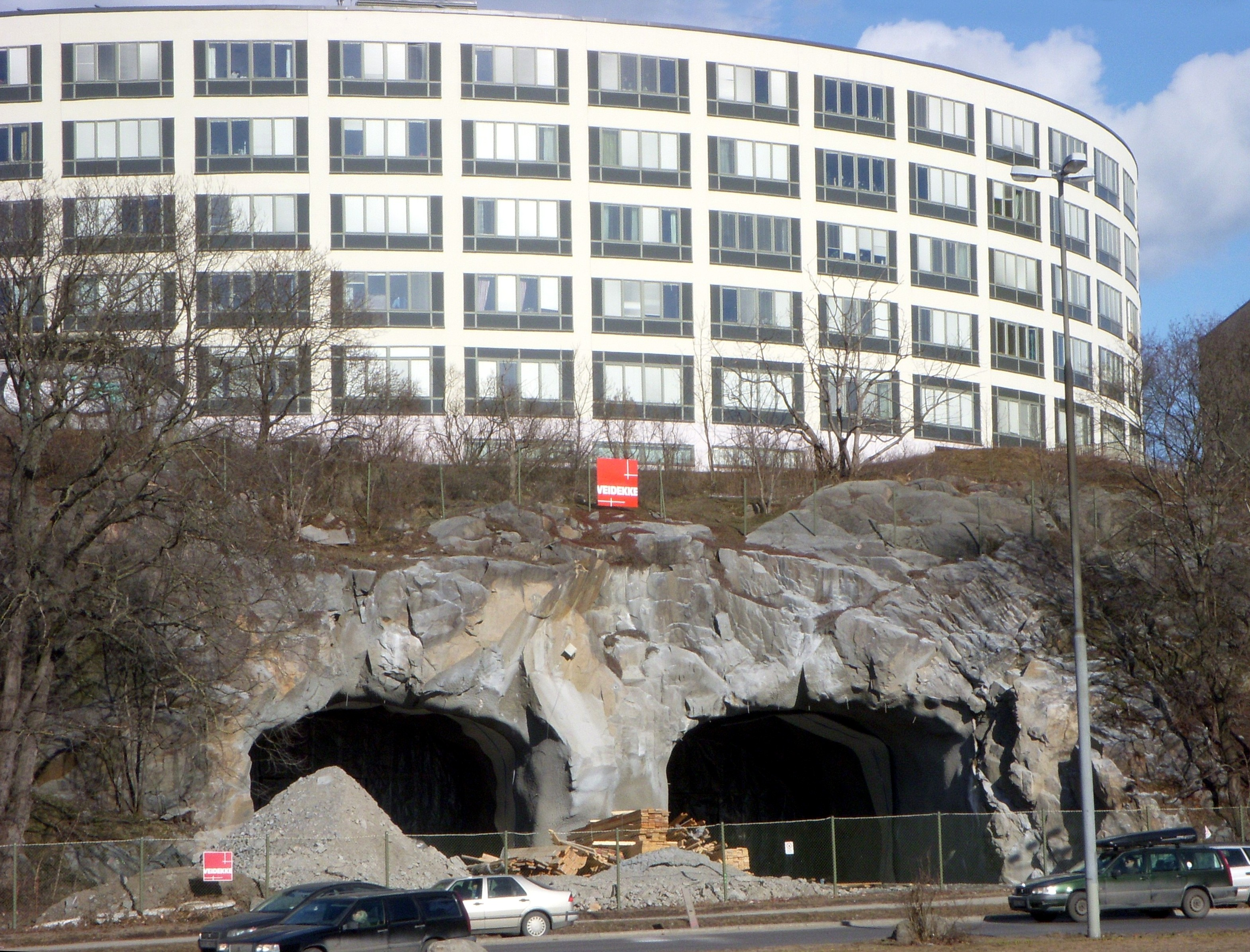
The tunnel openings at Roslagstull, March 26, 2011

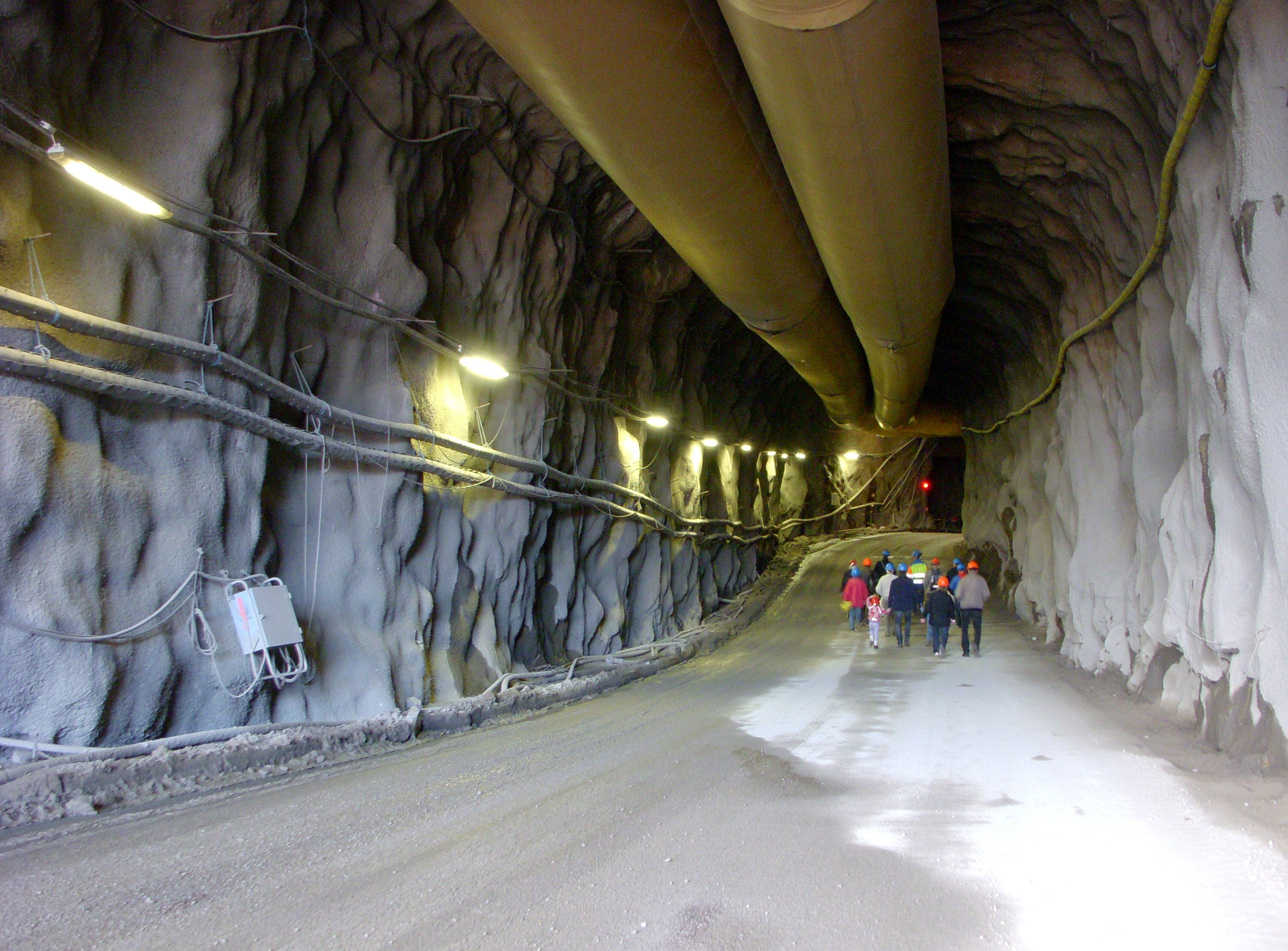
The work tunnel at Frescati,October 4, 2009

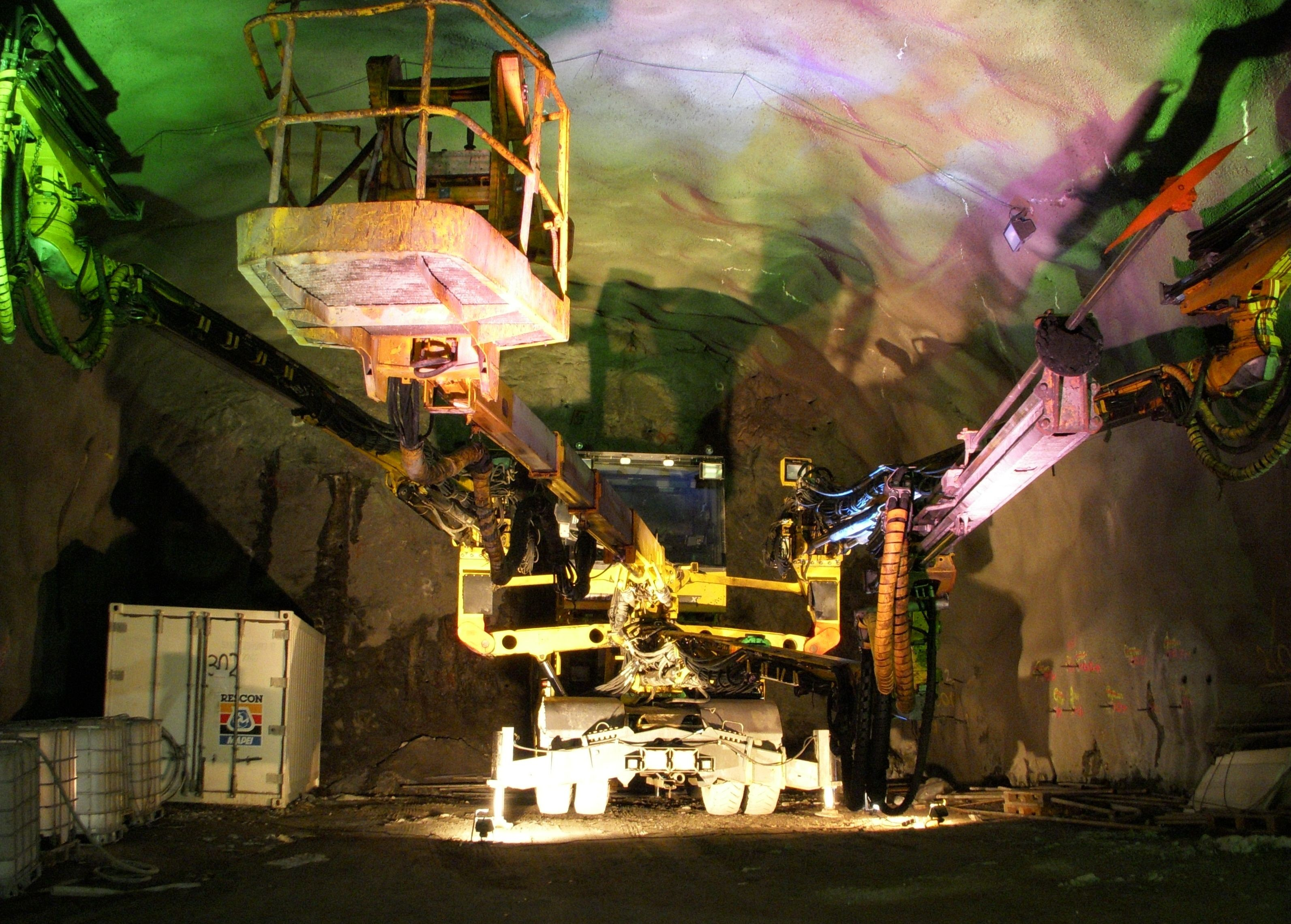
The tunnel in October 2009

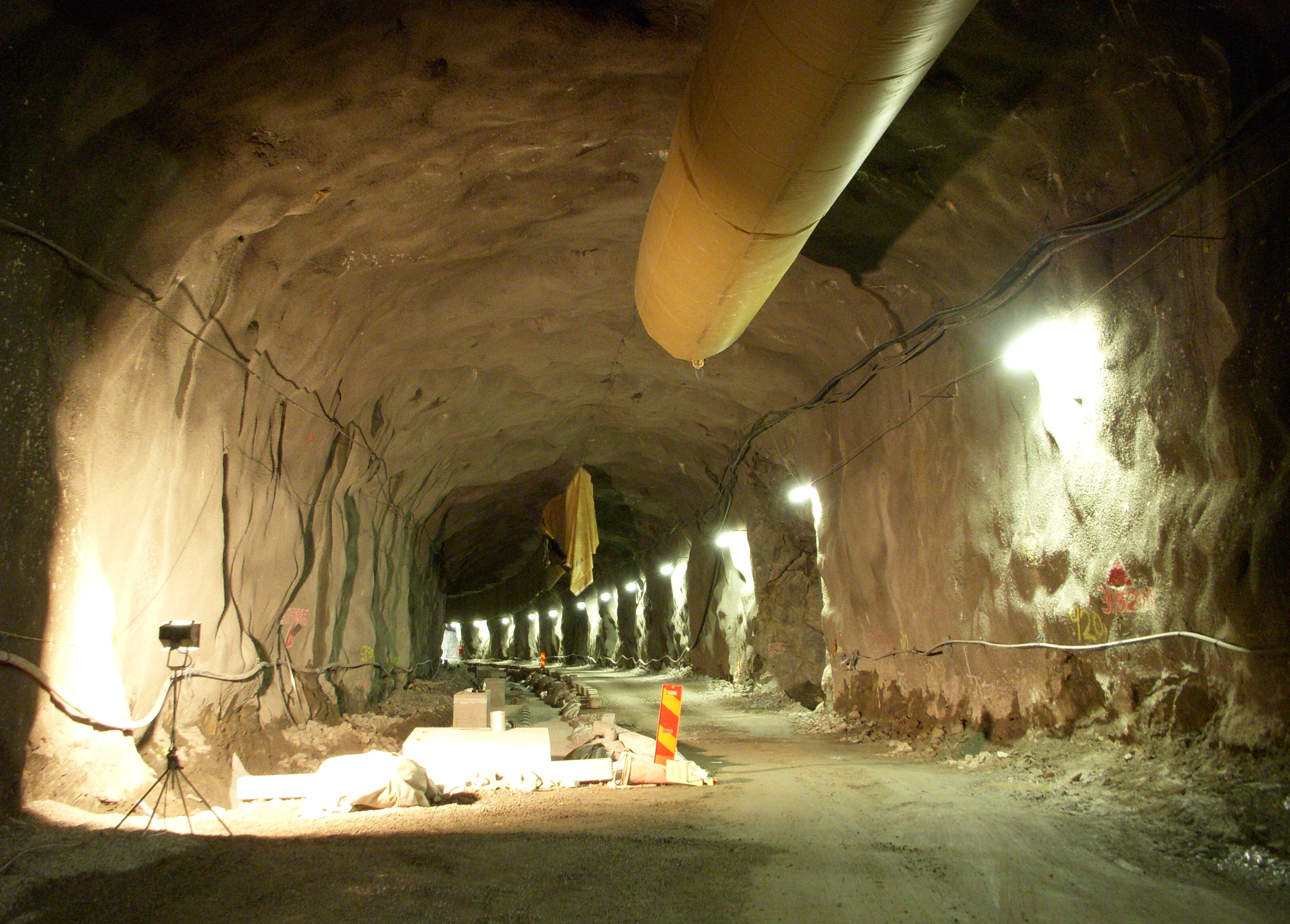
The connection tunnel towards Roslagsvägen, October 4, 2009
