= Stockholm Ring Road =

Planned ring road in Stockholm Municipality, Sweden

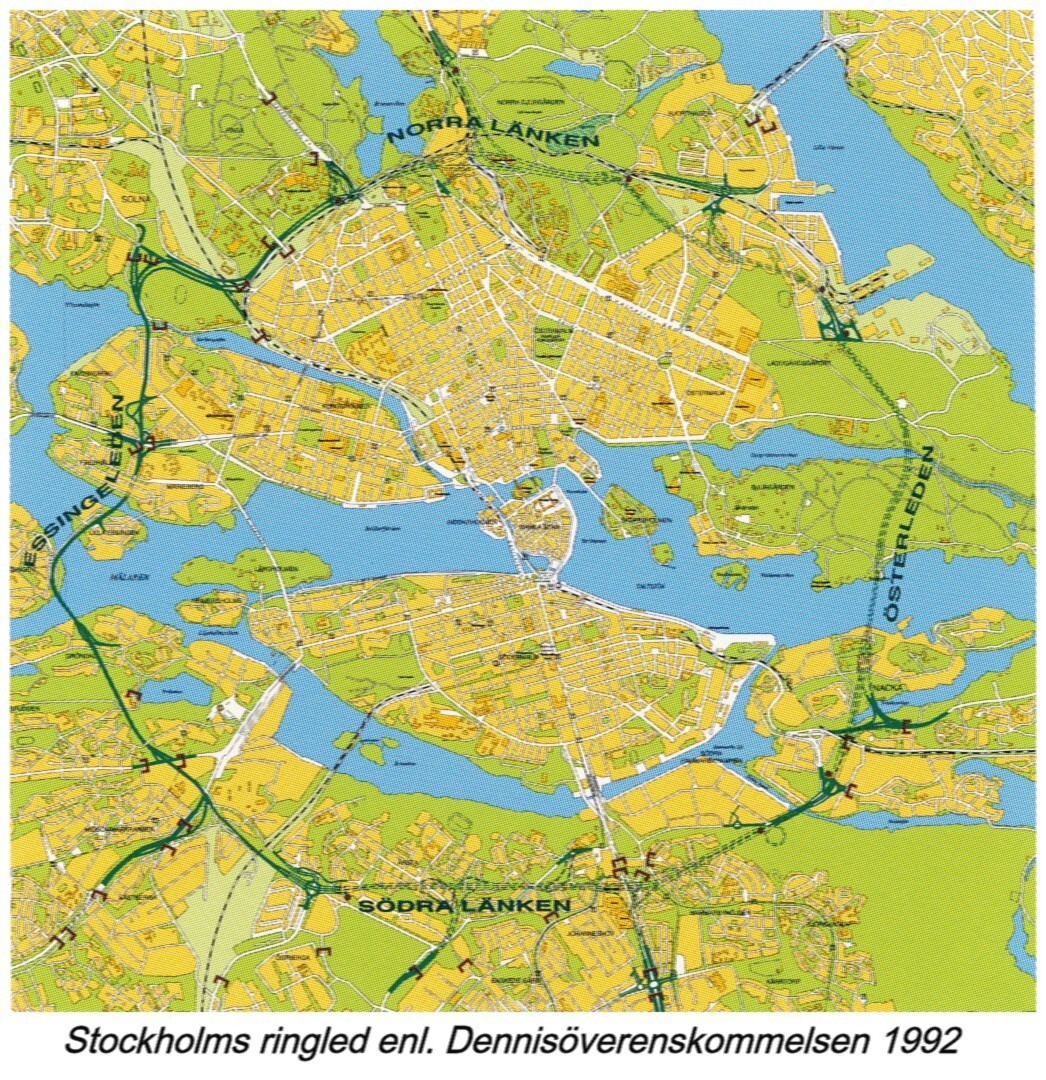
Stockholm ring road according to the 1992 plan

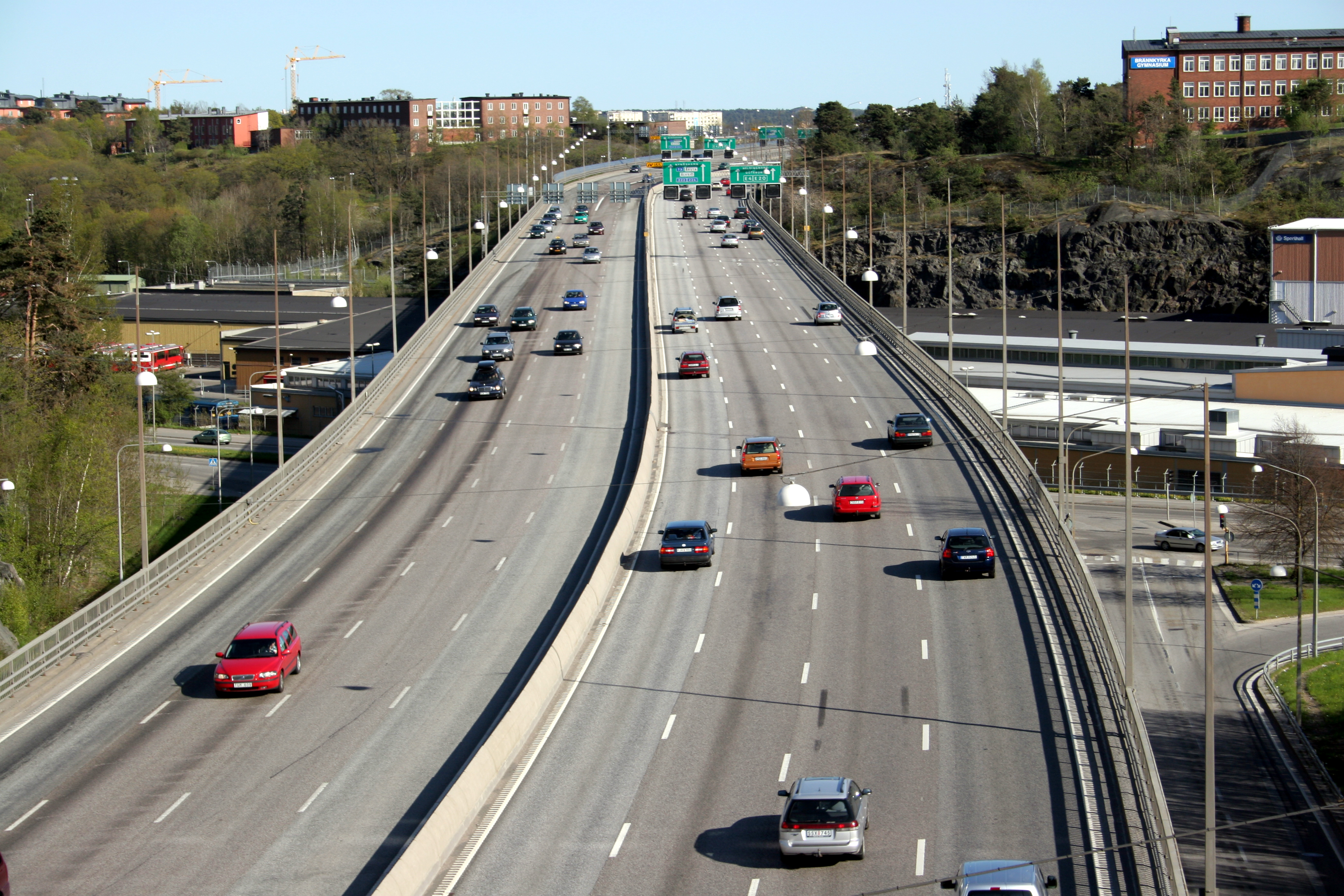
Essingeleden

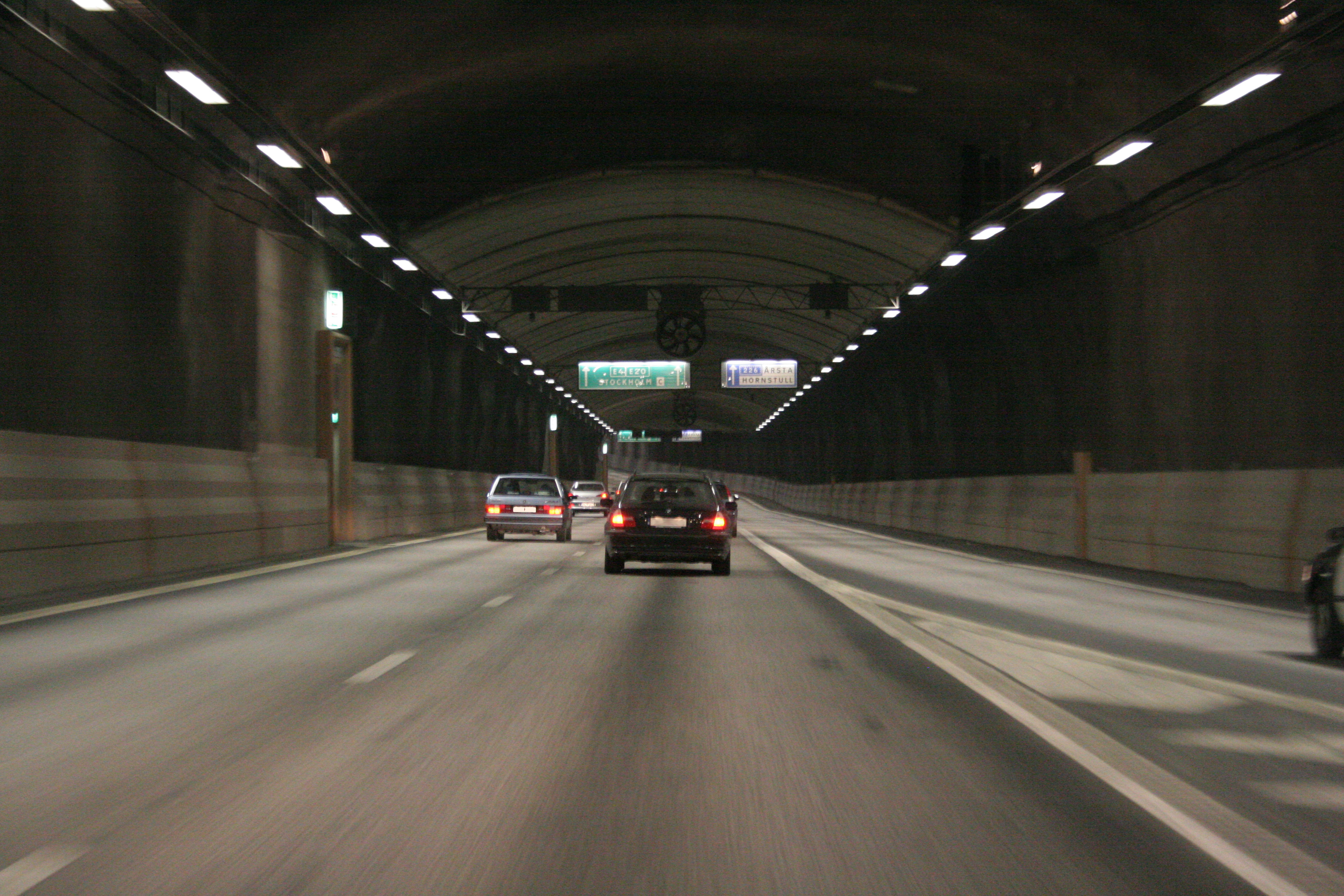
Södra länken

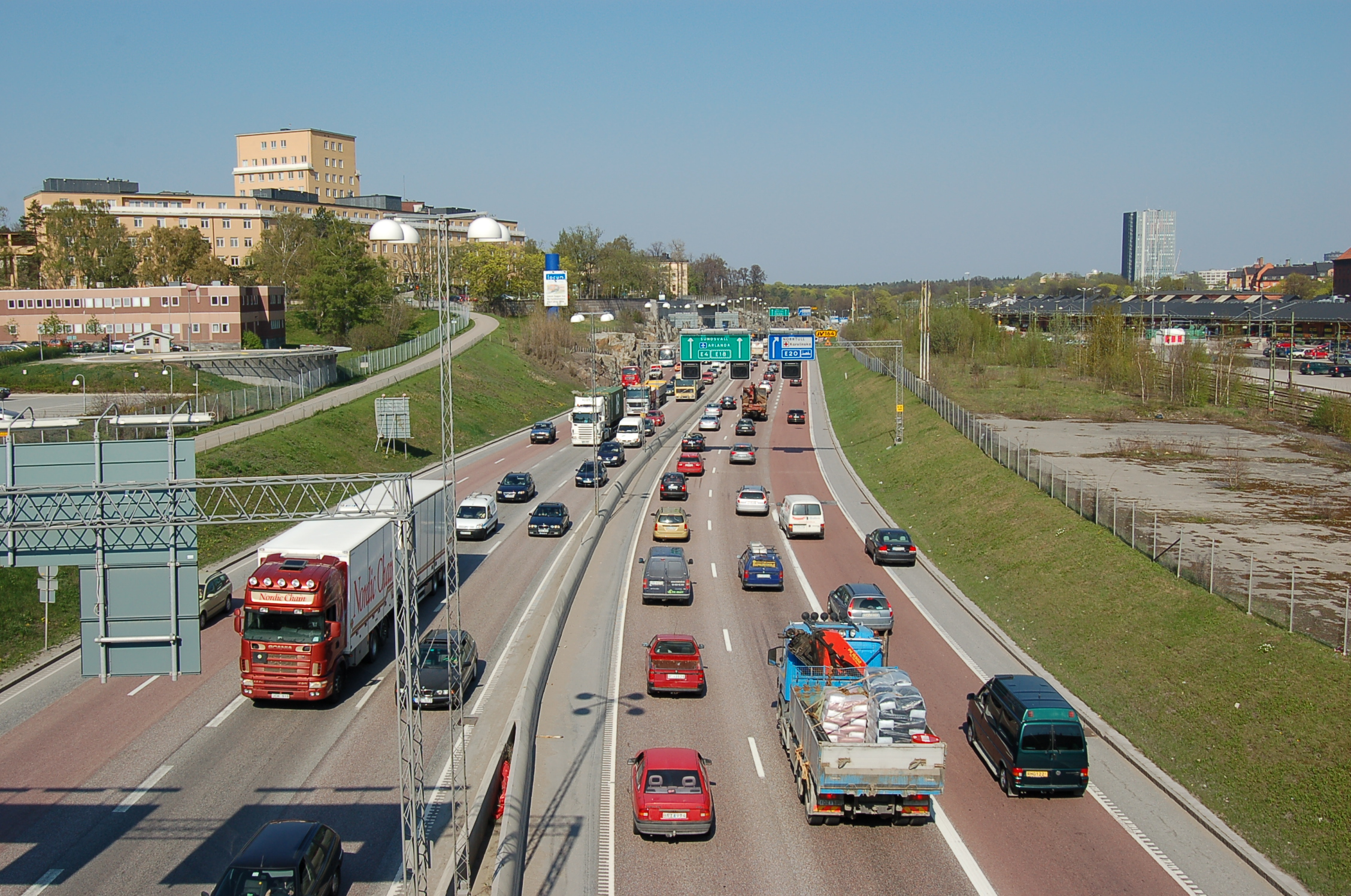
Norra länken

The Stockholm Ring Road (Swedish: Stockholms ringled) is a half-completed ring road around central Stockholm, Sweden. There have been many plans over the years of a ring road around central Stockholm, but all of them have been cancelled at some point. As of 2015, three quarters of the ring road have been built.

== History ==
The first plan to build a motorway ring road around central Stockholm arose in the 1950s. The recent ring road project in Stockholm has its origin in the Dennis Agreement (Dennisöverenskommelsen) from 1992, which was a political agreement (negotiated by the Bank of Sweden governor Bengt Dennis) to build new roads and improve public transport in and around Stockholm. As the agreement was eventually broken in 1997 due to criticism from environmental groups and the political parties left outside the agreement, the future of a complete ring road became uncertain.

A possibility of a ring road being completed arose in the mid-2000s, as the construction of the northern section resumed during 2006 with preparatory work, the final appeals against construction were rejected on February 26, 2007, by the Supreme Administrative Court. Actual construction of the road resumed on May 11, 2007, and the project was finally completed in 2015, save for a northbound exit which is planned in 2016. A new feasibility study was conducted on the eastern section in 2006. A second shorter study, looking at a deeper tunnel with less impact on the surface during construction, was conducted in 2015, and is currently awaiting political blessing. In 2018, the eastern section plan was discontinued, as it is no longer included in the national plan.

== Road sections ==
There are four distinct sections of the planned ring road around Stockholm, of which two are completed, one in construction, and one under consideration.

- Essingeleden, the western section — completion of various stages between 1966 and 1971.
- Södra länken, the southern section — short section opened 1973, inauguration of the completed road 2004
- Norra länken, the northern section — short section opened in 1991, construction of the rest halted in 1997, construction resumed 2006–2007, and the road tunnel was opened in 2014.
- Österleden, the eastern section — planning cancelled in 1997. New feasibility study completed in 2006, second study in 2015. Previous estimates predicted construction start in 2020 and completion in 2030, however this plan was discontinued and removed from the national plan in 2018.
