= Södra länken =

Underground highway in Stockholm, Sweden

Coordinates: 59°17′47″N 018°03′25″E

National Road 75
- Riksväg 75
- Södra länken The southern link
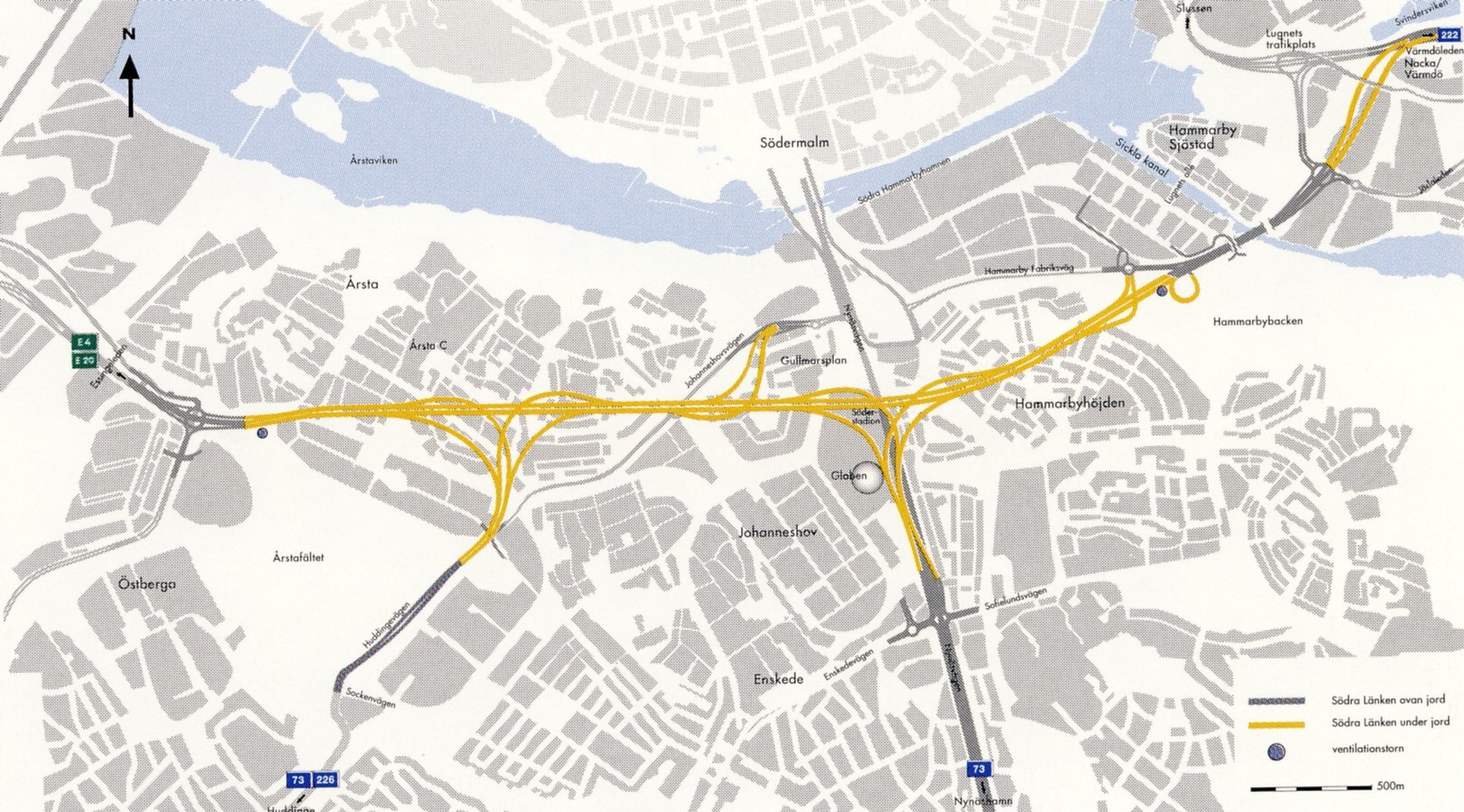
- Södra Länken, Vägverkets map

Location
- Country: Sweden

Highway system
- Roads in Sweden; National Roads; County Roads

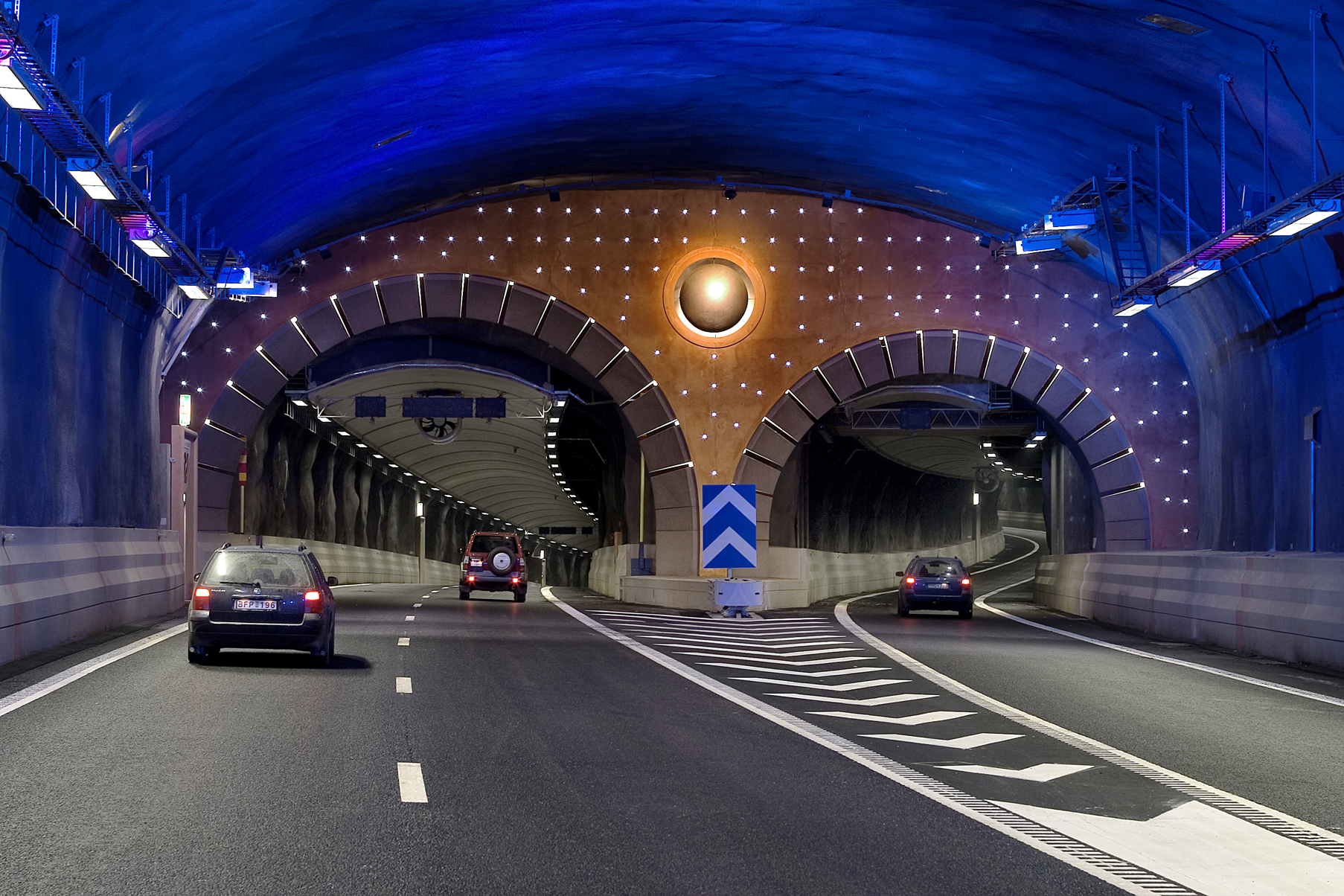
Exit Nynäsvägen to west

Södra länken (lit. 'the Southern Link'), designated as national road 75 (Swedish: Riksväg 75), is a motorway in Sweden connecting Essingeleden (E4, E20), Stockholm with Värmdöleden (county road 222), Nacka. Södra länken is 6 km (3.7 mi) in length, of which 4.5 km (2.8 mi) is in tunnels. This makes it the third longest urban motorway tunnel in Europe after Madrid M30 orbital motorway and Blanka tunnel complex in Prague at 5.5 km (3.4 mi). The tunnel is 4 lanes wide each way at its widest point (total 8 lanes).

The construction of Södra länken began in 1997, and it was inaugurated on 24 October 2004. The total cost was about 7.9 billion SEK (around 800–900 million USD at the 2003–2004 exchange rate). The link was built primarily to decrease traffic in the centre of Stockholm. Given the high construction costs and the possibility that overall traffic volumes might increase, it was one of the greatest subjects of debate during the 1990s and early 2000s in the Swedish capital. It was financed mainly with governmental money and is not a toll road. The reason for building it in a tunnel almost all the way is a law from the 1990s which more or less forbids construction of a new motorway (or similar road) near residential areas inside cities, for noise and pollution reasons.

Södra länken is the southern section of the planned Stockholm Ring Road.

== See also ==
- Stockholm congestion tax
