= Blanka tunnel complex =

Blanka Tunnel
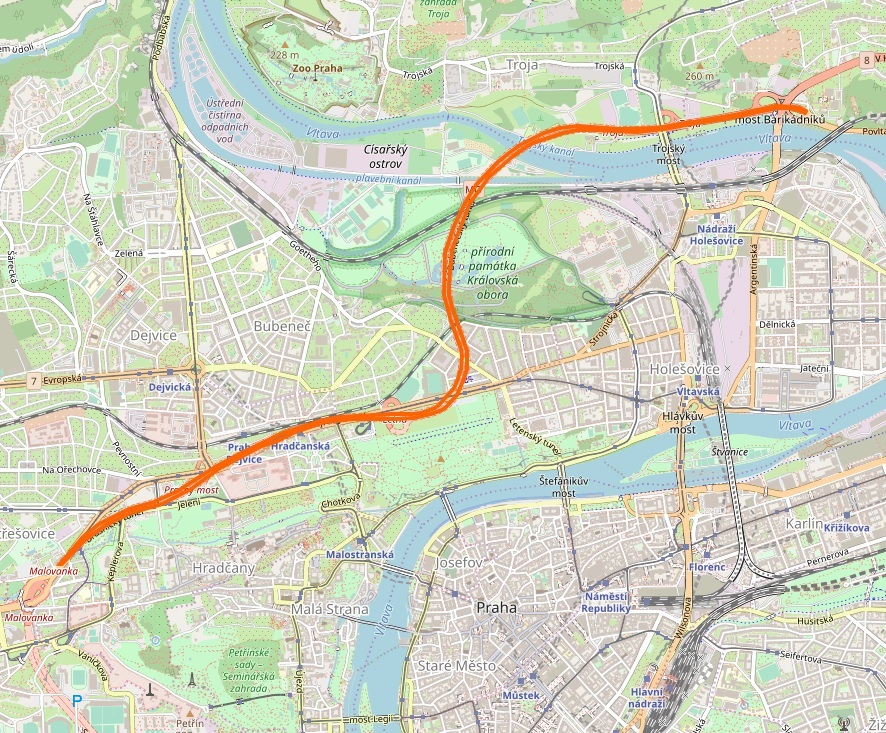
- Interactive map of Blanka Tunnel

Overview
- Location: Prague, Czech Republic
- Coordinates: 50°6′20.95″N 14°25′1.07″E

Operation
- Work began: 2007
- Opened: 19 September 2015; 10 years ago
- Traffic: automobile
- Vehicles per day: 88,000 (2018)

Technical
- Length: 5,502 m (3.4 mi)
- No. of lanes: 4

Blanka Tunnel Complex (Czech: Tunelový komplex Blanka) is a part of the inner Prague Municipal Ring Road. It is the longest road tunnel in the Czech Republic and the longest city tunnel in Europe. The complex connects the area west of Prague Castle with Trója district in the northeast. Its length is about 5.5 km and consists of three tunnels: Bubenečský, Dejvický and Brusnický. The tunnel complex was designed to relieve the historic center of Prague from heavy traffic. In a first 49-month period it was used by 139 million cars, according to official statistics.

== Controversies ==
During the construction there were three landfalls, two times in the Stromovka park, which created a hole on the ground of the park, with a diameter of 15 to 25 meters, and once at the garden area of the Ministry of Culture in Hradčany. The incident was investigated by the police and damages were estimated at tens of millions of CZK.

The construction of the Blanka tunnel was launched back in 2006 by then mayor of Prague Pavel Bém, although it was planned since 1993. The tunnel cost tax payers some 43 billion crowns (2015), much more than the originally announced 21.2 billion. However, this price doesn't include all construction costs. Initially due to open in 2011, the biggest and most expensive project in the history of Prague was repeatedly delayed. The tunnel was officially opened to the public on 19 September 2015.

The building permit from 2004 set a condition that the tunnel must not be put into full operation, until the north-eastern part of the outer Prague Ring Road is completed. However, this condition has not been met, and as supposed, it will not be completed before 2028. That's why Blanka Tunnel was not officially approved. The authorities circumvented the condition so that the tunnel was opened formally only in trial operation. In 2019, the condition in the construction permit was cancelled, and the tunnel was finally approved for full operation.

The city's leadership, led by Mayor Pavel Bém, originally promised that the tunnel would reduce traffic, noise and emissions throughout the area. But according to the environmental association AutoMat, the amount of traffic emissions has increased and continues to exceed health limits. The number of cars on Prague streets has increased by 11% due to induced demand, and traffic congestion has worsened. Every year, traffic in Blanka tunnel complex produces more than 40 million kilograms of CO_{2}.

== Gallery ==
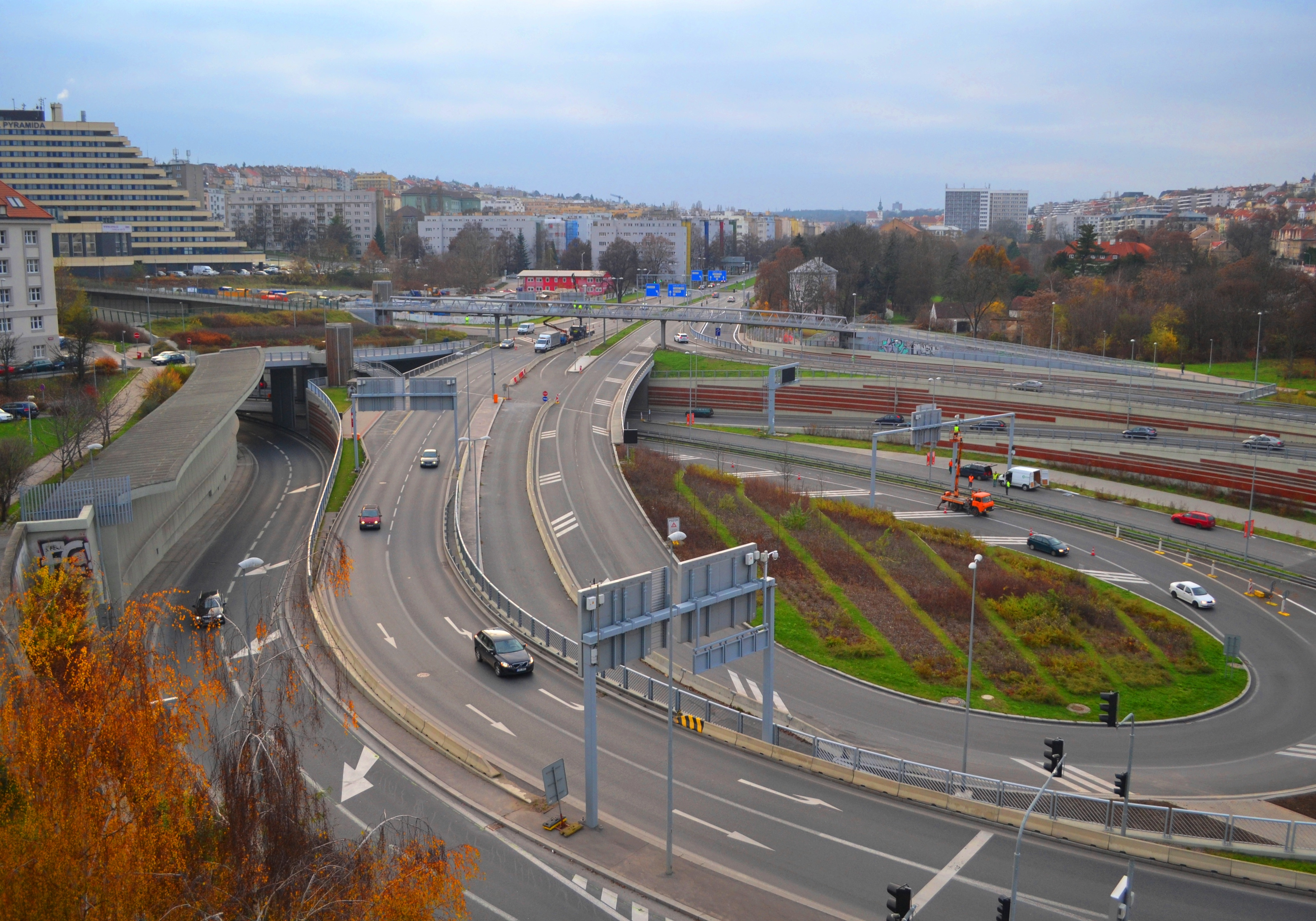
Tunnel exit, the Malovanka junction in Střešovice

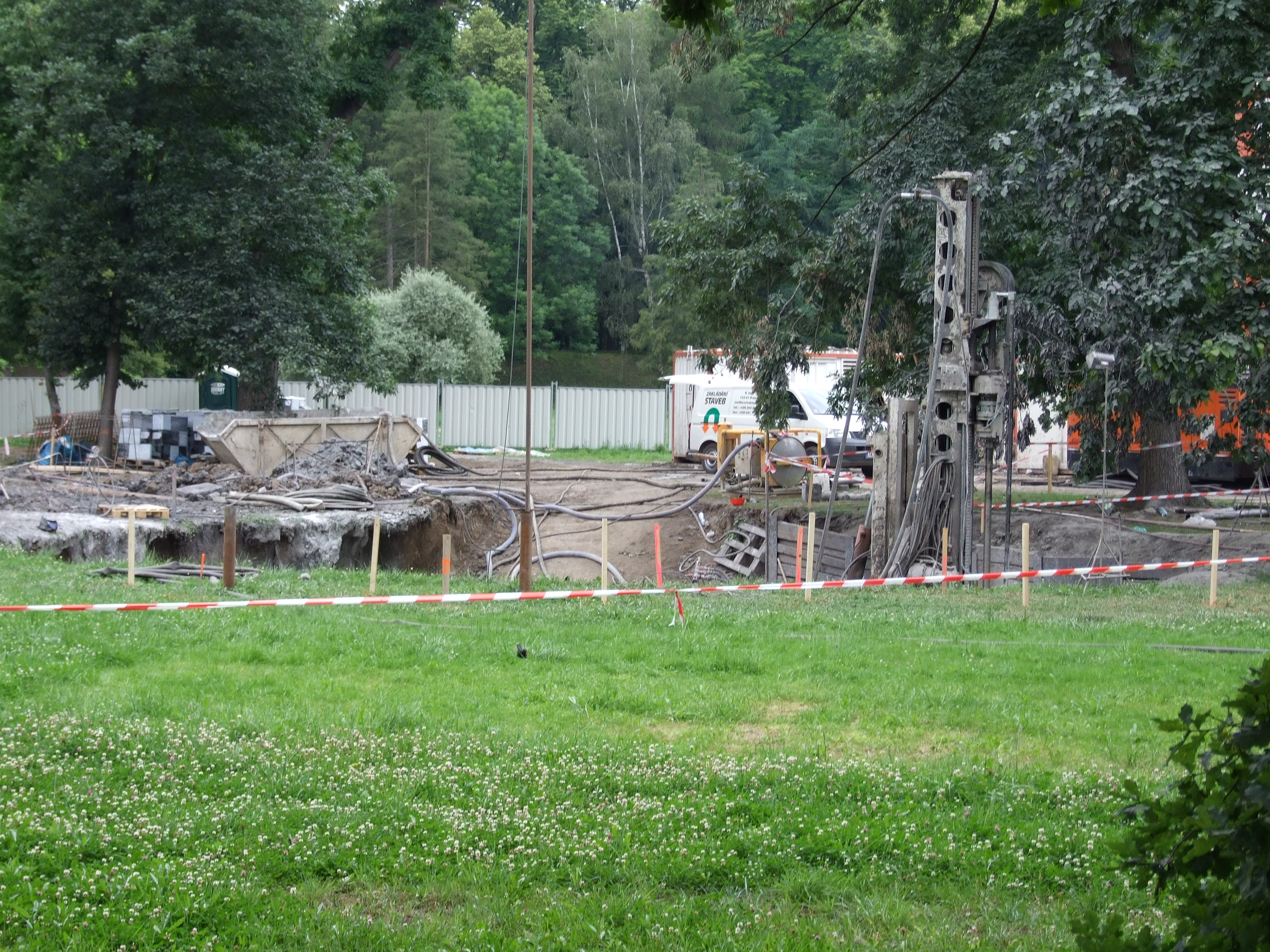
Hole in Stromovka park

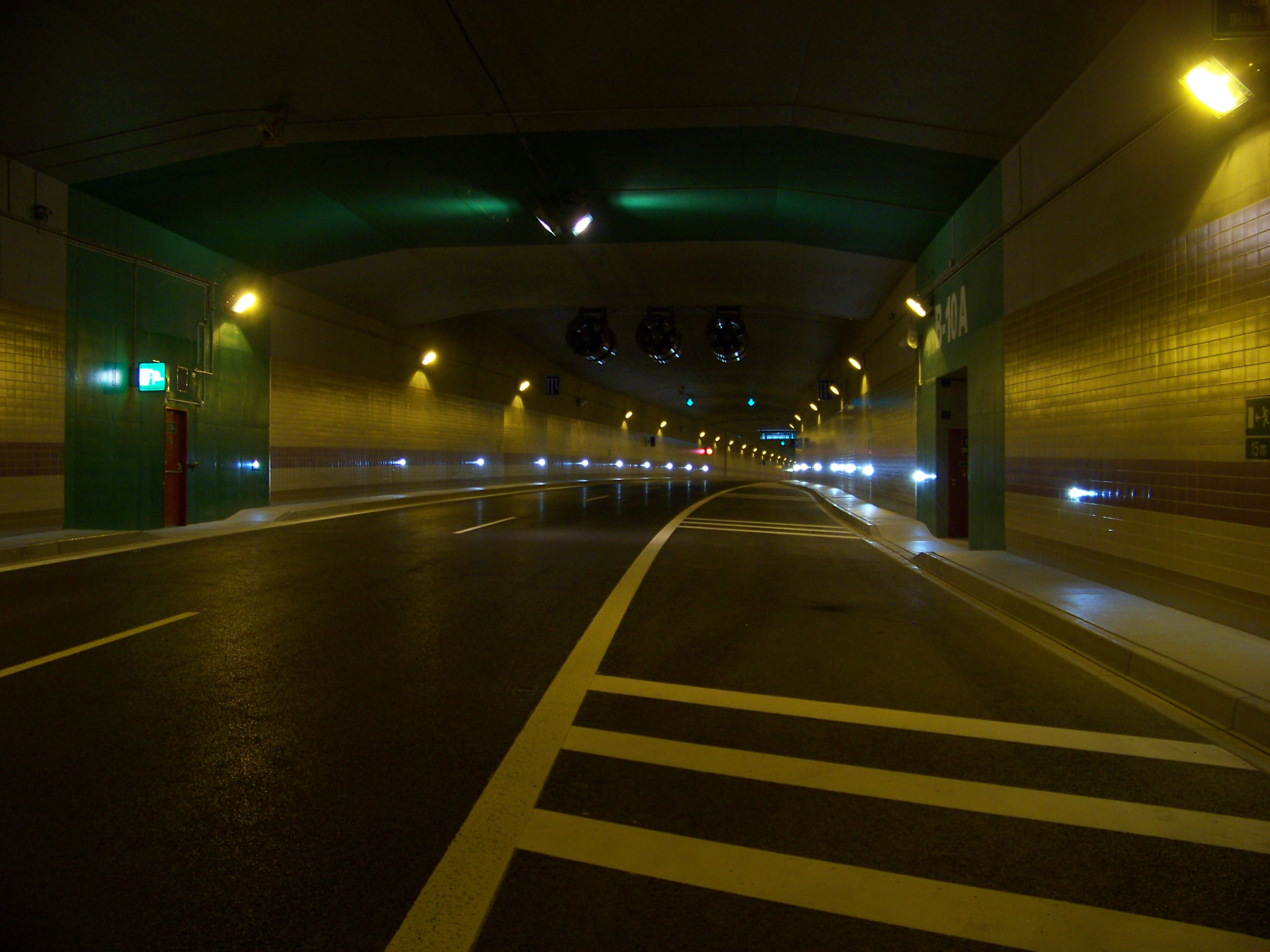
Bubenečský tunnel

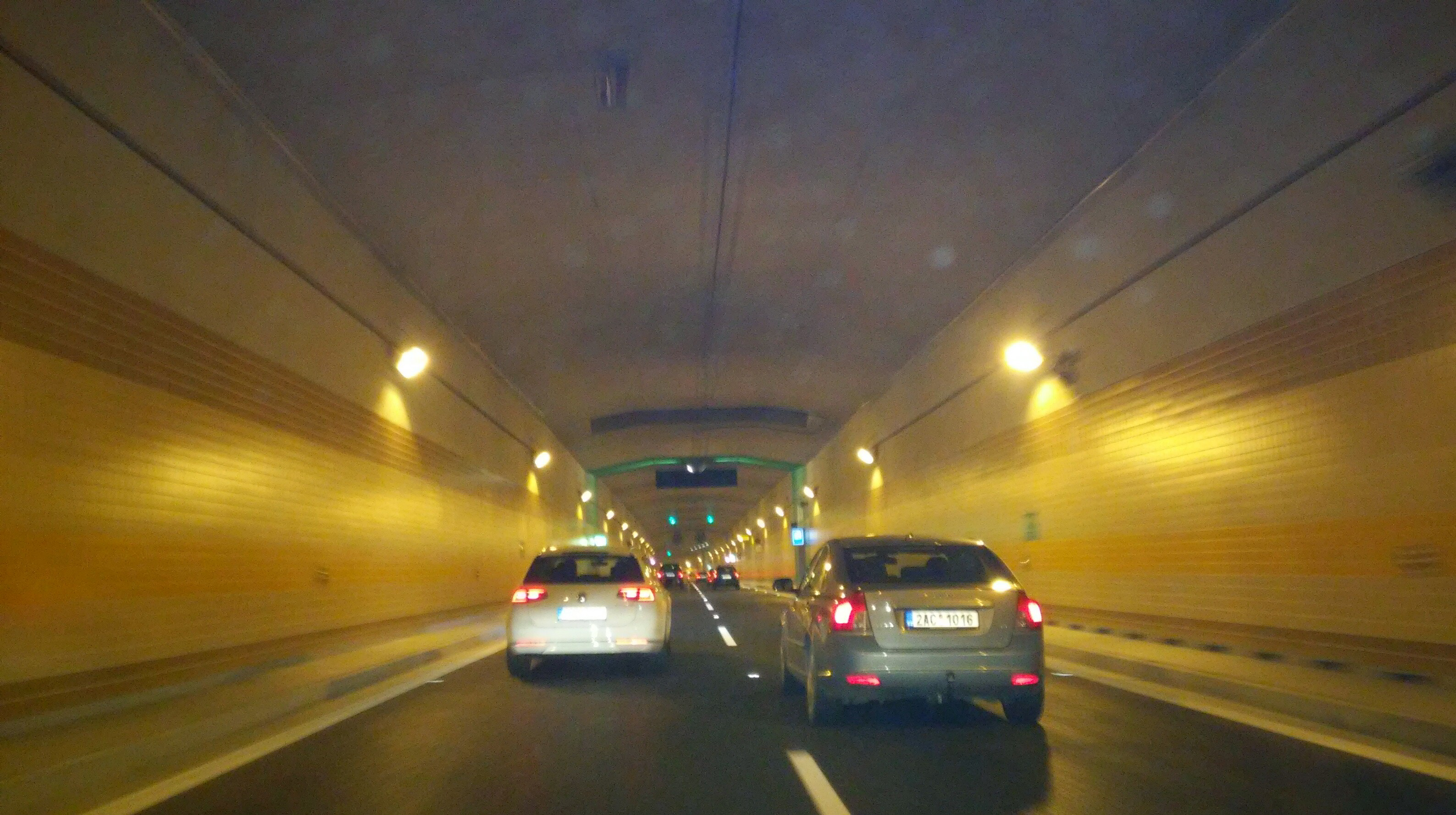
Brusnický tunel
