= Le Curé de Tours =

1832 long short story by Honoré de Balzac

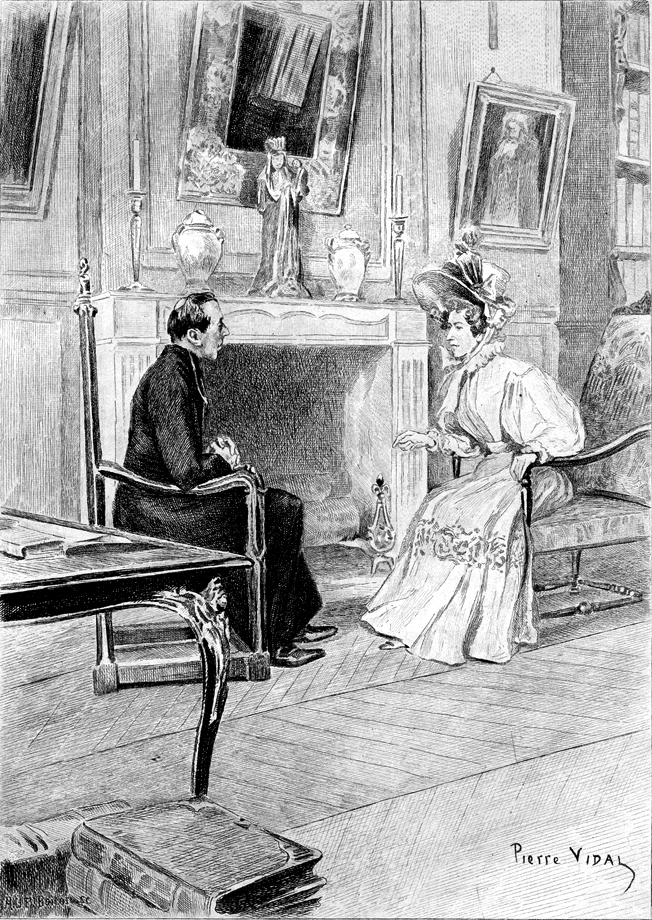
- Image from Le Curé de Tours
- Author: Honoré de Balzac
- Illustrator: Pierre Vidal
- Language: French
- Series: La Comédie humaine
- Publisher: Mame-Delaunay
- Publication date: 1832
- Publication place: France
- Preceded by: Pierrette
- Followed by: La Rabouilleuse

Le Curé de Tours (French pronunciation: [lə kyʁe də tuʁ]) is a long short story (or, more properly, a novella) by Honoré de Balzac, written in 1832.

Originally entitled Les Célibataires ("The Celibates"), it was published in that year in volume III of the 2nd edition of Scènes de la vie privée, then republished in 1833 and again in 1839, still with the same title but as one of the Scènes de la vie de province. Not until 1843 did it take on its present title of Le Curé de Tours when it appeared in volume II of Scènes de la vie de province (volume VI of his vast narrative series La Comédie humaine).

== Plot summary ==
The action takes place in or near Tours, with a brief excursion to Paris, in the year 1826. The Abbé François Birotteau and the Abbé Hyacinthe Troubert, both of whom are priests at Tours, have separate lodgings in the house belonging to the crabby spinster Sophie Gamard in that city. Birotteau is an other-worldly, gentle, introspective type; Troubert, who is ten years younger than his fellow boarder, is very much of the world: he is a careerist devoured by ambition.

Birotteau prides himself on his furniture and fine library, inherited from his friend and predecessor as parish priest of Saint-Gatien de Tours. Without reading all its clauses, or at least without remembering them, he signs a document handed to him by Mlle Gamard, forfeiting his entitlement to his lodgings and making over their contents to her in the event of his vacating his premises for any considerable period. He leaves them for a fortnight's stay in the country, where he is served with a possession order by his landlady's lawyer. On returning home he finds Troubert installed in his apartments, in full possession of his furniture and his library, whilst he himself has been moved into inferior rooms.

Birotteau abandons any prospect of a lawsuit to regain his property, as his friends in the provincial aristocracy of Tours gradually withdraw their backing. In return for giving up his rooms he had expected to be appointed to the vacant canonry of the cathedral. Instead, he is demoted to a much poorer parish two or three miles out of Tours. Deprived of his library and furniture, he leaves Mlle Gamard's, thinking that this will indirectly bring him, through Troubert, the canonry which never comes. Troubert, on the other hand, is first appointed Vicar-General of the diocese of Tours, then Bishop of Troyes, scarcely deigning to look in Birotteau's direction as he speeds past his colleague's dilapidated presbytery on his way to his diocese.

== Fundamental themes of the work ==
(1) The English title The Celibates is more appropriate than The Bachelors in that there are three people in Le Curé de Tours – Birotteau, Troubert and Mlle Gamard – to whom that description applies. All three are unmarried, all lead and have always led sexless lives: all lead “blameless” existences.

(2) The theme of celibacy was important to Balzac, who gave the name Les Célibataires (the original title of Le Curé de Tours) to a sub-section of La Comédie humaine. This sub-section eventually consisted of Pierrette, Le Curé de Tours and La Rabouilleuse. Other works of Balzac in which the theme of celibacy is paramount are Le Cousin Pons, La Cousine Bette and La Vieille Fille (The Old Maid).

(3) Celibacy is to be distinguished from chastity. In Eugénie Grandet, Le Lys dans la vallée and Ursule Mirouët the chastity of the heroines Eugénie, (Mme) Henriette de Mortsauf and Ursule is a dominant theme. Celibacy, even more so than chastity, concentrates and releases immense psychic force. This is a pent-up force which cannot find its outlet in normal sexual relationships.

(4) In the novella Le Curé de Tours the dual themes of celibacy and chastity are interwoven with the processes of the law. In the full-length novels Eugénie Grandet, Ursule Mirouët and Le Cousin Pons these themes of celibacy and chastity are interwoven with the making of wills.

(5) Through sexual abstinence human beings conserve their vital energy: this idea was derived by Balzac from his own father and perhaps also from Rosicrucianism. However, through the excessive self-restraint of celibacy this vital energy can be unleashed with devastating effect. The vital energy of one of the two priests, Birotteau, is expressed in what Balzac describes as his “monomania” for Chapeloud's furniture and library. Troubert's vital energy is focused on his quasi-secular ambition. Sophie Gamard's is focused upon revenge. It is chastity which preserves a human being's equilibrium. This, as in Ursule Mirouët and Le Curé de village, is an aspect of Balzac's Classicism.

(6) Because two of the three celibates are priests, the theme of celibacy is inevitably interwoven with religion. In Le Curé de Tours religion is viewed by Balzac solely in its political dimension. The struggle to restore Birotteau to his apartments is undertaken by well-meaning aristocrats with the aid of a Liberal lawyer. But once Troubert has been appointed Vicar-General of Tours, with the early prospect of becoming a bishop, it becomes clear that he may well have it in his power to thwart young Listomère's promotion in the Navy and the promotion of the latter's uncle to a seat in the Chambre des pairs (Chamber of Peers): so great is the power of the Congrégation of the Roman Catholic Church in France. In the reign of Charles X this politico-religious body is said by Balzac to have wielded a Juggernaut-like destructive influence, holding sway over “the Archbishop, the General, the Prefect, and great and small alike”. And because of its “occult domination” of administrative life the aristocratic families of Tours desert Birotteau, whose personal drama, described as “agony”, is as heart-rending as any drama in the public sphere.

(7) Troubert is bracketed, perhaps somewhat improbably, with Pope Sixtus V, Pope Gregory VII, Pope Alexander VI, Pope Innocent III and Czar Peter the Great of Russia. This is because Balzac believes that the same laws and processes apply at all levels and in all areas of human society.

== Narrative strategies ==
(1) Whereas the presentation of human life as theatre reaches its zenith in Illusions perdues, that of human life as drama is as forceful in Le Curé de Tours as it is in any other fiction of La Comédie humaine.

(2) As in Pierrette, the personal drama of the three celibates in Le Curé de Tours is increasingly interwoven with the politics of their small city. Their drama ceases to be personal and becomes public. The bourgeoisie are pitted against the small aristocracy of the city, and people's attachment to salons is crucial to the story.

(3) A seemingly petty account of the fierce covetousness of three celibates becomes enmeshed within the machinations of the law. Mlle Gamard uses the law in order to achieve an unjust result, and ultimately Birotteau is powerless against it.

(4) Balzac adopts the stance of omniscient narrator. The novella is slow to unfold, presenting the general circumstances in great depth. At the outset of Le Curé de Tours a few words of speech or dialogue are followed by considerable analysis of setting and character. This presentation of setting is important as Balzac's purpose in La Comédie humaine was to describe “men, women and things” and to show the interplay of competing forms of self-interest in his account of the social and political history of contemporary France.

(5) The narrative abounds in generalizations. Balzac invents these adages. The literary form of the apophthegm is essential to his analysis of human character, the workings of human society and the philosophical constitution of the world.

(6) From the dramatic point of view there is much dialogue and much play-acting. Play-acting is a key component of this prevalent use of dialogue. Troubert's encounter with Mme de Listomère epitomizes one of Balzac's recurrent preoccupations, that play-acting is the be-all and end-all of social life, that people say one thing whilst meaning another and that in social life a mask must be worn at all times. In Le Curé de Tours, as nowhere else in La Comédie humaine, Balzac italicizes within brackets what Troubert and Mme de Listomère each mean when they appear to be saying the opposite to one another.

(7) What is said in Le Père Goriot about “the battlefield of Parisian civilisation”, where one has to “kill so as not to be killed, deceive so as not to be deceived”, is as true of Tours as it is of the capital, for Balzac is seeking to establish fundamental social laws.

== Conclusion ==
This apparently unpretentious novella holds the key to so much that was to become important in La Comédie humaine. Balzac is painstakingly concerned with scene-setting, which is not ponderous but exceedingly minute. Increasingly fascinated by dialogue, he is convinced that life is a play. He is awed by the almost volcanic psychological forces which surge within the human heart, especially when they are nurtured by celibacy. All these aspects of his philosophical outlook and narrative technique achieve their culmination in La Cousine Bette and Le Cousin Pons. Written in the earlier days of La Comédie humaine, Le Curé de Tours foreshadows, and helps to shape, the great novels that tower at the very end.

== Bibliography ==
- James J. Baran, « Statues, Statutes and Status in Balzac’s Le Curé de Tours », Journal of Evolutionary Psychology, Aug 1993, n° 14 (3-4), p. 250-9.
- James J. Baran, « The Architecture of Desire in Balzac’s Le Curé de Tours », Degré second, Dec 1992, n° 13, p. 13-20.
- (in French) Anne Bouzigues, « Le Rouge et le Noir et Le Curé de Tours », L'Année balzacienne, 1968, p. 383-98.
- (in French) Émile Danino, « Contrats et castration dans Le Curé de Tours (Balzac) », (Pre)publications, 1980, n° 61, p. 3-13.
- (in French) Hélène Colombani Giaufret, « Balzac linguiste dans Les Célibataires », Studi di storia della civiltà letteraria francese, I-II. Paris, Champion, 1996, p. 695-717.
- (in French) Léon-François Hoffman, « Éros en filigrane : Le Curé de Tours », L’Année balzacienne, Paris, Garnier Frères, 1967, p. 89-105.
- Fredric M. Leeds, « Balzac’s Le Curé de Tours. », Explicator, 1975, n° 34, Item 9.
- (in French) Suzanne Jean-Berard, « Encore la maison du Curé de Tours », L’Année balzacienne, 1968, p. 197-210.
- (in French)Nicole Mozet, « Le Curé de Tours, un espace œdipien? », L’Œuvre d’identité : essais sur le romantisme de Nodier à Baudelaire, Université de Montréal, Département d’Études Françaises, oct 1996, p. 21-27.
- Allan H. Pasco, « The Tangible and the Intangible in Balzac’s Le Curé de Tours », Currencies: Fiscal Fortunes and Cultural Capital in Nineteenth-Century France, Oxford, Peter Lang, 2005, p. 133-45.
- Naomi Schor, « Details and Realism: Le Curé de Tours », Poetics Today, 1984, n° 5 (4), p. 701-09.
- Michael Tilby, « Tours or Dis? Balzac’s Tale of Two Cities (Le Curé de Tours) », Nottingham French Studies, Spring 2007, n° 46 (1), p. 28-46.
- Adeline R. Tintner, « ‘The Old Things’: Balzac's Le Curé de Tours and James's The Spoils of Poynton », Nineteenth-Century Fiction, Mar 1972, n° 26 (4), p. 436-55.
- Dorothy Wirtz, « Animalism in Balzac's Cure de Tours and Pierrette. », Romance Notes, 1969, n° 11, p. 61-7.
- Geof Woollen, « Le Curé de Tours and the Ten Year Itch », French Studies Bulletin, Winter 1988-1989, n° 29, p. 7-9.
