= Honor of the Family =

1931 film

- Directed by: Lloyd Bacon
- Written by: Lenore J. Coffee; James Ashmore Creelman; Roland Pertwee
- Based on: La Rabouilleuse play by Émile Fabre from novel by Balzac
- Starring: Bebe Daniels; Warren William; Alan Mowbray; Frederick Kerr
- Cinematography: Ernest Haller
- Distributed by: First National Pictures: A Subsidiary of Warner Bros. Pictures
- Release date: October 17, 1931
- Running time: 66 minutes
- Country: United States
- Language: English

Honor of the Family is a 1931 American pre-Code drama film released by First National Pictures and starring Bebe Daniels and Warren William. It is based on the play by Emil Fabre from the Honoré de Balzac novel La Rabouilleuse.

The film marked the sound-film debut for William, who would become a major Warner Bros. star over the next five years. It also marked Dita Parlo's first English-speaking role.

== Cast ==
- Bebe Daniels as Laura
- Warren William as Captain Boris Barony
- Alan Mowbray as Tony Revere
- Blanche Friderici as Madame Boris
- Frederick Kerr as Paul Barony
- Dita Parlo as Roszi
- Allan Lane as Joseph
- Harry Cording as Kouski
- Murray Kinnell as Captain Elek
- C. Henry Gordon as Renard
- Carl Miller as Lieutenant Kolman

== Reception ==
In a contemporary review for The New York Times, critic Andre Sennwald summarized Honor of the Family as "an average film, which the not too exacting will find mildly diverting."

== Preservation status ==
Honor of the Family is now considered to be a lost film, with no elements known to exist. The soundtrack, recorded separately on Vitaphone discs, survives.

== See also ==
- List of lost films
