= Donald Adamson =

British literary scholar, author and historian (1939–2024)

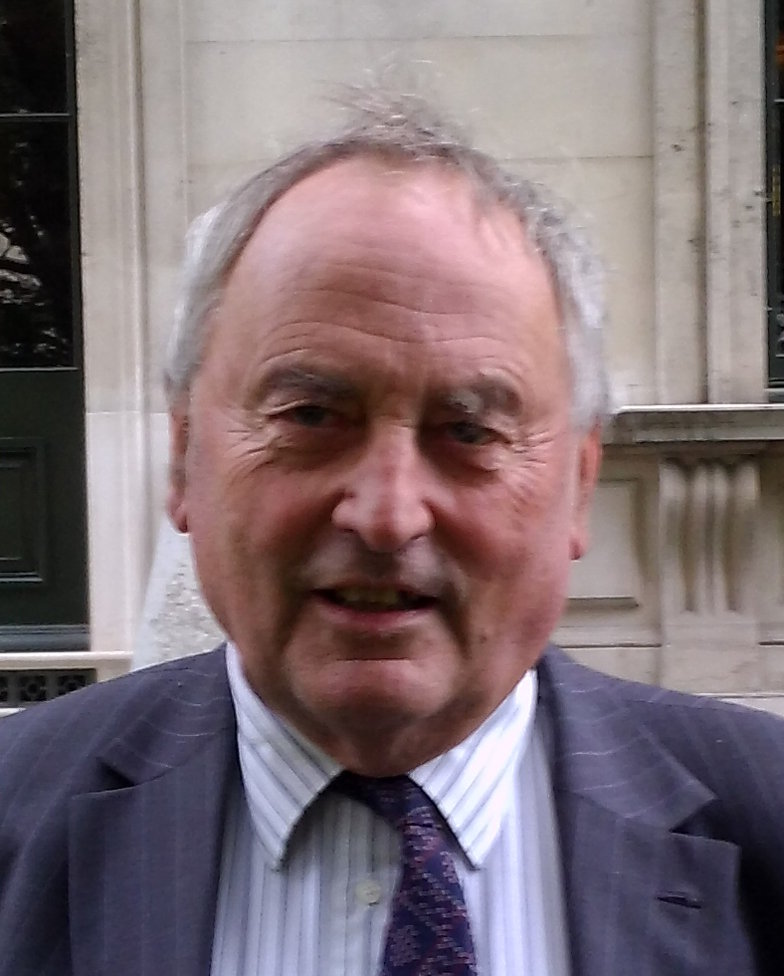
- Born: 30 March 1939; Culcheth, Lancashire, England
- Died: 18 January 2024 (aged 84); Polperro, Cornwall, England
- Education: Magdalen College, Oxford
- Occupations: Author and historian
- Spouse: Helen née Griffiths (m. 1966)
- Children: 2 sons
- Writing career
- Genre: Literary romanticism
- Subjects: History of literature, philosophy and biography
- Notable works: Blaise Pascal: Mathematician, Physicist, and Thinker about God
- Website: www.dodmore.uk

Donald Adamson, JP (30 March 1939 – 18 January 2024), was a British literary scholar and historian.

Adamson wrote books including Blaise Pascal: Mathematician, Physicist, and Thinker about God and Balzac and the Tradition of the European Novel, as well as The Curriers' Company: A Modern History. Adamson's works are regarded as a gateway to European literature.

== Biography ==
Adamson was born at Culcheth in Lancashire to a farming family. His grandfather died when Adamson was two years old, so the family moved to the family farm overlooking the Bridgewater Canal in Lymm, Cheshire. His maternal uncle, and godfather, was Gerald Loxley. His father's family was of Scottish extraction, and a distant cousin was Thomas Adamson.

From 1949 to 1956 he attended Manchester Grammar School where he was taught by, amongst others, Eric James (later Lord James of Rusholme). He became a scholar of Magdalen College, Oxford, and was tutored by Austin Gill and Malcolm Pasley, graduating BA in 1959, proceeding MA in 1963. He won the Zaharoff Travelling Scholar Prize of the University of Oxford for 1959–60, thereafter studying at the Paris-Sorbonne University, being tutored by Pierre-Georges Castex. In 1962 he took the degree of BLitt, proceeding Master of Letters (MLitt); his thesis for the degree of Doctor of Philosophy (DPhil), entitled "Balzac and the Visual Arts", was supervised by Jean Seznec of All Souls College, Oxford.

Adamson spent much of his teaching career at London University, although he taught at Manchester Grammar School from 1962 to 1964 and then at the Lycée Louis-le-Grand from 1964 to 1965. He taught at St George's Church of England School, Gravesend in 1968.

In 1969 he joined Goldsmiths' College. In 1971 he was appointed a teacher in the Faculty of Arts of the University of London and, in 1972, a member of its Faculty of Education, holding both appointments until 1989. He served as chairman of the Board of Examiners at London University from 1983 until 1986. In 2021 he was awarded honorary fellowship of the Chartered Institute of Linguists.

In 1989 he was elected a visiting fellow of Wolfson College, Cambridge, being a promoter in the fields of public policy on the arts, libraries and museums. By speaking, writing and, through the Bow Group, submitting (with John Hannam) written and oral evidence to a Parliamentary select committee, he helped to establish the National Heritage Memorial Fund. Adamson was a member of the judging committee of the Museum of the Year awards from 1979 to 1983, before donating to the National Library of Wales and the National Library of Malta.

Joining the Order of St John in 1981, he became Deputy Director of Ceremonies of the Priory of England and the Islands, serving until 2008.

From 19 October 2012 until 11 October 2013, Adamson served as Master of the Worshipful Company of Curriers of the City of London, then as Senior Court Assistant from 2015, before being awarded Honorary Court Assistantship in 2023. During his term as Master Currier, he endowed The Curriers' Company London History Essay Prize, which is competed for annually by young graduates of British universities; winning essays being published in The London Journal. Adamson stepped down from executive oversight in 2021. Adamson also established sixteen annual prizes in mathematics and history for pupils aged 14 to 15 at four London academies. In 1976 Adamson became a liveryman of the Haberdashers' Company.

His personal interests included the history of religion and genealogy. He was also an enthusiastic art collector, mainly of Western European art, including a work of Eugène Isabey, and drawings of the 18th and 19th centuries.

Adamson and his wife divided their time between homes in Kent and Polperro, Cornwall. He died suddenly in Polperro on 18 January 2024, at the age of 84. A memorial service was held on 15 April 2024 at the Priory Church of St Bartholomew the Great in the City of London.

== Scope of his writing ==
The Genesis of Le Cousin Pons, substantially the text of Adamson's (BLitt) thesis, is a detailed study of the manuscript and proof-sheets of this very late work. Tracing the progress of the novel through its various editions, it reveals the full extent of Balzac's improvisation from novella to full-length masterpiece.

Illusions Perdues, a critical study of what is Balzac's most mature work, outlines its strong autobiographical element, analysing contrasts of Paris and the provinces, the purity of the artist's life and the corruptions of journalism, and the ambiguity of Balzac's narrative outlook. Major themes of the book are that in "fiction" is truth and in "truth" fiction, and that Illusions Perdues is the first novel by any writer to highlight the shaping of public opinion by the media, usually done in the pursuit of power or money.

Blaise Pascal considers its subject from biographical, theological, religious and mathematical points of view, including the standpoint of physics. There is a chapter on the argument of Pascal's wager. The analysis is slightly inclined in a secular direction, giving greater emphasis to Pascal's concern with the contradictions of human nature, and rather less to his deep and traditional preoccupation with original sin. Since writing this book, Adamson has produced further work on Pascal's mathematical comprehension of God.

His historical writings fall into three categories: a monograph on Spanish art and French Romanticism, illuminating the opening-up of Spain and Spanish art to travellers from France and other parts of Western Europe, and to enthusiasts in those countries; articles on manorial and banking history; and, the modern workings of a City of London livery company. Adamson has also written on travel in England and Wales in the 18th century.

Adamson's study of one year in the life of the celebrated artist Oskar Kokoschka has been published to critical acclaim, as have his recollections of Sir William Golding.

== Philosophy of literature ==
According to Adamson, literature does not need to fulfil any social mission or purpose; yet, as with Émile Zola (in Germinal) or D. H. Lawrence, there is every reason why it can highlight social evils. A novel or novella – or a biography – is not merely an absorbing story: in Matthew Arnold's words, the best prose is, like poetry, "a criticism of life". This means that they convey some sort of philosophy of the world (in Arnold's words, "How to live"), though some writers, such as Adalbert Stifter (in Motley Stones) and Jane Austen do this less than most others, whilst on the other hand Samuel Beckett conveys a profoundly negative philosophy of life.

All too often, in Adamson's view, people go through their lives without living or seeking any belief which, for him, is the supreme attractiveness of Blaise Pascal, whose philosophy was of a unique kind: grounded in the vagaries of human nature; not essentially seeking to convince by mathematics; and foreshadowing Søren Kierkegaard and 20th-century existentialism in its appeal to human experience.

== Honours and awards ==
- Knight of Justice, Order of St John of Jerusalem
- Service Medal, Order of St John of Jerusalem (with bar)
- Officier, Ordre des Arts et des Lettres
- Chevalier, Ordre des Palmes académiques
- Cross of Merit, Order pro Merito Melitensi
- Fellow of the Royal Society of Literature
- Fellow of the Royal Historical Society
- Fellow of the Society of Antiquaries of London
- Honorary Fellow of the Chartered Institute of Linguists
- Justice of the Peace of the City of London, and later Cornwall.

=== Arms ===
Coat of arms of Donald Adamson
Crest A Wyvern Azure armed and langued Or in its mouth a Sprig of Laurel Vert Helm That of an Esquire Escutcheon Quarterly, 1st, Vert on a Chevron Argent three Crosses-crosslet fitchées Gules between three Billets Or each charged with a Boar’s Head erect and erased Sable (for Adamson); 2nd, Argent three Boars’ Heads erect and erased Sable langued Gules (for Booth); 3rd, Or a Lion rampant Gules (for Leigh); 4th, Argent a Lion rampant Gules between three Pheons Sable (for Egerton) Motto Tout par Lui, tout pour Lui (Eng: Everything by Him, everything for Him) Orders Behind the Shield, the badge of St John and suspended below, by their respective ribbons, the insignia of the orders of Palmes académiques, Arts et Lettres and pro Merito Melitensi Other elements As Master Currier, Dr Adamson could impale the Curriers' arms (dexter) with his family arms (sinister)

== Bibliography ==
Adamson wrote an account of his own life, including his friendship with A.L. Rowse, with excerpts of the latter's correspondence. Adamson wrote eleven books as well as numerous articles.

=== Books ===
- 1966: The Genesis of "Le Cousin Pons"
- 1971: Dusty Heritage
- 1971: T. S. Eliot: a Memoir by Robert Sencourt (ed.)
- 1974: The House of Nell Gwyn: the fortunes of the Beauclerk family, 1670-1974 (jointly with Peter Beauclerk Dewar)
- 1980: A Rescue Policy for Museums
- 1981: Balzac: Illusions Perdues
- 1988: Les Romantiques français devant la peinture espagnole
  - (1990: republished as Interprètes français de la peinture espagnole à l'époque romantique)
- 1995: Blaise Pascal: mathematician, physicist, and thinker about God
- 1996: Rides Round Britain: the travel journals of John Byng (ed.)
- 2000: The Curriers' Company: a Modern History
- 2001: Balzac and the Tradition of the European Novel

=== Translations ===
- 1970: The Black Sheep (trans. Balzac's La Rabouilleuse)
- 1976: Ursule Mirouët (trans. Balzac), 2nd edn 2015
- 1993: Bed 29 & Other Stories: an anthology of 26 of Maupassant's short stories

=== Other works ===
- 1972: Stendhal and Balzac as Connoisseurs of Italian Art
- 1982: Child's Bank and Oxford University in the Eighteenth Century
- 1989: The Priest in Balzac's Fiction: Secular and Sacred Aspects of the Church
- 1991: Old Goriot presented in Everyman Books
- 1992: La Réception de la Comédie humaine en Grande-Bretagne au XX^{e} siècle
- 2005: Pascal's Views on Mathematics and the Divine
- 2009: Oskar Kokoschka at Polperro
- 2010: William Golding Remembered
- 2010: Researching Kokoschka
- 2010: A Passage from Barcelona
- 2011: St John in Cornwall
- 2012: Meeting A.L. Rowse (this, somewhat modified, is one of the fifteen chapters of his unfinished book on A.L. Rowse)
- 2013: Frank Heath, Artist of Polperro and Lamorna
- 2014: Belonging to the Curriers' Company
- 2014: A Year with the Curriers' Company, Part I
- 2014: A Year with the Curriers' Company, Part II
- 2014: Rowse and Trevor-Roper defined
- 2014: Malta, its Knights and Grand Masters: Part I
- 2015: Malta, its Knights and Grand Masters: Part II
- 2015: In Memoriam: Raleigh Trevelyan
- 2015: Cyprus: An Essay
- 2015: Serendipity
- 2016: A Visit to Venice
- 2016: A Visit to Provence and Languedoc
- 2016: The Godolphins
- 2017: The Dukes of Leeds
- 2017: Elba: Two Centuries On
- 2018: Napoleon at Elba

Preceded by Peter France	Oxford University; Zaharoff Prize; 1959 - 1960	Succeeded by William Bell
