= Ursule Mirouët =

1841 novel by Honoré de Balzac

Ursule Mirouet
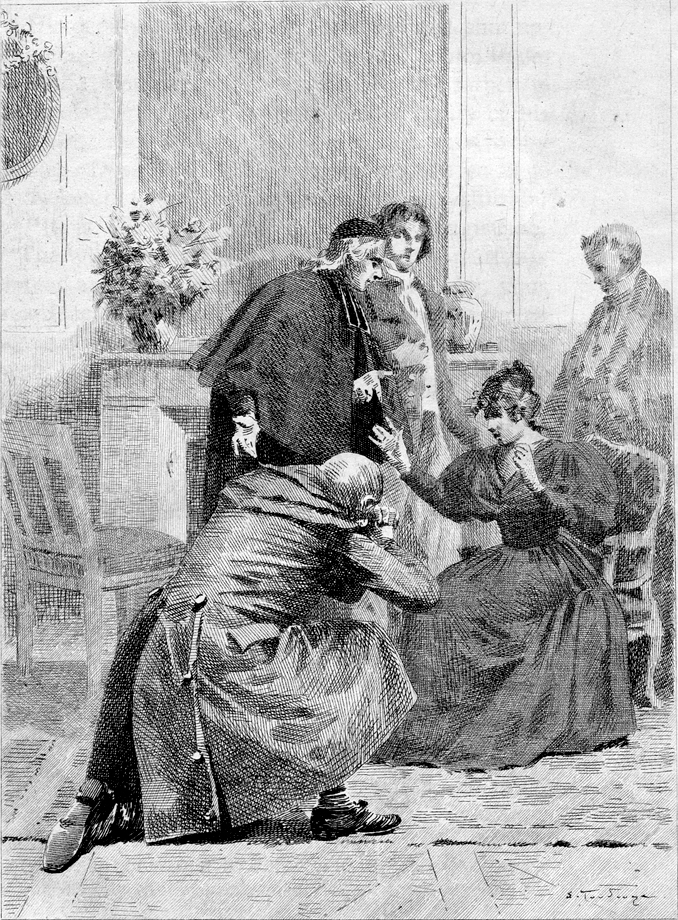
- Title page of Honoré de Balzac's Ursule Mirouët. From 1897 edition of Ursule Mirouët.
- Author: Honoré de Balzac
- Illustrator: Édouard Toudouze
- Language: French
- Series: La Comédie humaine
- Genre: Fiction
- Publication date: 1841
- Publication place: France
- Media type: Print

Ursule Mirouët, a novel, belongs to Honoré de Balzac’s series of 94 novels and short stories La Comédie humaine. First published in 1841, it forms part of his Scènes de la vie de province.

The action of the novel takes place in Nemours, though with flashbacks to Paris. It is set in the years 1829–1837.

== Plot summary ==
Ursule is the legitimate daughter of the widower Dr Denis Minoret’s deceased illegitimate brother-in-law by marriage, Joseph Mirouët; not only is she the doctor’s niece, she is also his goddaughter and ward. Fifteen years old when the novel begins, she has been brought up by the doctor. Dr Minoret, an atheist rather than an agnostic, and a devoted student of the Encyclopédie, has persisted in his rationalistic atheism for most of his eighty-three years. At the beginning of the novel he is, however, converted to Christianity – emotionally by the example of Ursule’s piety, and intellectually by his experience of animal magnetism, or the paranormal, and by his longstanding friendship with Abbé Chaperon.

Dr Minoret is determined that Ursule shall inherit all the savings he has accumulated during his lifetime. He intends, on the other hand, to bequeath the remainder (approximately half) of his total fortune of about 1,500,000 francs to his “héritiers”, nephews and cousins of his own bloodline who are members of the Minoret, Crémière and Massin families.

Discontented with their inheritance prospects, the “heirs” seek to grab the whole of their wealthy relative's fortune, enlisting the help of the notary's clerk Goupil. The doctor conceals a letter of testamentary intention in a legal volume in his library. This, together with three bearer bonds, is stolen by one of the doctor's nephews, the postmaster François Minoret-Levrault, who, in the era before railways, owns and manages the carriage and postchaise services in and out of Nemours.

The doctor dies, leaving Ursule much poorer than he had intended, for her inheritance would have become her dowry. Despite their best efforts – ransacking all the books in his library – the “heirs” (or “family”) cannot find the clue to the money. But remorse strikes Minoret-Levrault, and the doctor, appearing to him in a vision, instructs him to make good his theft. By an act of poetic justice the postmaster's dandyish son Désiré Minoret-Levrault is killed in a stagecoach accident. Ursule marries the man of her dreams, the young Army officer Viscount Savinien de Portenduère.

== Fundamental themes of the work ==
=== Virtue ===
Ursule is conspicuously virtuous, and Balzac was acutely aware of the difficulty of presenting a virtuous heroine in a novel. “Goodness has just one form, evil has a thousand”, he believed: “to be able to portray many virgins, you need to be like Raphael” He hoped that Ursule Mirouët would win the annual Prix Montyon for the book which had rendered the greatest service to mankind; but in this he was disappointed.

According to Balzac in his Avant-propos (Foreword) to La Comédie humaine, it is in capital cities that “the extremes of good and evil are to be found”. However, the extreme polarization of good and evil in this novel is to be found in the provinces.

=== Inheritance and the Law ===
Ursule Mirouët is the second of Balzac's four inheritance novels (i.e., Eugénie Grandet, Ursule Mirouët, La Rabouilleuse and Le Cousin Pons). As in all of the first three of these novels, the struggle for the inheritance is played out in a provincial town.

In no other inheritance novel of La Comédie humaine are the complexities of French inheritance law so coolly and analytically explored, and never more so than when the notary's clerk Goupil explains the inheritance situation to the “heirs”. Legally speaking, Ursule Mirouët is no relation whatever of Dr Minoret: this is in stark contrast to the emotional situation, where she is everything to him! There is therefore no possibility that Ursule could obtain the whole of Dr Minoret's wealth – unless, at nineteen years of age, she were to marry the eighty-seven-year-old doctor, which, as he is neither a blood relation of hers nor any sort of relation in law, he could legally do: and this is what the “heirs” fear.

Dr Minoret is moved by a profound sense of natural justice. For this reason he rules out any thought of a marriage of convenience with Ursule. And it is implied by Balzac that this sense of natural justice was just as strong within him in the days when he was an atheist.

Furthermore, though the law can be manipulated by calculating people for their own self-advancement, it does roughly approximate to justice. Désiré Minoret-Levrault, a lawyer himself, realizes this. Balzac, in Ursule Mirouët, seems to be of the opinion that justice “has a power of omniscience, a collective memory and a capacity for eventual action which far transcend the law’s imperfect machinery” – though allowance should be made for free indirect discourse. Nowhere else in La Comédie humaine is this opinion so categorically stated.

=== The Supernatural ===
Ursule Mirouët embodies important philosophical statements of Balzac's view of life, in particular his belief in Mesmer’s theory of animal magnetism. Through Dr Minoret's experience of the occult, his séance with the mysterious hypnotist and the elderly female medium, he becomes a Christian believer: here in La Comédie humaine the finite is seen as being embedded within the infinite; animal magnetism underpins a belief in God. Balzac views Dr Minoret's rejection of religious indifference as the necessary accompaniment of his rejection of his earlier denial of animal magnetism.

Not only is Dr Minoret converted to Christianity by a séance, he also makes five dream-like appearances from the dead; and the supernatural also seems to intervene in the fatal accident that befalls Désiré Minoret-Levrault. It is because of this supernatural, cosmic dimension that – very unusually for Balzac's novels – Ursule Mirouët has a happy ending. It is one of the most joyful of his novels.

== Narrative strategies ==
(1) The novel is notable for its use of the in medias res technique. Opening with François Minoret-Levrault anxiously awaiting his son Désiré's return home, it then turns to the circumstances leading up to that moment.

(2) There is in fact a double employment of this flashback technique as shortly afterwards, to the town's amazement, Dr Minoret is shown walking to church with Ursule. The novel then proceeds to outline Dr Minoret's life up to that point.

(3) The influence of the roman-feuilleton (serial (literature)) is very noticeable. Leading feuilletonistes were Eugène Sue, Alexandre Dumas, père, Paul Féval, père, Frédéric Soulié and Eugène Scribe. Balzac became increasingly preoccupied by their popularity in the 1840s and tried to emulate them. This involved incorporating many features of melodrama; thus, for example, the séance is high melodrama. Serialization also encouraged the ending of each serialized extract on a note of high suspense.

(4) There is a strong ludic element in Ursule Mirouët. For Goupil the law is nothing but a game the aim of which is to outwit and defeat one's opponents. Melodrama also has a ludic dimension as Balzac conjures into and out of existence the visionary beings who assist the progress of the plot. He thus juggles with the different levels of reality – the normal and the paranormal – as if he were playing with a kaleidoscope. At the level of language this juggling is mirrored in Goupil's puns and Mme Crémière's slips of the tongue.

(5) The narrative of Ursule Mirouët is essentially simple in conception. It is, according to Donald Adamson, “a story in which no violent collision between the characters [arises]”. Flashbacks apart, Ursule Mirouët has a straightforward storyline, with no sub-plots. Nevertheless, because of the flashbacks, it is a work of great narrative intricacy. Thus, with its stagecoach element, Désiré Minoret-Levrault's death strikingly parallels the opening scene of the novel.

== Conclusion ==
Although André Gide regarded Ursule Mirouët as a fairly minor work by Balzac's standards, Balzac himself described it as the masterpiece of all the studies of human society he had written up to that date. There is an air of serenity about this novel which La Comédie humaine seldom achieves; and this despite the elements of melodrama and class conflict. The skirmishings to obtain the inheritance are admirably represented, as in a tableau, by the scene at the auction of Dr Minoret's belongings, where the “heirs” tip upside down and shake every volume in his library in their efforts to find the missing fortune. This turmoil is in a sense the Romantic dimension of the novel. Yet the dominant tone of Ursule Mirouët is projected at the very outset of the work, when Balzac compares its Nemours setting to the beauty and simplicity of a seventeenth-century Dutch landscape painting. Ursule Mirouët has that “noble simplicity, and ... tranquil greatness” which, in Winckelmann’s words, were the defining characteristics of Classicism.

== Bibliography ==
- Honoré de Balzac, Ursule Mirouet, 2 vols, Paris: Souverain, 1842
- Honoré de Balzac, La Comédie humaine, vol. V, Paris: Furne, 1843 (Scènes de la vie de province, vol. I)
- Ursule Mirouët, translated by Donald Adamson, Penguin Classics (Harmondsworth: 1976)
- Donald Adamson, translator's introduction, Ursule Mirouët, Penguin Classics(Harmondsworth: 1976), pp. 5–19
- Claudine Bernard, “La Dynamique familiale dans Ursule Mirouët de Balzac”, French Forum, May 1999, pp. 179–202
- André Gide, Journal, 1889–1939, Paris: Gallimard, 1951
- René Guise, “Balzac et le roman-feuilleton”, Année balzacienne, 1964, pp. 283–338
- Jean Homayoun Mazahéri, “La Conversion du Dr Minoret dans Ursule Mirouët de Balzac”, Lettres romanes, February–May 2001, pp. 53–66
- Armine Kotin Mortimer, “Balzac’s Ursule Mirouët: Genealogy and Inheritance”, Modern Language Review, October 1997, pp. 851–63
- Michel Nathan, “Religion et roman: À Propos de Ursule Mirouët”, in Balzac: l’Invention du roman (Paris: Belfond, 1982), pp. 85–98
- Michael Tilby, “Balzac’s Magnetic Saints: A Note on Ursule Mirouët”, French Studies Bulletin, summer 2005, pp. 12–15
