= Worshipful Company of Curriers =

Livery company of the City of London

Coordinates: 51.51136°N 0.09108°W

Curriers' Company
- Motto: Spes Nostra Deus
- Location: c/o Tallow Chandlers' Hall, Dowgate Hill, London
- Date of formation: 1272
- Company association: Leather, fashion and education
- Order of precedence: 29th
- Master of company: Piers Williamson
- Website: curriers.co.uk

The Worshipful Company of Curriers is one of the ancient livery companies of London, associated with the leather trade.

The curriers, or "curers of leather", of London formed an organisation in 1272; this merchant guild was recognised in 1415 by Ordinances of the City Common Council before its grant of a Royal Charter by King James I in 1605. The company now exists, as do most other livery companies, as an education and charitable institution, the traditional process of currying having been made more or less obsolete by technological advances. The Curriers' Company, like other livery companies, supports the work of the Lord Mayor, the City Corporation and the Sheriffs of London.

The company ranks 29th in the order of precedence of City livery companies. Its motto is Spes Nostra Deus, Latin for "Our Hope is God".

Most of the Curriers' Company archives are kept at the Guildhall Library for public view.

== History ==
The Curriers' Company dates from 1272 when the Art or Mystery of Curriers formed a trade association with the tanners. In the 14th century the Curriers constituted themselves into a guild linked with the Carmelite Friars near Fleet Street. In 1415 the City Common Council granted them full autonomy over all currying and tanning trade in and within two miles of the city. Before 1580 the Guild of Curriers was recognised as a City livery company and became armigerous in 1583, although, not until 1605 did the Curriers' Company receive its Royal Charter of Incorporation from King James I.

During the ensuing four centuries the company built no less than six Curriers' halls in London. After the sale of its sixth and last hall in 1921 it moved in with its longstanding trade and livery partner, the Worshipful Company of Cordwainers, with which it maintains a close relationship. Along with many other livery halls, Cordwainers' Hall in Cannon Street was itself destroyed by enemy action in 1941 and since then the Curriers have been without their own hall. However, from 1942 onwards the company has been housed at Tallow Chandlers' Hall, where it holds its Court meetings. Historically several streets in the now London Borough of Camden's environs were named after the currying trade, eg. Curriers' Alley, Curriers' Lane, etc.

== Charitable activity ==
The Curriers' Company donates to charities which benefit the young, the elderly, the disabled and the socially disadvantaged. It primarily supports City of London charities and cultural organisations, general educational establishments and the training of young people in leathercraft.

The educational institutions which it regularly assists financially include: the London College of Fashion; Capel Manor College Enfield and Northampton University's Leather Conservation Centre; these foster the conservation, creation and restoration of leather objects and materials. In 2000 the Curriers' Millennium Healthcare Bursary was established. This annual bursary endows research or personal study to improve the health care of underprivileged sectors of London's population or elsewhere. Though originally directed towards general practitioners, the scope of the bursary was widened in 2003, since when it has also attracted submissions from dentists, pharmacists, nurses, midwives, mental health workers and an ophthalmologist.

The Curriers' Company London History Essay Prize on the history of London is competed for by young graduates of British universities; endowed by Donald Adamson (Master Currier, 2012/13), it is assessed by the Institute of Historical Research and presented annually by the Lord Mayor. The Company also presents 16 annual prizes in mathematics and history for pupils aged 14 to 15 at the four London academies of the Oasis Trust.

Annually, each newly elected Master Currier has the option of designating a charity of choice: Master's Charitable Appeal. The Master and Company make initial donations: liverymen, freemen and others are invited to follow suit. The Company encourages any enterprise which supports its charitable giving.

The Curriers' Company is affiliated to military units in the British Armed Forces: 101 (City of London) Engineer Regiment (Explosive Ordnance Disposal); No. 7 Squadron RAF; and, Cambridge URNU.

The present Clerk to the Curriers' Company is former diplomat Giles Whitaker, whose role combines that of executive officer as well as supporting the Master: Piers Williamson (for 2024/25). The Company's Honorary Chaplain is Roger Preece.

== Notable liverymen ==
- Sir Carl Aarvold
- Dr Donald Adamson
- Henry Spencer Ashbee
- Judge Brian Barker
- John Belcher
- Norman Birkett, 1st Baron Birkett
- Peter Cadbury
- Sir Oliver Chesterton
- Thomas Dewar, 1st Baron Dewar
- Gordon Hewart, 1st Viscount Hewart
- George Jarvis, founder of Jarvis plc
- Francis Jeune, 1st Baron Saint Helier
- Sir Richard Jolly
- The Earl Jowitt
- David Lloyd George, 1st Earl Lloyd-George of Dwyfor
- Sir Robert Lush
- John Maberly, MP
- John Rylands
- Sir Frank Sanderson, Bt
- Sir Philip Shelbourne
- Sir Lawrence Verney
- Sir Godfrey Russell-Vick

== Former halls ==
(1) In 1485 the Curriers' Company had its hall in the parish of St Mary Axe, by London Wall in Aldgate Ward.

(2) Circa 1583 the Curriers' Hall was situated close to the site of the Boar's Head Inn, on a property which had been devised to the company in 1516. It stood in the parish of St Alphege, on the south side of the street leading along London Wall; Boar's Head Alley lay between Philip Lane and Little Wood Street. Curriers' Hall was one of the 44 (out of 52) livery halls destroyed in the Great Fire of London early in September 1666.

(3) Curriers' Hall in 1670 was perhaps the most attractive of the company's five halls on the Boar's Head site.

(4) In 1820 a new and smaller hall was rebuilt to the east of the old one.

(5) The Curriers' Hall begun in 1873 and completed in the following year extravagantly was demolished in 1875 before it could even be furnished.

(6) Between 1874 and 1876 a new Curriers' Hall was built in the French Gothic style. It abutted on London Wall. It was sold in 1921 and destroyed by enemy action on 29 December 1940.

=== Arms ===
The arms of the Curriers' Company are blazoned:- Arms: Azure a Cross engrailed Or between four pairs of Shaves in saltire Argent handled Or.

Crest: Upon a Wreath Or and Azure out of Clouds Proper two Arms embowed in carnation the shirt sleeves folded beneath the elbows Argent in the hands a Shave Argent handled Or.

Supporters: Dexter, an Elk Proper attired and unguled Or; Sinister, a Goat Argent flashed Sable.

The Company's armorial bearings were granted on 8 August 1583.

== See also ==
- Crispin and Crispinian
