= Cromwell (tragedy) =

Unpublished verse tragedy by Honoré de Balzac

Cromwell is an unpublished 1820 verse tragedy by Honoré de Balzac.

It was Balzac's first work as an author, when he decided to quit his career as a solicitor to become an independent writer. That decision displeased his mother, who agreed to give him the bare minimum of money to live on his own, in order to discourage him to follow the path of literature. When the tragedy was finished, it was reviewed by a professor named Andrieux, the former tutor of Eugène de Surville, Balzac's step brother. On the manuscript, Andrieux wrote: "The author should do anything he likes, but not literature."

In 1926, the professor Walter Scott Hastings of Princeton University discovered a copy of the manuscript, and subsequently had it published.

== Bibliography ==
- Robb, Graham (1994). Balzac: A Biography. New York: W. W. Norton & Company. ISBN 0-393-03679-0.
- Zweig, Stefan (1950). Balzac. Librairie générale française. ISBN 9782253139256.
