= Honoré de Balzac =

French novelist and playwright (1799–1850)

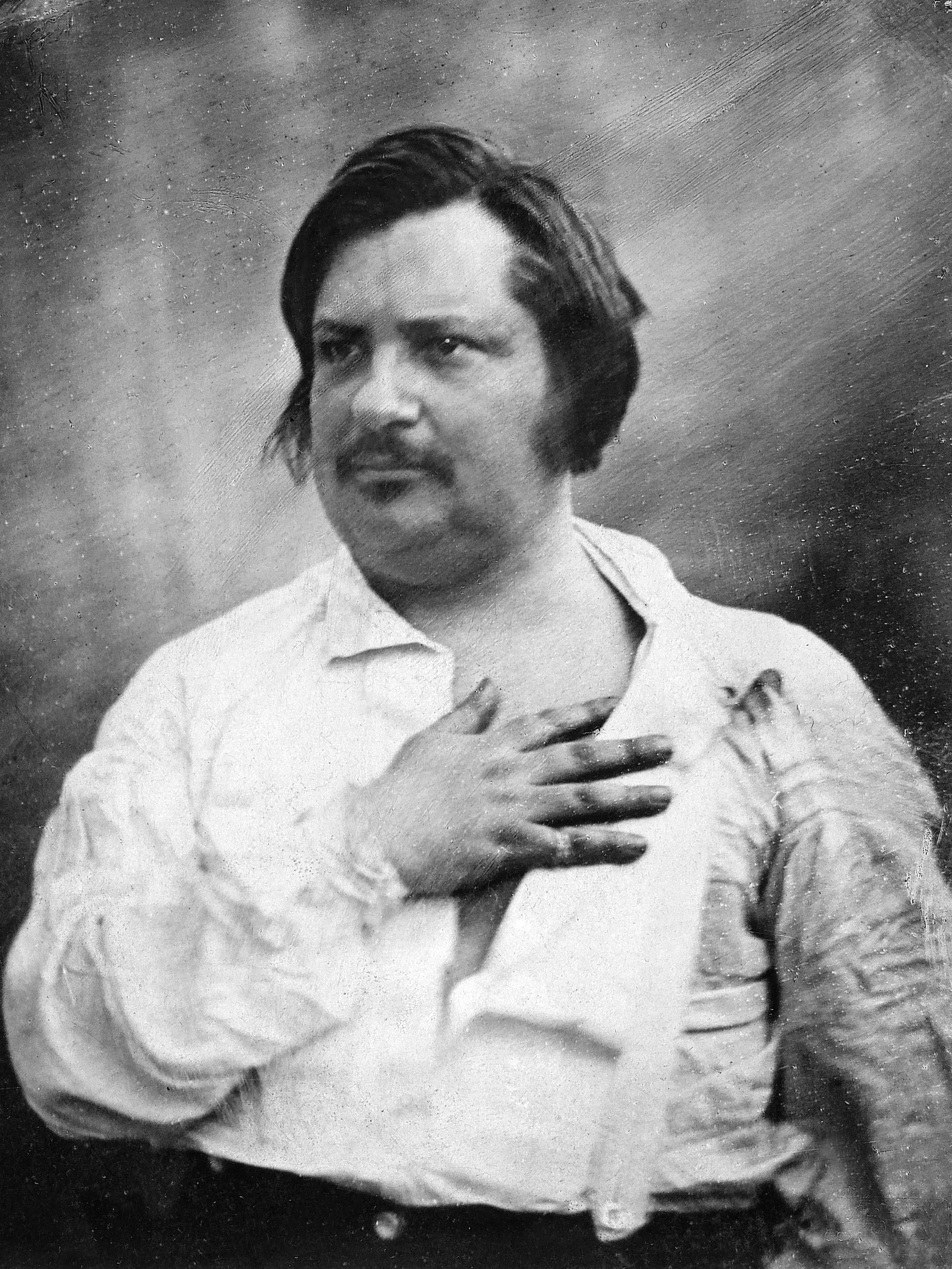
- Revised daguerreotype taken in 1842
- Born: Honoré Balzac; 20 May 1799; Tours, Touraine, France
- Died: 18 August 1850 (aged 51); Paris, France
- Resting place: Père Lachaise Cemetery
- Education: University of Paris
- Occupations: Writer; critic; journalist; printer
- Spouse: Ewelina Hańska (m. 1850)
- Writing career
- Years active: 1829–1850
- Genres: Novel; drama; essay
- Notable work: La Comédie humaine
- Notable awards: Chevalier of the Legion of Honour (1845)
- Movement: Realism

Honoré de Balzac (/ˈbælzæk/ BAL-zak, also US: /ˈbɔːl-/ BAWL-; French: [ɔnɔʁe d(ə) balzak]; born Honoré Balzac; 20 May 1799 – 18 August 1850) was a French novelist and playwright. The novel sequence La Comédie humaine, described as a panorama of post-Napoleonic French life, is generally viewed as his magnum opus.

Due to his keen observation of detail and unfiltered representation of society, Balzac is regarded as one of the founders of realism in European literature. He is renowned for his multi-faceted characters; even his lesser characters are complex, morally ambiguous and fully human. Inanimate objects are imbued with character as well; the city of Paris, a backdrop for much of his writing, takes on many human qualities. His writing influenced many famous writers, including the novelists Émile Zola, Charles Dickens, Marcel Proust, Gustave Flaubert, Henry James and Fyodor Dostoevsky, and filmmakers François Truffaut and Jacques Rivette. Many of Balzac's works have been made into films and his work has served as a framework for other writers. James called him "really the father of us all."

== Biography ==
Honoré de Balzac was born on 20 May 1799 to Bernard-François Balssa and Anne-Charlotte-Laure Sallambier. He was the second child born to the Balzacs: exactly one year earlier Louis-Daniel had been born, but he lived for only a month. Honoré's sisters, Laure and Laurence, were born in 1800 and 1802 and his younger brother, Henry-François, in 1807.

=== Early life ===
As an infant, Balzac was sent to a wet nurse; the following year he was joined by his sister Laure and they spent four years away from home. (Although Genevan philosopher Jean-Jacques Rousseau's influential book Émile persuaded many mothers of the time to nurse their own children, sending babies to wet nurses was still common among the middle and upper classes.) When the Balzac children returned home, they were kept at a frosty distance from their parents, which affected the author-to-be significantly. His 1835 novel Le Lys dans la vallée features a cruel governess named Miss Caroline, modelled after his own caregiver.

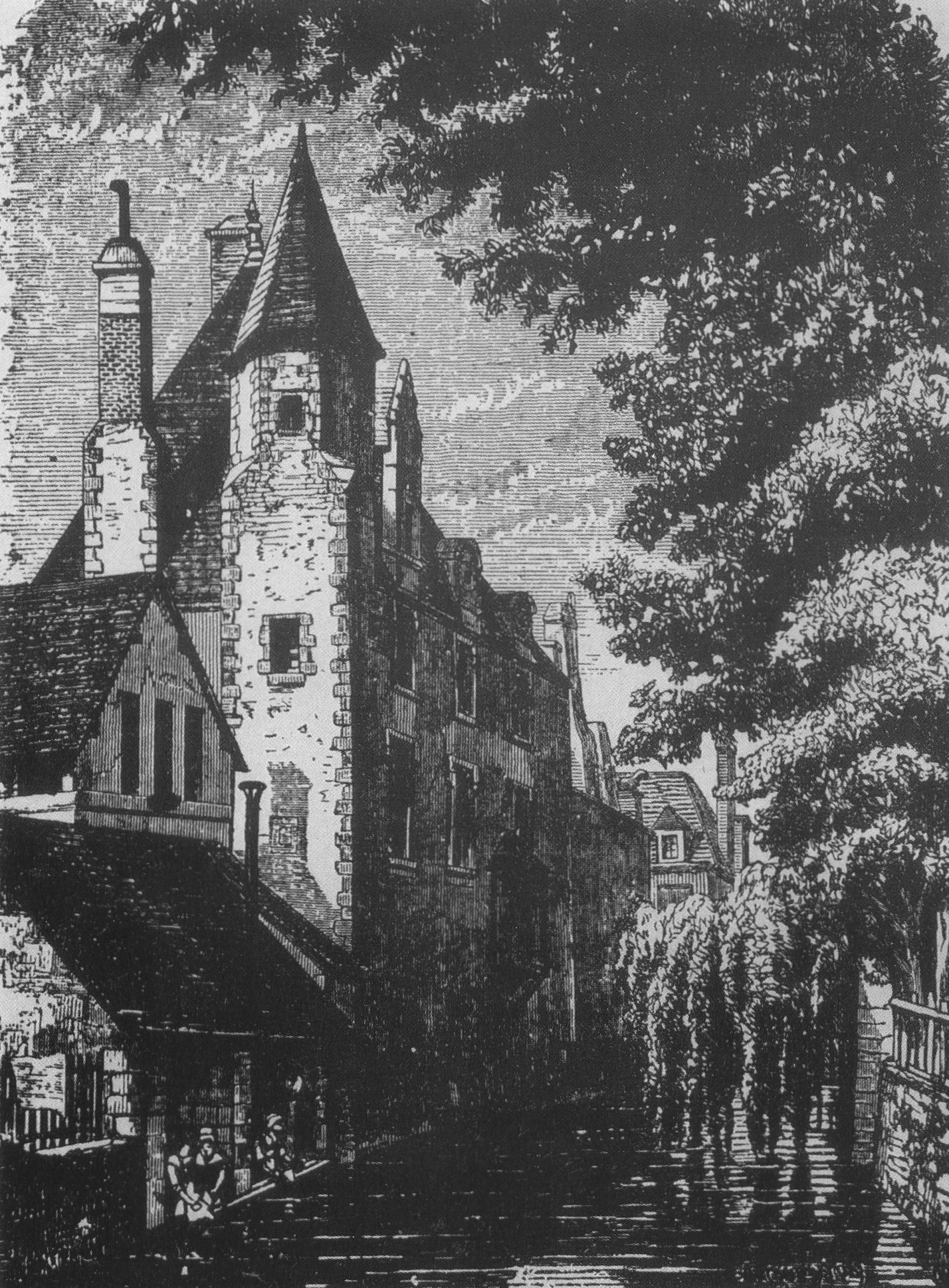
Vendôme Oratory School – engraving by Armand Queyroy

At the age of ten, Balzac was sent to the Oratorian grammar school in Vendôme, where he studied for seven years. His father, seeking to instill the same hardscrabble work ethic that had gained him the esteem of society, intentionally gave little spending money to the boy. This made him the object of ridicule among his much wealthier schoolmates.

Balzac had difficulty adapting to the rote style of learning at the school. As a result, he was frequently sent to the "alcove", a punishment cell reserved for disobedient students. (The janitor at the school, when asked later if he remembered Honoré, replied: "Remember M. Balzac? I should think I do! I had the honour of escorting him to the dungeon more than a hundred times!") Still, his time alone gave the boy ample freedom to read every book that came his way.

Balzac worked these scenes from his boyhood—as he did many aspects of his life and the lives of those around him—into La Comédie humaine. His time at Vendôme is reflected in Louis Lambert, his 1832 novel about a young boy studying at an Oratorian grammar school at Vendôme. The narrator says: "He devoured books of every kind, feeding indiscriminately on religious works, history and literature, philosophy and physics. He had told me that he found indescribable delight in reading dictionaries for lack of other books."

Balzac often fell ill, finally causing the headmaster to contact his family with news of a "sort of a coma". When he returned home, his grandmother said: "Voilà donc comme le collège nous renvoie les jolis que nous lui envoyons!" ("Look how the academy returns the pretty ones we send them!") Balzac himself attributed his condition to "intellectual congestion", but his extended confinement in the "alcove" was surely a factor. (Meanwhile, his father had been writing a treatise on "the means of preventing thefts and murders, and of restoring the men who commit them to a useful role in society", in which he heaped disdain on prison as a form of crime prevention.)

In 1814, the Balzac family moved to Paris, and Honoré was sent to private tutors and schools for the next two and a half years. During this time, he attempted suicide on a bridge over the river Loire.

In 1816, Balzac entered the Sorbonne, where he studied under François Guizot, who later became Prime Minister, was Professor of Modern History; Abel-François Villemain, a recent arrival from the Collège Charlemagne, lectured on French and classical literature; and Victor Cousin's courses on philosophy encouraged his students to think independently.

Once his studies were completed, Balzac was persuaded by his father to follow him into the Law; after a stint in the office of the avoué Jean-Baptiste Guillonnet-Merville for three years he trained and worked at the office of the notary Édouard-Victor Passez, a family friend. During this time, Balzac began to understand the vagaries of human nature. In his 1840 novel Le Notaire, he wrote that a young person in the legal profession sees "the oily wheels of every fortune, the hideous wrangling of heirs over corpses not yet cold, the human heart grappling with the Penal Code".

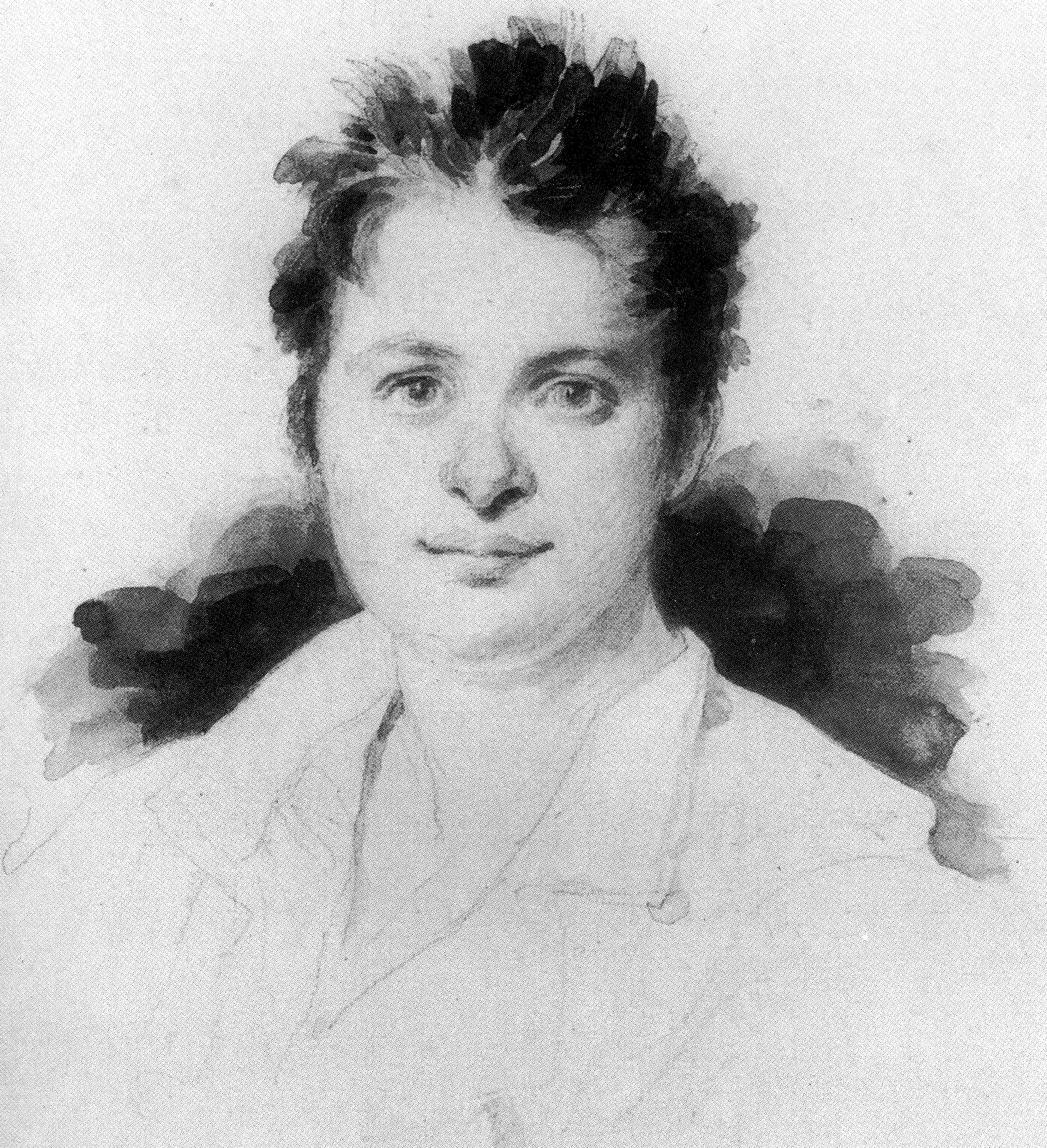
Drawing of Balzac in the mid-1820s, attributed to Achille Devéria

In 1819, Passez offered to make Balzac his successor, but his apprentice had had enough of the Law. He despaired of being "a clerk, a machine, a riding-school hack, eating and drinking and sleeping at fixed hours. I should be like everyone else. And that's what they call living, that life at the grindstone, doing the same thing over and over again.... I am hungry and nothing is offered to appease my appetite". He announced his intention to become a writer.

The loss of this opportunity caused serious discord in the Balzac household, although Honoré was not turned away entirely. Instead, in April 1819, he moved to the French capital—as English critic George Saintsbury describes it—"in a garret furnished in the most Spartan fashion, with a starvation allowance and an old woman to look after him", while the rest of the family moved to a house twenty miles (32 km) outside Paris.

=== First literary efforts ===
Balzac's first project was a libretto for a comic opera called Le Corsaire, based on Lord Byron's The Corsair. Following difficulties sourcing a composer, he turned to other pursuits.

In 1820, Balzac completed the five-act verse tragedy Cromwell. While considered a work of lower quality in comparison to later published work, some critics consider it a good-quality text. When he finished, Balzac went to Villeparisis and read the entire work to his family; they were unimpressed. He followed this effort by starting (but never finishing) three novels: Sténie, Falthurne, and Corsino.

In 1821, Balzac met Auguste Le Poitevin, who convinced the author to write short stories, which Le Poitevin would then sell to publishers. Balzac turned to longer works, and by 1826 he had written nine novels, all published under pseudonyms and often produced in collaboration with other writers. For example, the novel Vicaire des Ardennes (1822)—banned for its depiction of nearly-incestuous relations and, more egregiously, of a married priest—attributed to a "Horace de Saint-Aubin". These books were potboiler novels, designed to sell quickly and titillate audiences. In Saintsbury's view, "they are curiously, interestingly, almost enthrallingly bad". Saintsbury indicates that Robert Louis Stevenson tried to dissuade him from reading these early works of Balzac. American critic Samuel Rogers, however, notes that "without the training they gave Balzac, as he groped his way to his mature conception of the novel, and without the habit he formed as a young man of writing under pressure, one can hardly imagine his producing La Comédie humaine". Biographer Graham Robb suggests that as he discovered the Novel, Balzac discovered himself.

During this time, Balzac wrote two pamphlets in support of primogeniture and the Society of Jesus. The latter, regarding the Jesuits, illustrated his lifelong admiration for the Catholic Church. In the preface to La Comédie humaine he wrote: "Christianity, above all, Catholicism, being ... a complete system for the repression of the depraved tendencies of man, is the most powerful element of social order".

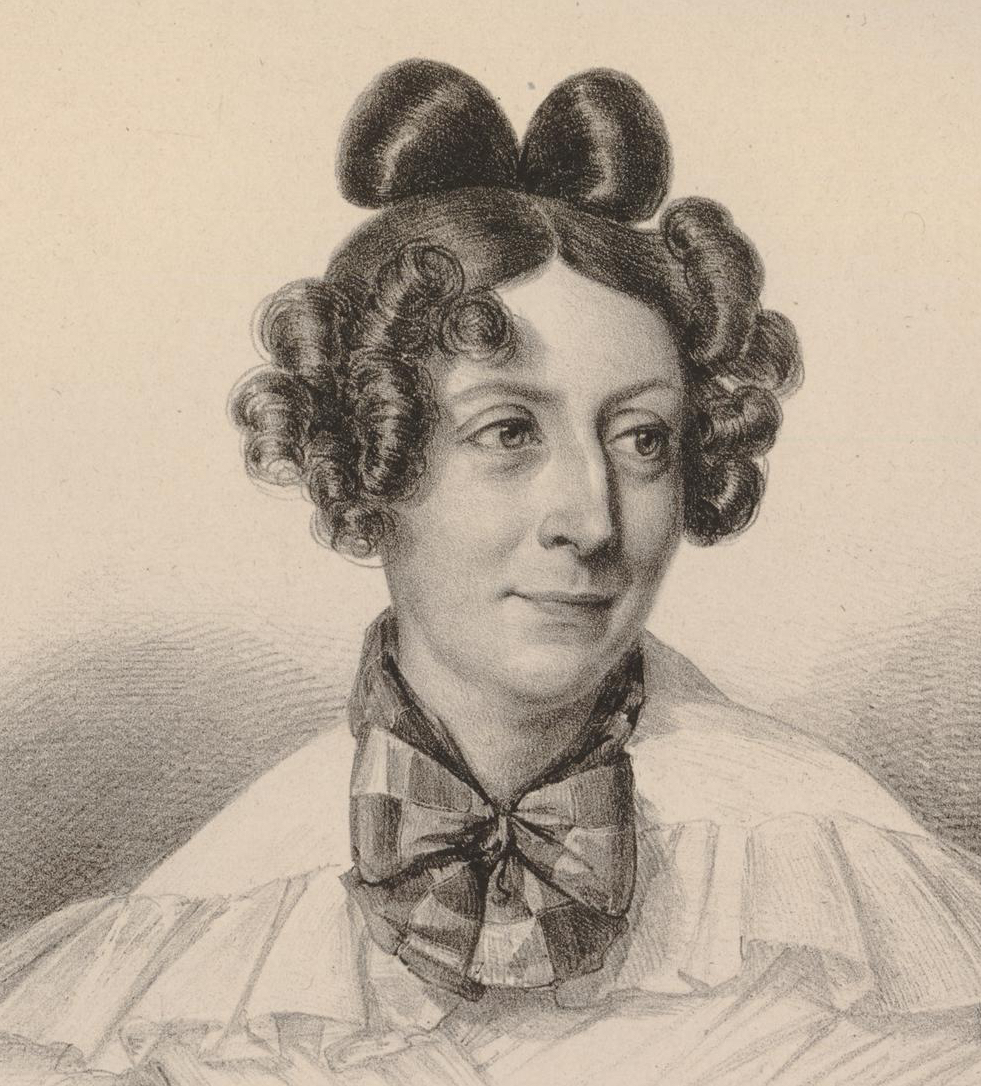
Laure Junot, Duchess of Abrantès

=== "Une bonne spéculation" ===
In the late 1820s, Balzac dabbled in several business ventures, a penchant his sister blamed on the temptation of an unknown neighbour. His first enterprise was in publishing which turned out cheap one-volume editions of French classics including the works of Molière. This business failed miserably, with many of the books "sold as waste paper". Balzac had better luck publishing the Memoirs of the Duchess of Abrantès, with whom he also had a love affair.

Balzac borrowed money from his family and friends and tried to build a printing business, then a type foundry. His inexperience and lack of capital caused his ruin in these trades. He gave the businesses to a friend (who made them successful) but carried the debts for many years. As of April 1828 Balzac owed 50,000 francs to his mother.

Balzac had a penchant for une bonne spéculation. He travelled to Sardinia in the hopes of reprocessing the slag from the Roman mines there. Near the end of his life, Balzac was captivated by the idea of cutting 20,000 acres (81 km^{2}) of oak wood in Ukraine and transporting it for sale in France.

=== La Comédie humaine and literary success ===
After writing several novels, in 1832 Balzac conceived the idea for a large series of books that would paint a panoramic portrait of "all aspects of society". The moment the idea came to him, Balzac raced to his sister's apartment and proclaimed: "I am about to become a genius!" Although he originally called it Etudes des Mœurs ('Studies of manners', or 'The Ways of the World'), it eventually became known as La Comédie humaine, and he included in it all the fiction that he had published in his lifetime under his own name.

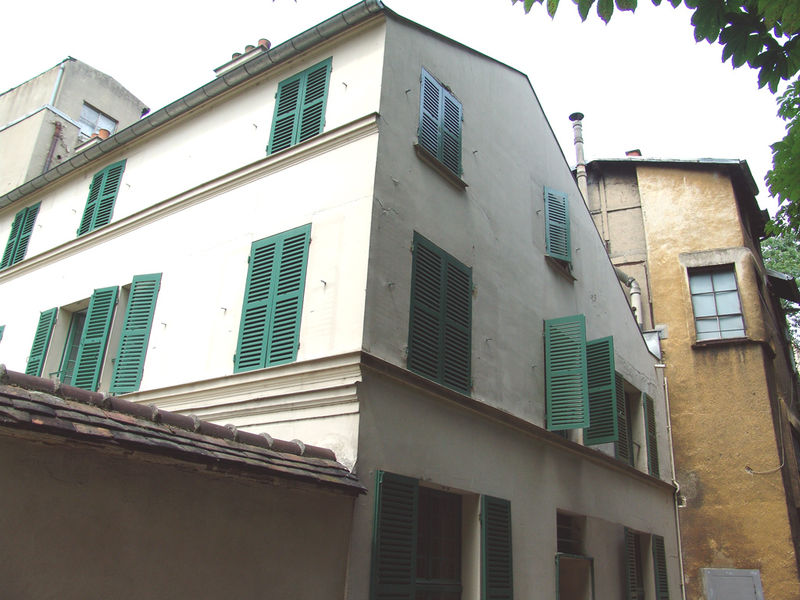
The Maison de Balzac is one of three Parisian literary museums.

After the collapse of his businesses, Balzac traveled to Brittany and stayed with the De Pommereul family outside Fougères. There he drew inspiration for Les Chouans (1829), a tale of love gone wrong amid the Chouan royalist forces. Although he was a supporter of the Crown, Balzac paints the revolutionaries in a sympathetic light—even though they are the center of the book's most brutal scenes. This was the first book Balzac released under his own name, and it gave him what one critic called "passage into the Promised Land". It established him as an author of note (even if its historical fiction-genre imitates that of Sir Walter Scott) and provided him with a name outside his past pseudonyms.

Soon afterwards, around the time of his father's death, Balzac wrote El Verdugo—about a 30-year-old man who kills his father (Balzac was 30 years old at the time). This was the first work signed "Honoré de Balzac". He followed his father in the surname Balzac but added the aristocratic-sounding nobiliary particle to help him fit into respected society, a choice based on skill rather than by right. "The aristocracy and authority of talent are more substantial than the aristocracy of names and material power", he wrote in 1830. The timing of the decision was also significant; as Robb explained: "The disappearance of the father coincides with the adoption of the nobiliary particle. A symbolic inheritance." Just as his father had worked his way up from poverty into respectable society, Balzac considered toil and effort his real mark of nobility.

When the July Revolution overthrew Charles X in 1830, Balzac declared himself a Legitimist, supporting King Charles' Royal House of Bourbon, but not without qualifications. He felt that the new July Monarchy (which claimed widespread popular support) was disorganized and unprincipled, in need of a mediator to keep the political peace between the King and insurgent forces. He called for "a young and vigorous man who belongs neither to the Directoire nor to the Empire, but who is 1830 incarnate...." He planned to be such a candidate, appealing especially to the higher classes in Chinon. But after a near-fatal accident in 1832 (he slipped and cracked his head on the street), Balzac decided not to stand for election.

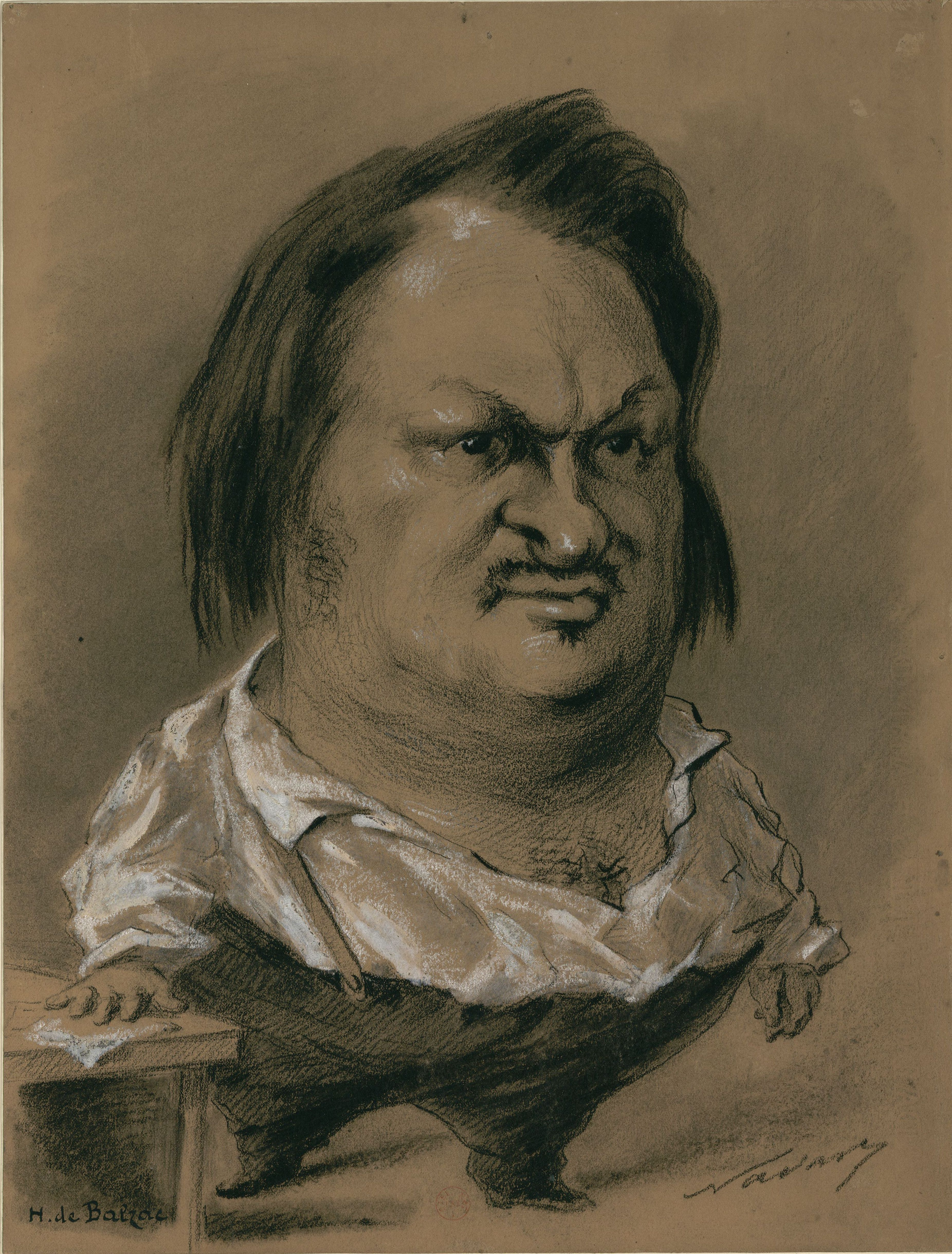
Balzac caricature by Nadar in 1850

1831 saw the success of La Peau de chagrin (The Wild Ass's Skin or The Magic Skin), a fable-like tale about a despondent young man named Raphaël de Valentin who finds an animal skin which promises great power and wealth. He obtains these things, but loses the ability to manage them. In the end, his health fails and he is consumed by his own confusion. Balzac meant the story to bear witness to the treacherous turns of life, its "serpentine motion".

In 1833 Balzac released Eugénie Grandet, his first best-seller. The tale of a young lady who inherits her father's miserliness, it also became the most critically acclaimed book of his career. The writing is simple, yet the individuals (especially the bourgeois title character) are dynamic and complex. It is followed by La Duchesse de Langeais, arguably the most sublime of his novels.

Le Père Goriot (Old Father Goriot, 1835) was his next success, in which Balzac transposes the story of King Lear to 1820s Paris in order to rage at a society bereft of all love save the love of money. The centrality of a father in this novel matches Balzac's own position—not only as mentor to his troubled young secretary, Jules Sandeau, but also the fact that he had fathered a child, Marie-Caroline Du Fresnay, with his otherwise-married lover, Maria Du Fresnay, who had been his source of inspiration for Eugénie Grandet.

In 1836, Balzac took the helm of the Chronique de Paris, a weekly magazine of society and politics. He tried to enforce strict impartiality in its pages and a reasoned assessment of various ideologies. As Rogers notes, "Balzac was interested in any social, political, or economic theory, whether from the right or the left." The magazine failed, but in July 1840 he founded another publication, the Revue Parisienne. It produced three issues.

These dismal business efforts—and his misadventures in Sardinia—provided an appropriate milieu in which to set the two-volume Illusions perdues (Lost Illusions, 1843). The novel concerns Lucien de Rubempré, a young poet trying to make a name for himself, who becomes trapped in the morass of society's darkest contradictions. Lucien's journalistic work is informed by Balzac's own failed ventures in the field. Splendeurs et misères des courtisanes (The Harlot High and Low, 1847) continues Lucien's story. He is trapped by the Abbé Herrera (Vautrin) in a convoluted and disastrous plan to regain social status. The book undergoes a massive temporal rift; the first part (of four) covers a span of six years, while the final two sections focus on just three days.

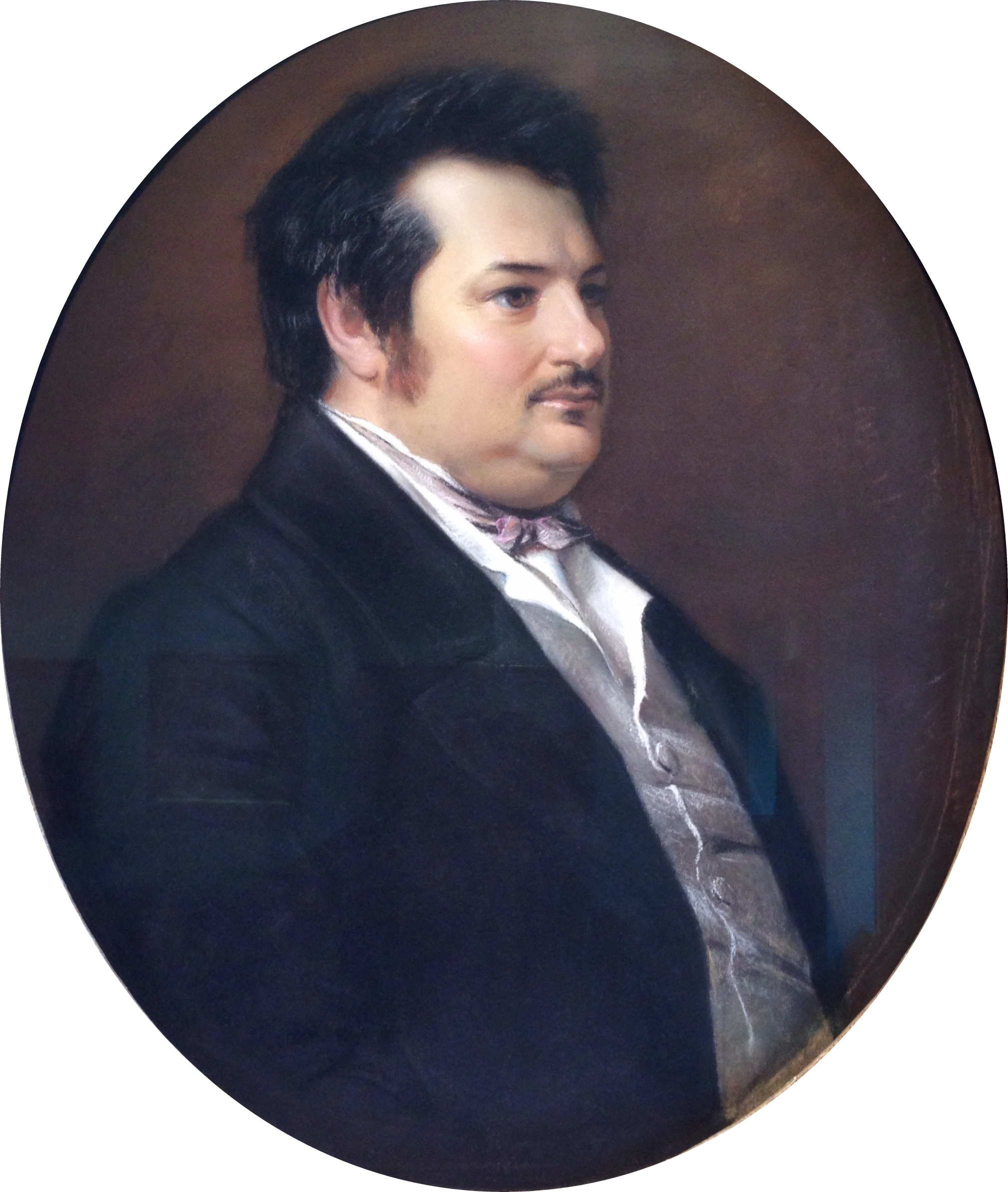
Portrait of Honoré de Balzac by Jean Alfred Gérard-Séguin (1842)

Le Cousin Pons (1847) and La Cousine Bette (1848) tell the story of Les Parents Pauvres (The Poor Relations). The conniving and wrangling over wills and inheritances reflect the expertise gained by the author as a young law clerk. Balzac's health was deteriorating by this point, making the completion of this pair of books a significant accomplishment.

Many of his novels were initially serialized, like those of Dickens. Their length was not predetermined. Illusions Perdues extends to a thousand pages after starting inauspiciously in a small-town print shop, whereas La Fille aux yeux d'or (The Girl with the Golden Eyes, 1835) opens with a broad panorama of Paris but becomes a closely plotted novella of only fifty pages. According to the literary critic Kornelije Kvas, "Balzac's use of the same characters (Rastignac, Vautrin) in different parts of The Human Comedy is a consequence of the realist striving for narrative economy".

=== Work habits ===
Balzac's work habits were legendary. He wrote from 1 A.M. to 8 A.M. every morning and sometimes even longer. Balzac could write very rapidly; some of his novels, written with a quill, were composed at a pace equal to thirty words per minute on a modern typewriter. His preferred method was to eat a light meal at five or six in the afternoon, then sleep until midnight. He then rose and wrote for many hours, fueled by innumerable cups of black coffee. He often worked for fifteen hours or more at a stretch; he claimed to have once worked for 48 hours with only three hours of rest in the middle.

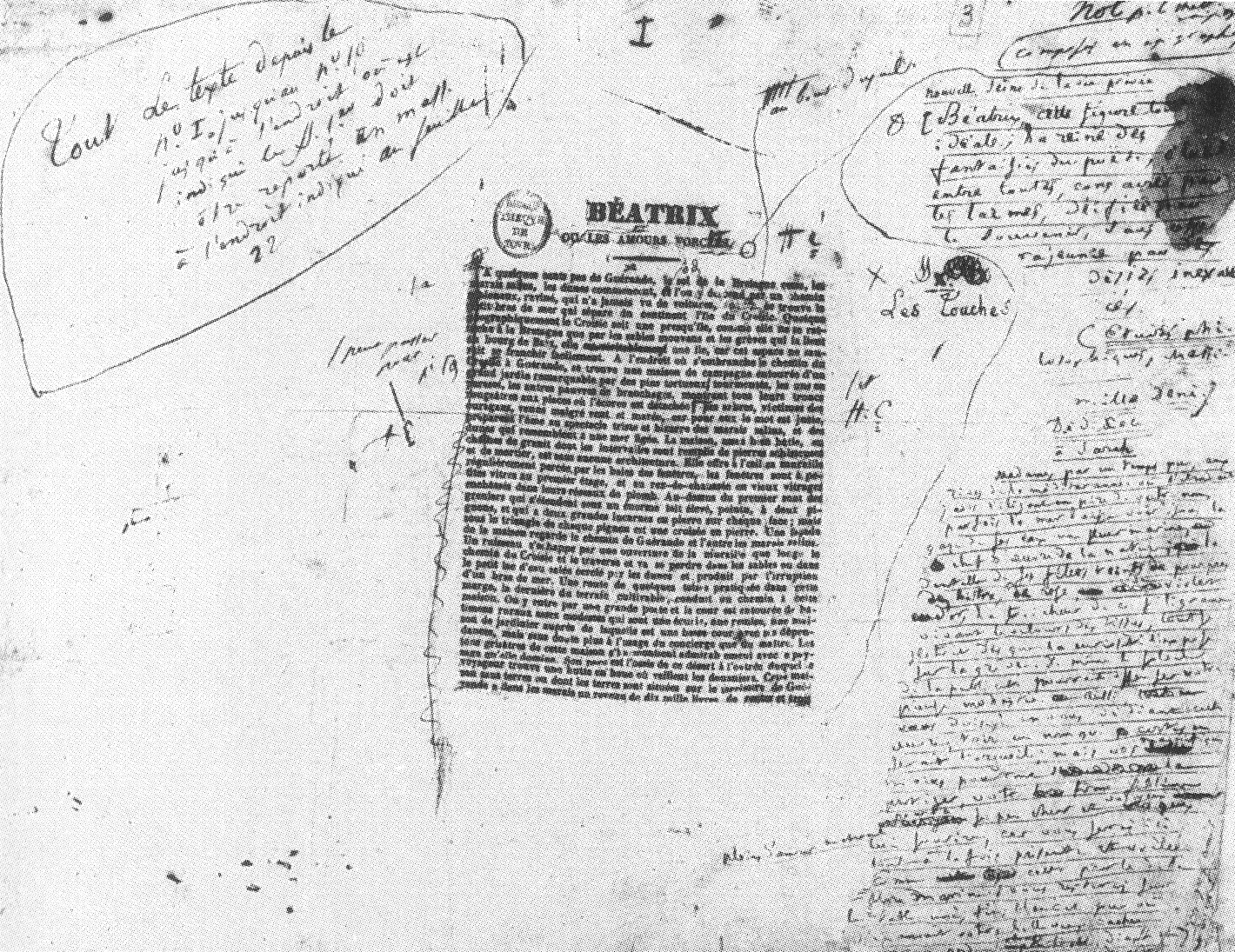
Initial proofs of Béatrix

Balzac revised obsessively, covering printer's proofs with changes and additions to be reset. He sometimes repeated this process during the publication of a book, causing significant expense both for himself and the publisher. As a result, the finished product quite often was different from the original text. Although some of his books never reached completion, some—such as Les employés (The Government Clerks, 1841)—are nonetheless noted by critics.

Although Balzac was "by turns a hermit and a vagrant", he managed to stay in tune with the social spheres which nourished his writing. He was friends with Théophile Gautier, Hector Berlioz, Franz Liszt, George Sand, Frederic Chopin, Gioachino Rossini and Pierre-Marie-Charles de Bernard du Grail de la Villette, and he was acquainted with Victor Hugo. Nevertheless, he did not spend as much time in salons and clubs of Paris like many of his characters. "In the first place he was too busy", explains Saintsbury, "in the second he would not have been at home there.... [H]e felt it was his business not to frequent society but to create it". However, he often spent long periods at the Château de Saché, near Tours, the home of his friend Jean de Margonne, his mother's lover and father to her youngest child. Many of Balzac's tormented characters were conceived in the chateau's small second-floor bedroom. Today the chateau is a museum dedicated to the author's life.

=== Marriage, romantic relationships, and death ===
In 1833, as he revealed in a letter to his sister, Balzac entered into an illicit affair with fellow writer Maria Du Fresnay, who was then aged 24. Her marriage to a considerably older man (Charles du Fresnay, Mayor of Sartrouville) had been a failure from the outset. In this letter, Balzac also reveals that the young woman had just come to tell him that she was pregnant with his child. In 1834, eight months after the event, Maria Du Fresnay's daughter by Balzac, Marie-Caroline Du Fresnay, was born. This revelation from French journalist Roger Pierrot in 1955 confirmed what was already suspected by several historians: the dedicatee of the novel Eugénie Grandet, a certain "Maria", turns out to be Maria Du Fresnay herself. Balzac had also long been suspected of being attracted to males as well. When the official records of homosexuals once maintained by the Paris police were finally released, his name was found listed.

In February 1832, Balzac received an intriguing letter from Odessa—with no return address and signed simply "L'Étrangère" ("The Foreigner")—expressing sadness at the cynicism and atheism in La Peau de Chagrin and its negative portrayal of women. His response was to place a classified advertisement in the Gazette de France, hoping that his anonymous critic would see it. Thus began a fifteen-year correspondence between Balzac and "the object of [his] sweetest dreams": Ewelina Hańska.

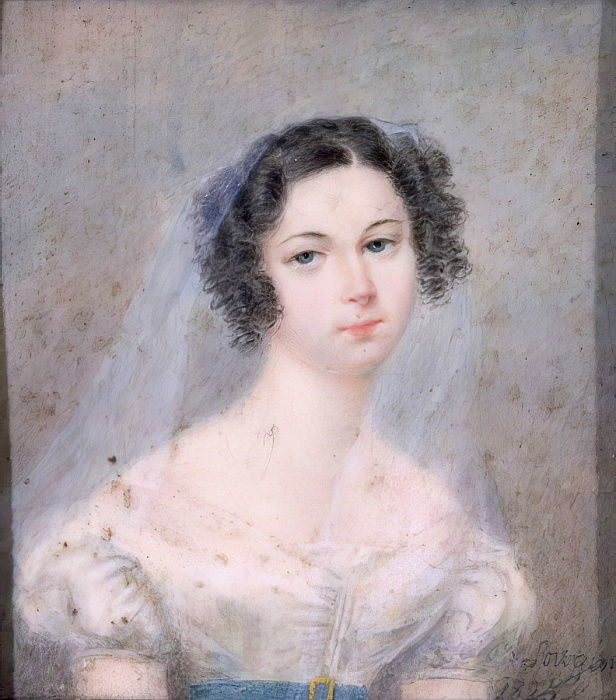
Countess Ewelina Hańska miniature by Holz von Sowgen (1825)

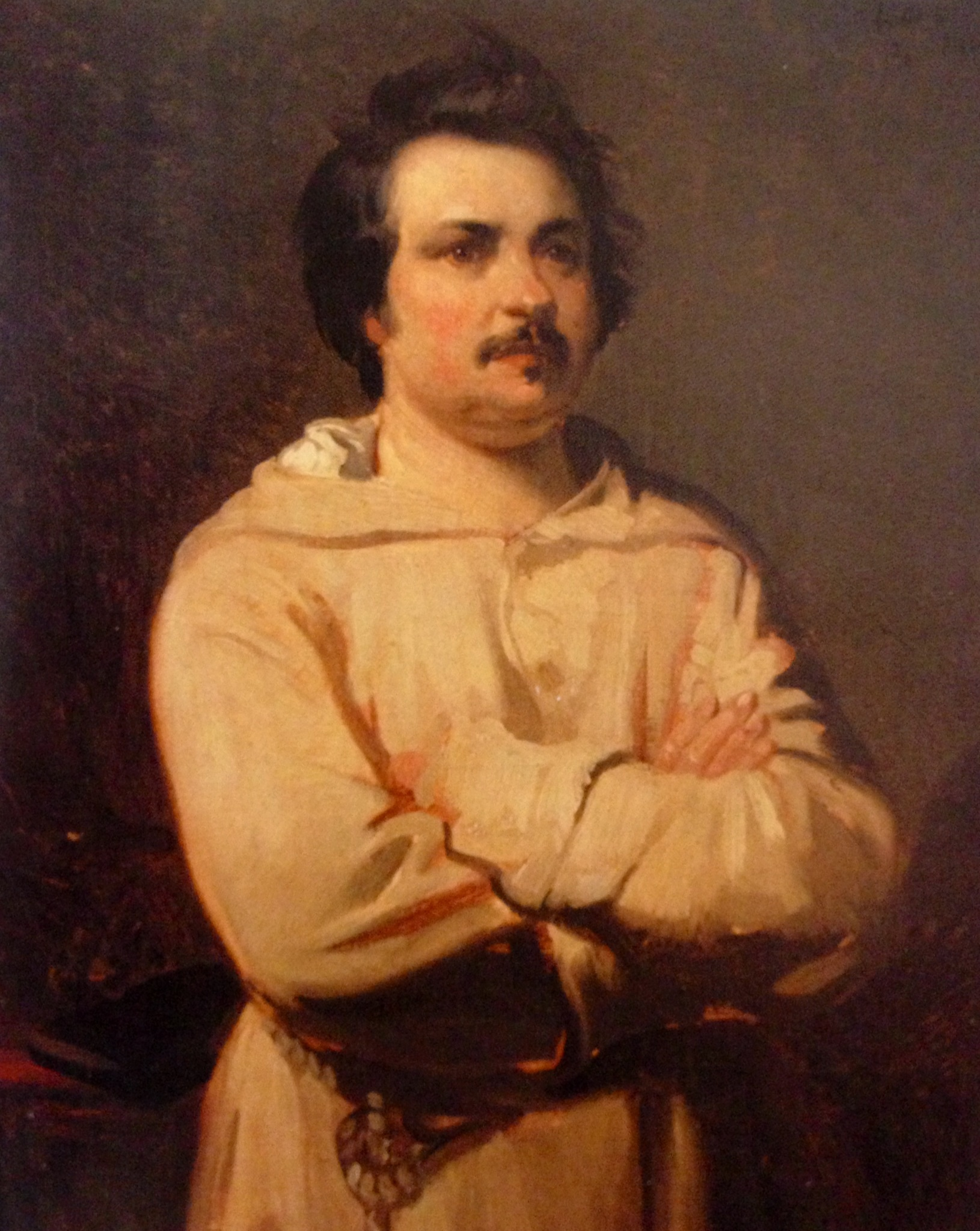
Portrait of Balzac in his famous dressing gown, by Louis Boulanger.

Ewelina (née Rzewuska) was married to a nobleman twenty years her senior, Marshal Wacław Hański, a wealthy Polish landowner living near Kyiv. It had been a marriage of convenience to preserve her family's fortune. In Balzac, Countess Ewelina found a kindred spirit for her emotional and social desires, with the added benefit of feeling a connection to the glamorous capital of France. Their correspondence reveals an intriguing balance of passion, propriety and patience; Robb says it is "like an experimental novel in which the female protagonist is always trying to pull in extraneous realities but which the hero is determined to keep on course, whatever tricks he has to use".

Marshal Hański died in 1841, and his widow and her admirer finally had the chance to pursue their affections. A rival of the Hungarian composer Franz Liszt, Balzac visited Countess Hańska in Saint Petersburg in 1843 and won her heart. After a series of financial setbacks, health problems and objections from Tsar Nicholas I, the couple finally received permission to wed. On 14 March 1850, with Balzac's health in serious decline, they travelled by carriage from her family seat at Verhivnya Park in Volhynia to St. Barbara's Catholic Church in Berdychiv (Russia's former banking city in present-day Ukraine), where they were married by Abbot Ożarowski. The ten-hour journey to and from the ceremony took a toll on both husband and wife: her feet were too swollen to walk, and he endured severe heart trouble.

Although he married late in life, Balzac had already written two treatises on marriage: Physiologie du Mariage and Scènes de la Vie Conjugale. These works lacked firsthand knowledge; Saintsbury points out that "cœlebs cannot talk of [marriage] with much authority". In late April the newly-weds set off for Paris. His health deteriorated on the way, and Ewelina wrote to her daughter about Balzac being "in a state of extreme weakness" and "sweating profusely". They arrived in the French capital on 20 May, his fifty-first birthday.

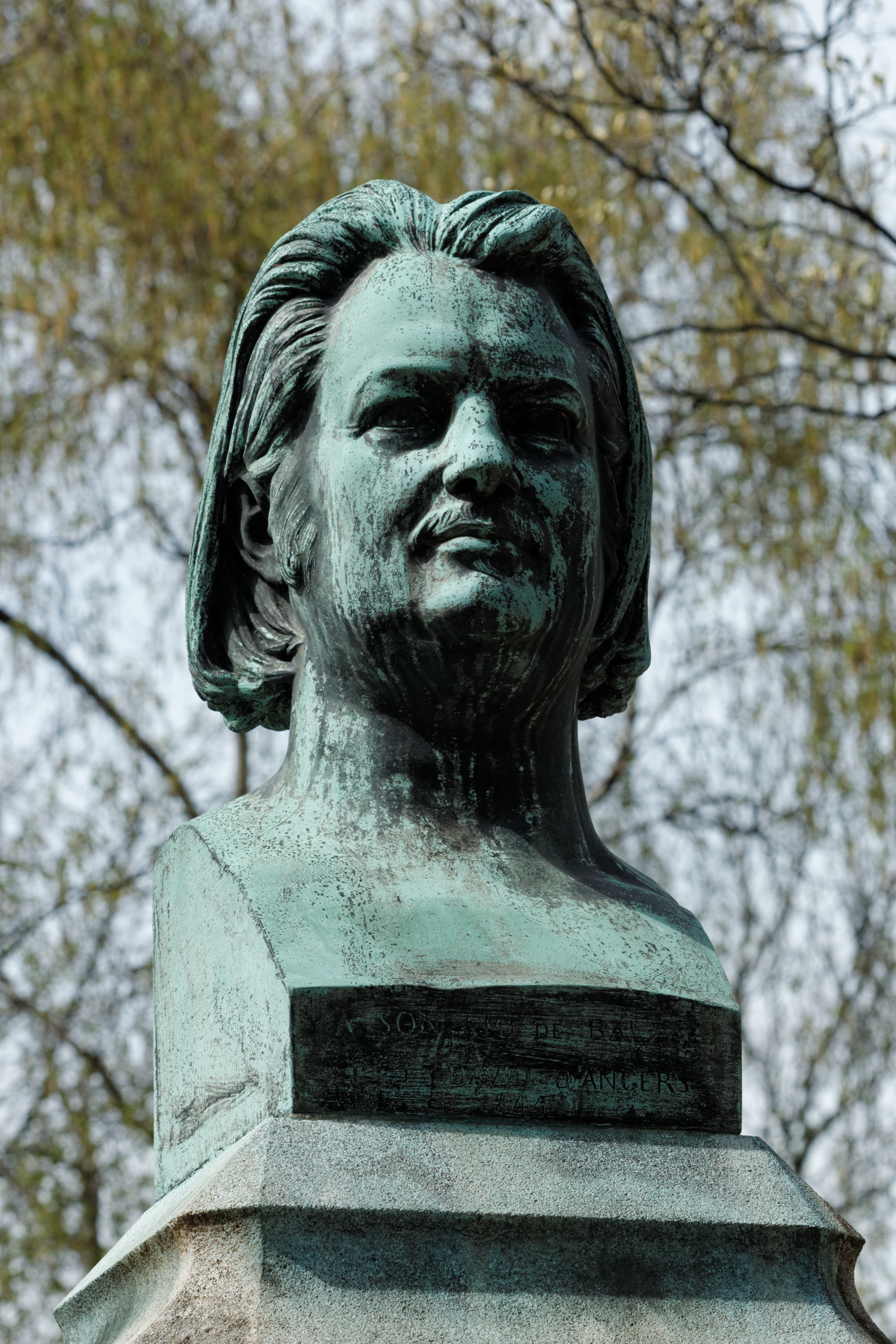
Bust of Balzac by David d'Angers at his tomb in the Cimetière du Père-Lachaise

Five months after his wedding, on Sunday, 18 August 1850, Balzac died of gangrene associated with congestive heart failure, in the presence of his mother—his wife, Eve de Balzac (formerly Countess Hańska) had gone to bed. He had been visited that day by Victor Hugo, who later served as a pallbearer and the eulogist at Balzac's funeral. Some modern researchers have attributed a factor in his death to excessive coffee consumption or a caffeine overdose (Balzac reportedly drank more than 50 cups a day) but this has yet to be proved.

Balzac is buried at Père Lachaise Cemetery in Paris. At his memorial service, Victor Hugo pronounced: "Today we have people in black because of the death of the man of talent; a nation in mourning for a man of genius". The funeral was attended by "almost every writer in Paris", including Frédérick Lemaître, Gustave Courbet, Dumas père and Dumas fils, as well as representatives of the Légion d'honneur and other dignitaries.

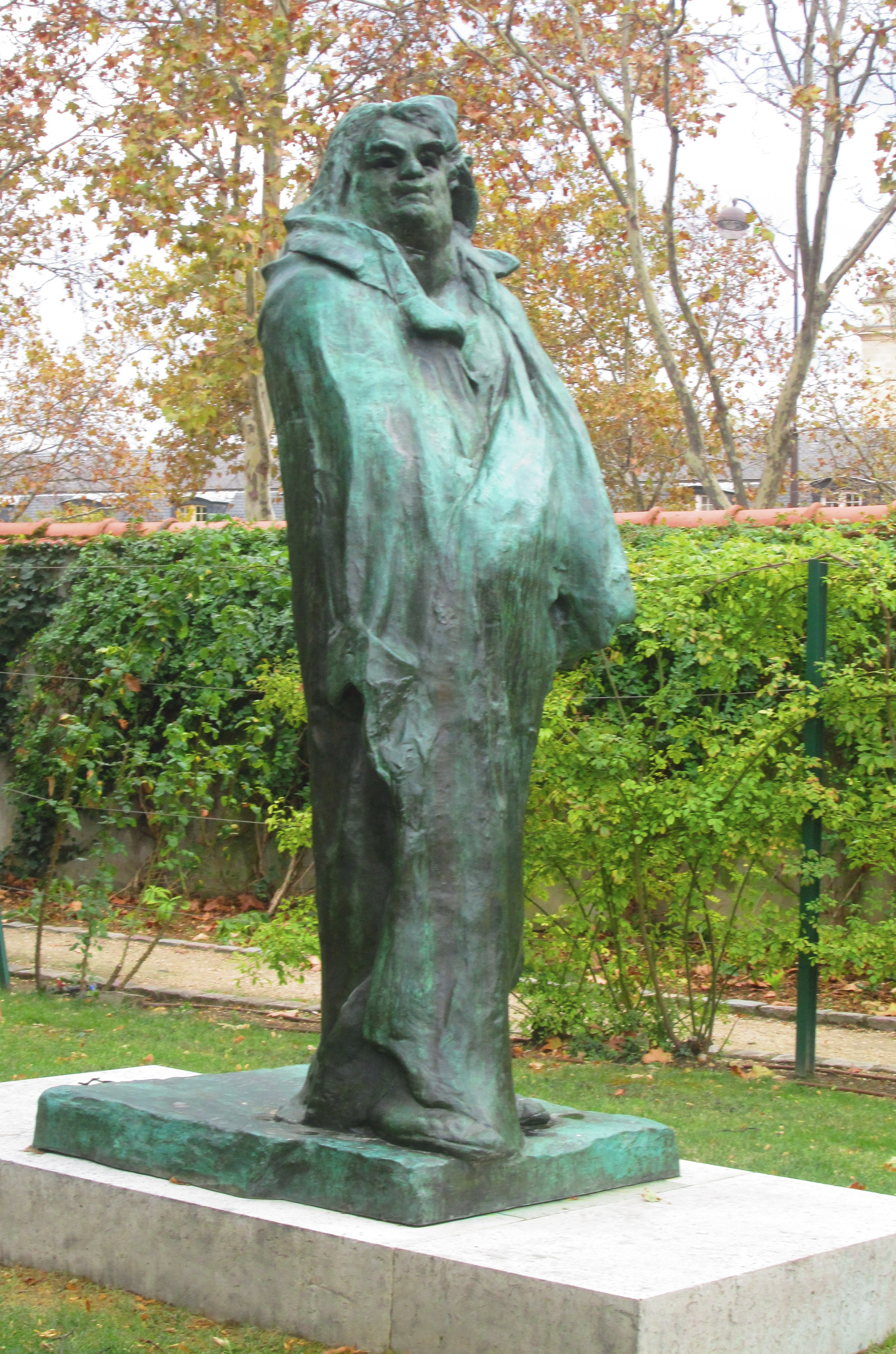
Monument to Balzac by Auguste Rodin

In the 1890s, the celebrated French sculptor Auguste Rodin created a statue called the Monument to Balzac. Cast in bronze, the Balzac Monument has stood since 1939 nearby the intersection of Boulevard Raspail and Boulevard Montparnasse at Place Pablo-Picasso. Rodin featured Balzac in several of his smaller sculptures as well.

== Writing style ==
The Comédie humaine remained unfinished at the time of his death—Balzac had plans to include numerous other books, most of which he never started. He frequently flitted between works in progress. "Finished articles" were frequently revised between editions. This piecemeal style is reflective of the author's own life, a possible attempt to stabilize it through fiction. "The vanishing man", wrote Sir Victor Pritchett, "who must be pursued from the rue Cassini to ... Versailles, Ville d'Avray, Italy, and Vienna can construct a settled dwelling only in his work".

=== Realism ===
Balzac's extensive use of detail, especially the detail of objects, to illustrate the lives of his characters made him an early pioneer of literary realism. Whilst he admired and drew inspiration from the Romantic style of Scottish novelist Walter Scott, Balzac sought to depict human existence through the use of particulars. In the preface to the first edition of Scènes de la Vie privée, he wrote: "the author firmly believes that details alone will henceforth determine the merit of works". Plentiful descriptions of décor, clothing, and possessions help breathe life into the characters. For example, Balzac's friend Henri de Latouche had a good knowledge of hanging wallpaper. Balzac transferred this to his descriptions of the Pension Vauquer in Le Père Goriot, making the wallpaper speak of the identities of those living inside.

Some critics consider Balzac's writing exemplary of naturalism—a more pessimistic and analytical form of realism, which seeks to explain human behavior as intrinsically linked with the environment. French novelist Émile Zola declared Balzac the father of the naturalist novel. Zola indicated that whilst the Romantics saw the world through a colored lens, the naturalist sees through a clear glass—precisely the sort of effect Balzac attempted to achieve in his works.

==== Characters ====
Balzac sought to present his characters as real people, neither fully good nor fully evil, but completely human. "To arrive at the truth", he wrote in the preface to Le Lys dans la vallée, "writers use whatever literary device seems capable of giving the greatest intensity of life to their characters". "Balzac's characters", Robb notes, "were as real to him as if he were observing them in the outside world". This reality was noted by playwright Oscar Wilde, who said: "One of the greatest tragedies of my life is the death of [Splendeurs et misères des courtisanes protagonist] Lucien de Rubempré.... It haunts me in my moments of pleasure. I remember it when I laugh."

At the same time, the characters depict a particular range of social types: the noble soldier, the scoundrel, the proud workman, the fearless spy, the alluring mistress. That Balzac was able to balance the strength of the individual against the representation of the type is evidence of the author's skill. One critic explained that "there is a center and a circumference to Balzac's world".

Balzac's use of repeat characters, moving in and out of the Comédie's books, strengthens the realist representation. "When the characters reappear", notes Rogers, "they do not step out of nowhere; they emerge from the privacy of their own lives which, for an interval, we have not been allowed to see". He also used a realist technique which French novelist Marcel Proust later termed "retrospective illumination", whereby a character's past is revealed long after she or he first appears.

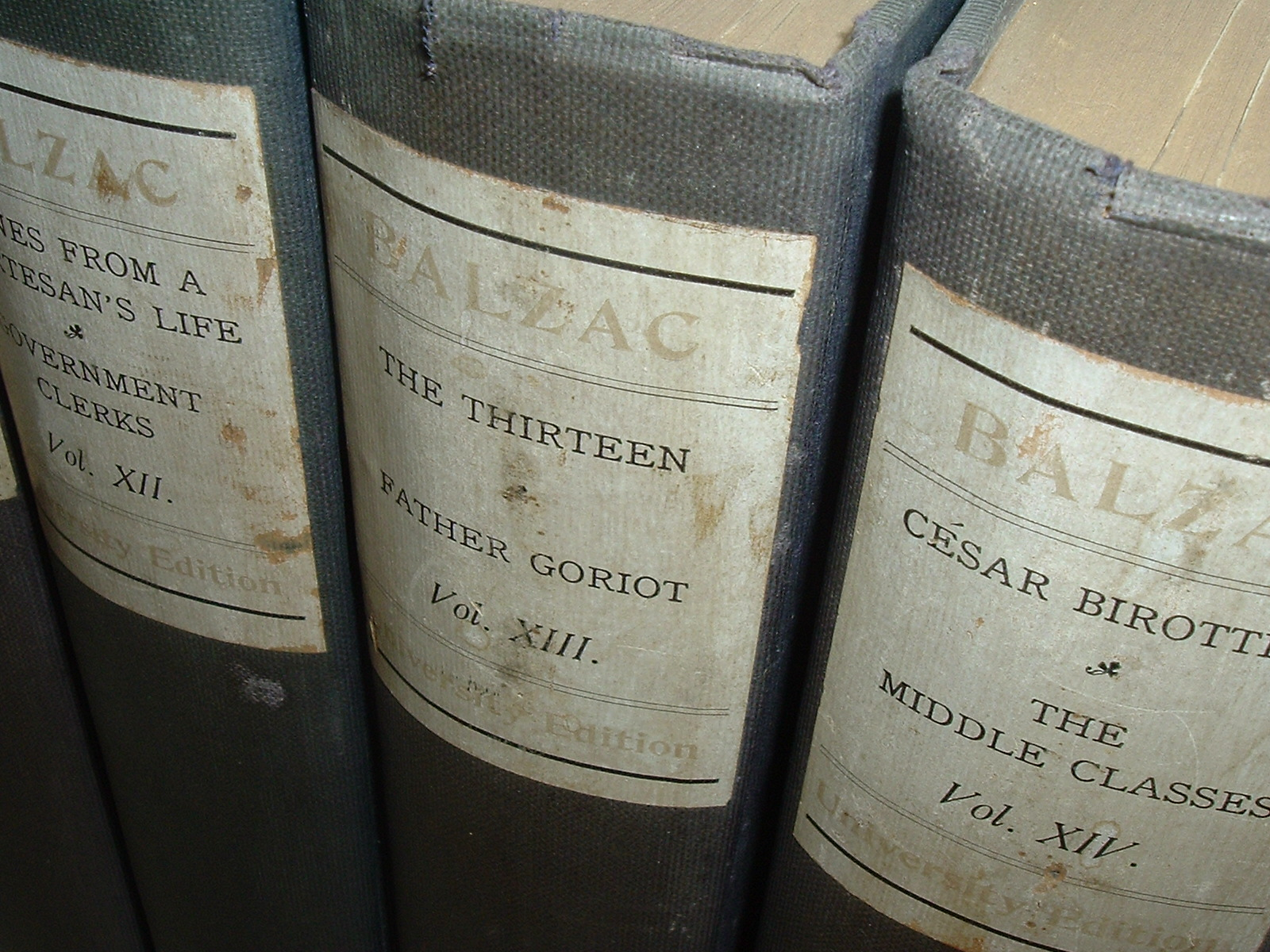
The Works of Honoré de Balzac (1901), including Le Père Goriot

A nearly infinite reserve of energy propels the characters in Balzac's novels. Struggling against the currents of human nature and society, they may lose more often than they win—but only rarely do they give up. This universal trait is a reflection of Balzac's own social wrangling, that of his family, and an interest in the Austrian mystic and physician Franz Mesmer, who pioneered the study of animal magnetism. Balzac spoke often of a "nervous and fluid force" between individuals, and Raphaël de Valentin's decline in La Peau de Chagrin exemplifies the danger of withdrawing from other people's company.

==== Place ====
Representations of the city, countryside, and building interiors are essential to Balzac's realism, often serving to paint a naturalistic backdrop before which the characters' lives follow a particular course; this gave him a reputation as an early naturalist. Intricate details about locations sometimes stretch for fifteen or twenty pages. As he did with the people around him, Balzac studied these places in depth, traveling to remote locations and comparing notes that he had made on previous visits.

The influence of Paris permeates La Comédie: nature defers to the artificial metropolis, in contrast to descriptions of the weather and wildlife in the countryside. "If in Paris", Rogers says, "we are in a man-made region where even the seasons are forgotten, these provincial towns are nearly always pictured in their natural setting". Balzac said, "the streets of Paris possess human qualities and we cannot shake off the impressions they make upon our minds." His labyrinthine city provided a literary model used later by English novelist Charles Dickens and Russian author Fyodor Dostoevsky. The centrality of Paris in La Comédie humaine is key to Balzac's legacy as a realist. "Realism is nothing if not urban", notes critic Peter Brooks; the scene of a young man coming into the city to find his fortune is ubiquitous in the realist novel, and appears repeatedly in Balzac's works, such as Illusions Perdues.

Balzac visited the Château de Saché in Touraine which was owned by his friend Jean de Margonne (who was also his mother's lover), between 1830 and 1837, and wrote many of his novels in the series La Comédie humaine there. It is now a museum dedicated to Balzac where one can see his writing desk and quill pen and chair.

=== Perspective ===
Balzac's literary mood evolved over time from one of despondency and chagrin to that of solidarity and courage—but not optimism. La Peau de Chagrin, among his earliest novels, is a pessimistic tale of confusion and destruction. But the cynicism declined as his oeuvre developed, and the characters of Illusions Perdues reveal sympathy for those who are pushed to one side by society. As part of the 19th-century evolution of the novel as a "democratic literary form", Balzac wrote that "les livres sont faits pour tout le monde" ("books are written for everybody").

Balzac concerned himself overwhelmingly with the darker essence of human nature and the corrupting influence of middle and high societies. His mission was to observe humankind in its most representative state, frequently wandering through the streets incognito among the masses of Parisian society to undertake his research. He used incidents from his life and the people around him, in works like Eugénie Grandet and Louis Lambert.

=== Politics ===
Balzac was a legitimist; in many ways, his views are the antithesis of Victor Hugo's democratic republicanism. He wrote, in his essay Society and the Individual:

The only absolute authority which the imagination has been able to conceive, the authority of God, works according to rules which He has imposed on Himself. He can destroy all His worlds and return to His rest, but while He allows them to exist, they continue to be governed by the laws which together create order.

Balzac was influenced by the counter-revolutionary philosopher and statesman Louis de Bonald, and once remarked that "[w]hen it beheaded Louis XVI, the Revolution beheaded in his person all fathers of families." Nevertheless, his keen insight regarding working-class conditions earned him the esteem of many socialists, including Marxists. Engels declared that Balzac was his favorite writer. Marx's Das Kapital also makes some references to the works of Balzac, and Trotsky famously read Balzac in the middle of meetings of the Central Committee, much to the consternation of his colleagues and comrades.

== Legacy ==
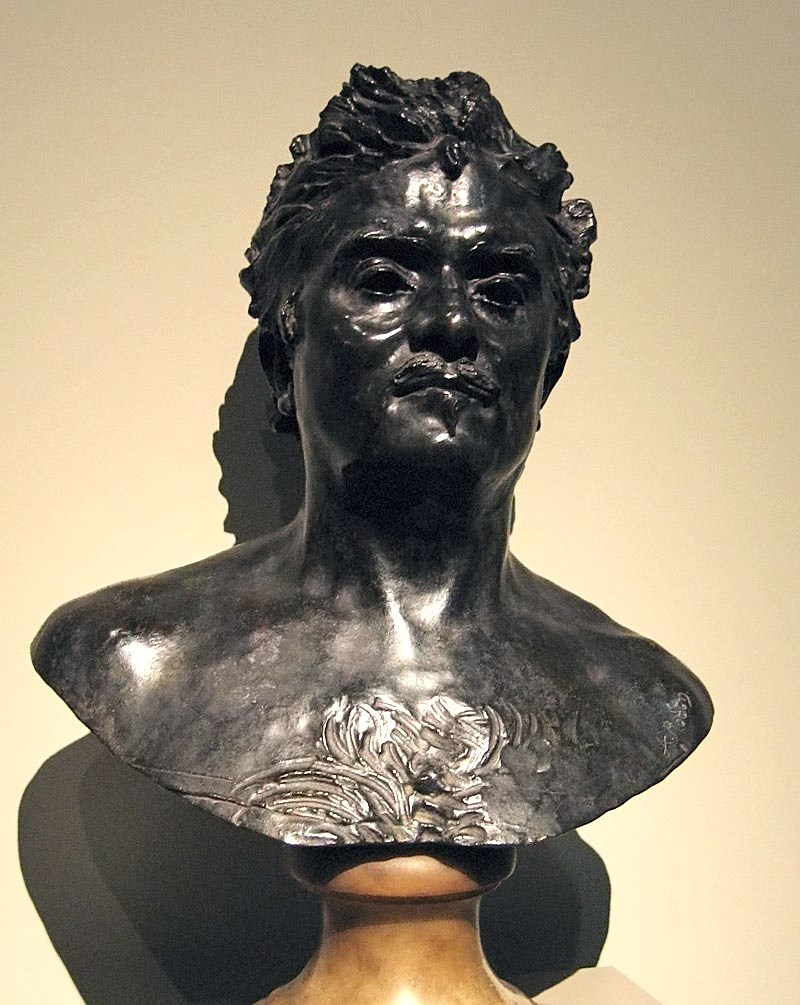
Bust of Balzac by Auguste Rodin (1892), displayed at the Victoria and Albert Museum in London

Balzac influenced writers of his time and beyond. He has been compared to Charles Dickens and is considered one of Dickens' significant influences. Literary critic W. H. Helm calls one "the French Dickens" and the other "the English Balzac", while another critic, Richard Lehan, states that "Balzac was the bridge between the comic realism of Dickens and the naturalism of Zola".

Gustave Flaubert was also substantially influenced by Balzac. Praising his portrayal of society while attacking his prose style, Flaubert once wrote: "What a man he would have been had he known how to write!" While he disdained the label of "realist", Flaubert clearly took heed of Balzac's close attention to detail and unvarnished depictions of bourgeois life. This influence shows in Flaubert's work L'éducation sentimentale which owes a debt to Balzac's Illusions Perdues. "What Balzac started", observes Lehan, "Flaubert helped finish".

Marcel Proust similarly learned from the Realist example; he adored Balzac and studied his works carefully, although he criticised what he perceived as Balzac's "vulgarity". Balzac's story Une Heure de ma Vie (An Hour of my Life, 1822), in which minute details are followed by deep personal reflections, is a clear forebear of the style which Proust used in À la recherche du temps perdu. However, Proust wrote later in life that the contemporary fashion of ranking Balzac higher than Tolstoy was "madness".

Perhaps the author most affected by Balzac was American expatriate novelist Henry James. In 1878 James wrote with sadness about the lack of contemporary attention paid to Balzac, and lavished praise on him in four essays (in 1875, 1877, 1902, and 1913). In 1878 James wrote: "Large as Balzac is, he is all of one piece and he hangs perfectly together". He wrote with admiration of Balzac's attempt to portray in writing "a beast with a hundred claws". In his own novels James explored more of the psychological motives of the characters and less of the historical sweep exhibited by Balzac—a conscious style preference; he stated: "the artist of the Comédie humaine is half smothered by the historian". Still, both authors used the form of the realist novel to probe the machinations of society and the myriad motives of human behavior.

William Saroyan wrote a short story about Balzac in his 1971 book, Letters from 74 rue Taitbout or Don't Go But If You Must Say Hello To Everybody.

Balzac's vision of a society in which class, money and personal ambition are the key players has been endorsed by critics of both left-wing and right-wing political persuasions. Marxist Friedrich Engels wrote: "I have learned more [from Balzac] than from all the professional historians, economists and statisticians put together". Balzac has received high praise from critics as diverse as Walter Benjamin and Camille Paglia. He was also praised by James Baldwin, who said in 1984: "I'm sure that my life in France would have been very different had I not met Balzac. [He taught me] the way that country and its society works." In 1970 Roland Barthes published S/Z, a detailed analysis of Balzac's story Sarrasine and a key work in structuralist literary criticism. Carlos Fuentes, sometimes called "the Balzac of Mexico", cited Balzac as a major influence on his writing.

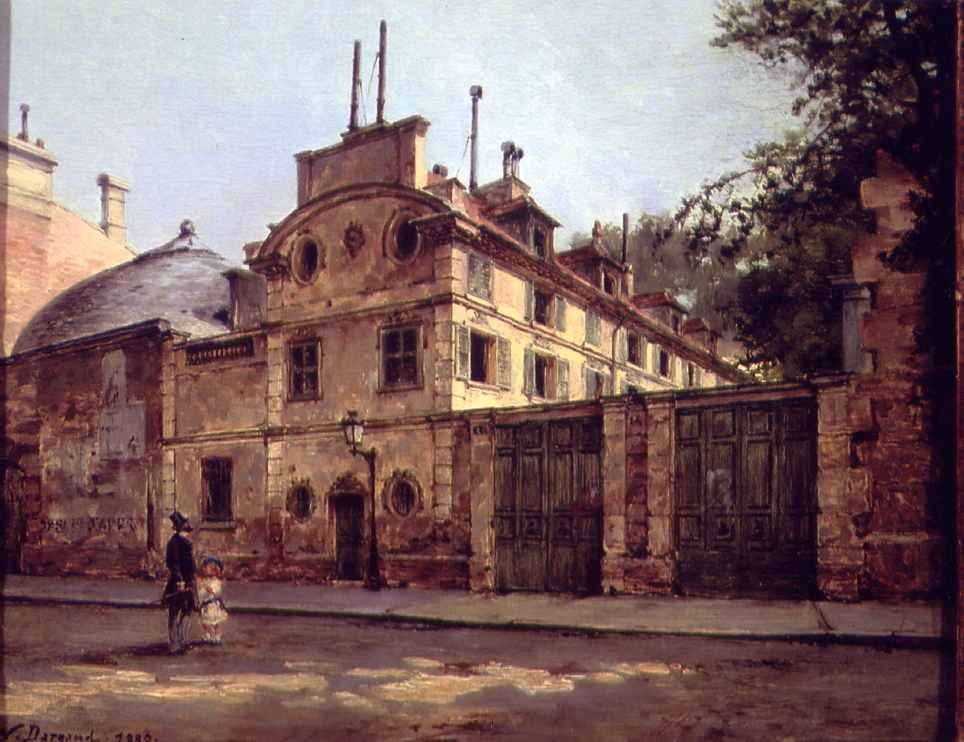
Mme de Balzac's dower house in Paris VIII

Balzac has also influenced popular culture. Many of his works have been made into popular films and television serials, including: Travers Vale's Père Goriot (1915), Les Chouans (1947), Le Père Goriot (1968 BBC mini-series), and La Cousine Bette (1974 BBC mini-series, starring Margaret Tyzack and Helen Mirren; 1998 film, starring Jessica Lange). Balzac is mentioned, along with Chaucer and Rabelais, to humorous effect (as authors of allegedly unreliable morals) in Meredith Willson's musical The Music Man. The young protagonist in François Truffaut's 1959 film The 400 Blows is so enamored of Balzac that he unwittingly plagiarizes the writer and starts a small apartment fire with a candle he lights in Balzac's honor. Truffaut believed Balzac and Proust to be the greatest French writers.

His life was dramatised as the 1950 Australian radio play Balzac.

== Works ==
=== Novels ===
- Les Chouans (1829)
- La Maison du chat-qui-pelote (1829)
- La Vendetta (1830)
- La Peau de chagrin (1831)
- Les Proscrits (1831)
- Louis Lambert (1832)
- Eugénie Grandet (1834)
- Le Médecin de campagne (1833)
- Ferragus, chef des Dévorants (1833)
- La Duchesse de Langeais (1834)
- La Recherche de l'absolu (1834)
- Séraphîta (1834)
- Le Père Goriot (1835)
- Le Lys dans la vallée (1835)
- Le Contrat de mariage (1835)
- La Vieille Fille (1836)
- César Birotteau (1837)
- La Muse du département (1832–1837)
- Le Cabinet des Antiques (1838)
- Une fille d'Ève (1838)
- Béatrix (1839)
- Le Curé de village (1839)
- Un grand homme de province à Paris (1839)
- Ursule Mirouët (1841)
- Une ténébreuse affaire (1841)
- Mémoires de deux jeunes mariées (1841)
- La Fausse Maîtresse (1841)
- La Femme de trente ans (1829–1842)
- Albert Savarus (1842)
- La Rabouilleuse (1842)
- Un début dans la vie (1842)
- Illusions perdues (1837–1843)
- Honorine (1843)
- Modeste Mignon (1844)
- La Cousine Bette (1847)
- Splendeurs et misères des courtisanes (1838–1847)
- Le Cousin Pons (1847)
- La Comédie humaine (1848)
- L'Envers de l'histoire contemporaine (1848)
- Les Paysans (1855)
- La Petite Bourgeoise (1850)

=== Published pseudonymously ===
==== As "Lord Rhône", in collaboration ====
- L'Héritière de Birague (1822)
- Jean-Louis (1822)

==== As "Horace de Saint-Aubin" ====
- Clotilde de Lusignan (1822)
- Le Centenaire (1822)
- Le Vicaire des Ardennes (1822)
- La Dernière Fée (1823)
- Annette et le Criminal (Argow le Pirate) (1824)
- Wann-Chlore (1826)

=== Published anonymously ===
- Du Droit d'aînesse (1824)
- Histoire impartiale des Jésuites (1824)
- Code des gens honnêtes (1826)

=== Ghost written ===
- Maximes et Pensées de Napoléon recueillies par J. L. Gaudy (Jeune) (1838)

=== Incomplete at time of death ===
- Le Corsaire (opera)
- Sténie
- Falthurne
- Corsino
- Le Député d'Arcis

=== Novellas ===
- Le Bal de Sceaux (1830)
- Sarrasine (1830)
- Une double famille (1830)
- La Paix du ménage (1830)
- Gobseck (1830)
- El Verdugo (1830)
- Le Colonel Chabert (1832)
- Le Curé de Tours (1832)
- La Fille aux yeux d'or (1835)
- Les Secrets de la princesse de Cadignan (1839)
- Z. Marcas (1840)
- L'Amour masqué (1911)

=== Short story collection ===
- Les Cent Contes drolatiques (1832–1837)

=== Short stories ===
- "Étude de femme" (1830)
- "Adieu" (1830)
- "Le Chef-d'œuvre inconnu" (1831)
- "La Grande Bretèche" (1831)
- "Le Réquisitionnaire" (1831)
- "L'Auberge rouge" (1831)
- "La Comédie du diable" (1831)
- "La Bourse" (1832)
- "La Grenadière" (1832)
- "Le Message" (1832)
- "Un drame au bord de la mer" (1834)
- "La Messe de l'athée" (1836)
- "Facino Cane" (1837)
- "Le Succube" (1837)
- "Gambara" (1837)
- "Massimilla Doni" (1837)
- "Pierre Grassou" (1839)
- "Un épisode sous la Terreur" (1842)

=== Plays ===
- L'École des ménages (1839)
- Vautrin (1839)
- Pierre Grassou (1839)
- Les Ressources de Quinola (1842)
- Paméla Giraud (1842)
- La Marâtre (1848)
- Mercadet ou le faiseur (1848)

=== Tragic verse ===
- Cromwell (1819)

== See also ==
- L'Année balzacienne (in French)
- Balzac Society of America
- Balzac and the Little Chinese Seamstress (film)
- List of works by Alexandre Falguière (statue of Balzac)
- Rzewuski family (Mme. Eve de Balzac)
- Henry James
- Popular novel in France

== Sources ==
- Adamson, Donald (1986). "Le Père Goriot devant la critique anglaise". L'Année balzacienne (in French). 7. ISSN 1969-6752. In L'Année balzacienne. II. 20. Garnier Frères. 1999. ISBN 978-2-13-050961-5
- Adamson, Donald (2001). Balzac and the Tradition of the European Novel
- Bertault, Philippe (1963). Balzac and The Human Comedy. English version by Richard Monges. New York: NYU Press. OCLC 344556
- Brooks, Peter (2005). Realist Vision. New Haven: Yale University Press. ISBN 0-300-10680-7
- Chandler, David G. (2023). "General Introduction". In Chandler, David G.; Heuser, Beatrice (eds.). Napoleon's Military Maxims. Greenhill Books. pp. 13–34. ISBN 9781805000112.
- Helm, W.H. (1905). Aspects of Balzac. London: Eveleigh Nash. OCLC 2321317
- James, Henry (1878). French Poets and Novelists. London: Macmillan & Co., pp. 84–189.
- James, Henry (1914). Notes on Novelists. New York: Charles Scribner's Sons, pp. 109–159. OCLC 679102
- Lehan, Richard (2005). Realism and Naturalism. Madison: The University of Wisconsin Press. ISBN 0-299-20870-2
- Leone, Giuseppe (1999). "Honoré de Balzac, una creatività "sempre recidiva, mai stanca" – Con lui il romanzo s'è fatto uomo", su "Ricorditi di me...", in "Lecco 2000", Lecco, febbraio 1999
- Maurois, André (1965). Prométhée ou la vie de Balzac. Paris: Hachette.
- Lotte, Fernand (1952). Dictionnaire biographique des personnages fictifs de la comédie humaine. (in French). Paris: Corti. ISBN 0-320-05184-6
- Prendergast, Christopher (1978). Balzac: Fiction and Melodrama. London: Edward Arnold Ltd. ISBN 0-7131-5969-3
- Pritchett, V. S. (1973). Balzac. New York: Alfred A. Knopf Inc. ISBN 0-394-48357-X
- Proust, Marcel (1994). Against Sainte-Beuve and Other Essays. Harmondsworth: Penguin Books. ISBN 0-14-018525-9
- Robb, Graham (1994). Balzac: A Biography. New York: W. W. Norton & Company. ISBN 0-393-03679-0.
- Rogers, Samuel (1953). Balzac & The Novel. New York: Octagon Books. LCCN 75-76005
- Saintsbury, George (1901). "Honoré de Balzac". In: The Works of Honoré de Balzac, Vol. I. Philadelphia: Avil Publishing Company, pp. vii–xivi. OCLC 6314807
- Saintsbury, George (1911). "Balzac, Honoré de" . In Chisholm, Hugh (ed.). Encyclopædia Britannica. Vol. 3 (11th ed.). Cambridge University Press. pp. 298–301.
- Stowe, William W. (1983). "Systematic Realism". In: Honoré de Balzac. Edited by Harold Bloom. Philadelphia: Chelsea House Publishers. ISBN 0-7910-7042-5
- Zweig, Stefan (1946). Balzac. New York: Viking Press. OCLC 342322
