= Le Curé de village =

1841 novel by Honoré de Balzac

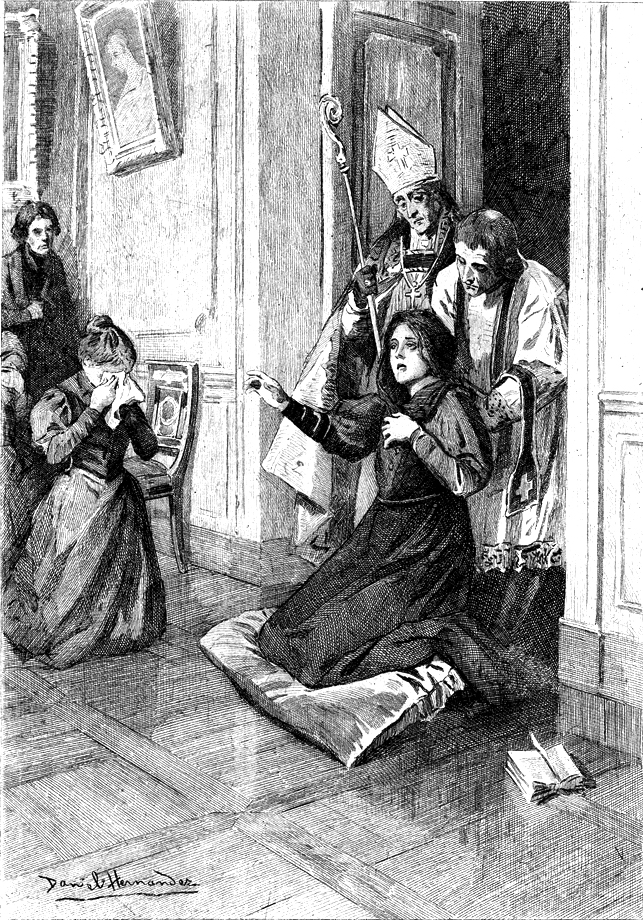
- Illustration from an 1897 edition by Daniel Hernández
- Author: Honoré de Balzac
- Language: French
- Series: La Comédie humaine
- Publisher: Hippolyte Souverain
- Publication date: 1841
- Publication place: France
- Preceded by: Le Médecin de campagne
- Followed by: Le Lys dans la vallée

Le Curé de village (The Village Priest) is a novel by Honoré de Balzac. It first appeared in La Presse in 1839. Frequently revised, the edited text was published as a separate volume in 1841. It covers themes that Balzac had already developed in le Médecin de campagne - improvements to living conditions in rural areas and redemption through self-sacrifice. It was first conceived as a detective novel and includes a mysterious death, with the attitude of its main character Véronique Graslin remaining mysterious until the end of the book.

== Summary ==
The only daughter of scrap metal dealers from Auvergne who managed to accumulate a large dowry by dint of economy, Véronique Graslin married a wealthy banker from Limoges, who neglected her for the benefit of his business. Its particular beauty attracts around it elements of the good society of the city, in particular the public prosecutor.

In Limoges, a crime moves the population: an old miser named Pingret has been robbed and murdered. The culprit is arrested, a porcelain worker named Tascheron, from the neighboring village of Montégnac. At first he denies it fiercely, but under the exhortation of the parish priest of Montégnac, Monsieur Bonnet, he ends up confessing to the murder and resigns himself to being condemned to death and executed by accepting the help of religion. To escape dishonor, the criminal's family emigrated to the United States, where they founded the prosperous town of Tascheronville in Ohio.

On the death of her husband, Véronique retired to Montégnac and henceforth devoted her life to others, an active form of a monastic retreat. In particular, she had irrigation works undertaken to fertilize the arid lands of the commune. She is the benefactress of the village, she is considered a saint. In fact, she atones for a terrible fault that she will reveal only when she dies.
