= The Red Inn (1923 film) =

1923 film directed by Jean Epstein

- Directed by: Jean Epstein
- Written by: Jean Epstein
- Based on: The Red Inn by Honoré de Balzac
- Starring: Gina Manès; Léon Mathot; Jean-David Évremond
- Cinematography: Raoul Aubourdier; Roger Hubert
- Production company: Pathé Frères
- Distributed by: Pathé Frères
- Release date: 28 September 1923
- Running time: 80 minutes
- Country: France
- Languages: Silent; French intertitles

The Red Inn (1923)

The Red Inn (French: L'Auberge rouge) is a 1923 French silent historical drama film directed by Jean Epstein and starring Gina Manès, Léon Mathot and Jean-David Évremond. It is based on the 1831 short story The Red Inn by Honoré de Balzac. Location shooting took place at the Château de Vincennes.

== Cast ==
- Gina Manès as La Fille de L'Aubergiste
- Marcelle Schmitt as Victorine
- Madame Delaunay as La Sorcière
- Clairette de Savoye as La Femme de L'Aubergiste
- Léon Mathot as Prosper Magnan
- Jean-David Évremond as Frédéric Taillefer
- Pierre Hot as L'Aubergiste
- Jacques Christiany as André
- Robert Tourneur as Herman
- Thomy Bourdelle as Le Hollandais
- Luc Dartagnan as Joueur D'Accordéon
- René Ferté as Juge
- Henri Barat as Juge
- André Volbert as Juge

== Bibliography ==
- Goble, Alan. The Complete Index to Literary Sources in Film. Walter de Gruyter, 1999.
- Neupert, Richard. French Film History, 1895–1946. University of Wisconsin Pres, 2022.
- Rège, Philippe. Encyclopedia of French Film Directors, Volume 1. Scarecrow Press, 2009.
