= Gaudissart II =

Short story by Honoré de Balzac

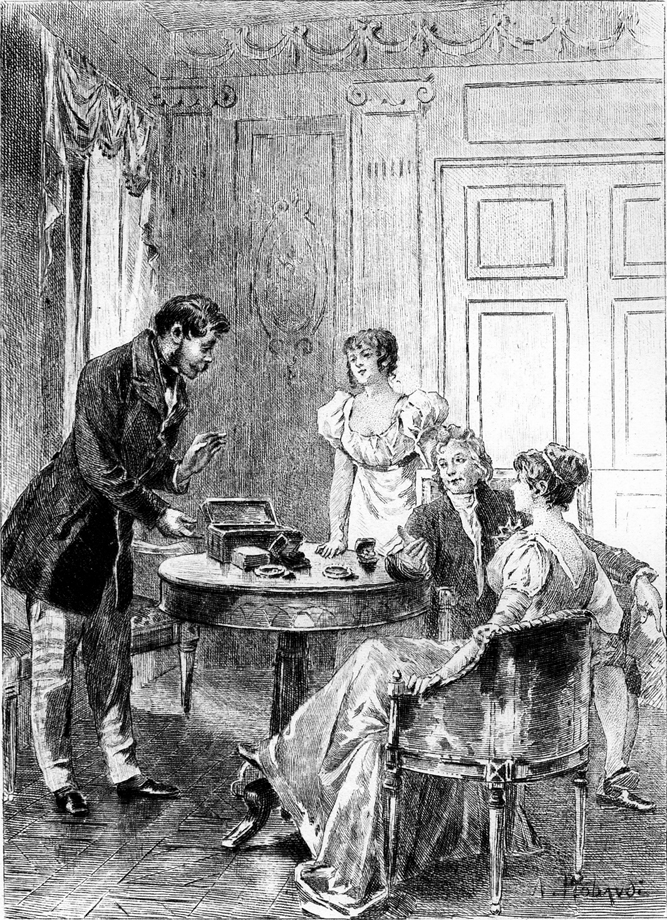
- Illustration by Alcide Théophile Robaudi
- Author: Honoré de Balzac
- Language: French
- Series: La Comédie humaine
- Publication date: 1844
- Publication place: France

Gaudissart II is a short story by Honoré de Balzac. It was published in 1844 and is one of the Scènes de la vie parisienne of La Comédie humaine.

== Plot summary ==
In this very short story, the owner of a Parisian shop sells a cheap shawl at an inflated price to a wealthy Englishwoman by pretending that it used to be owned by the Empress Joséphine.

== Theme ==
The story is named after a recurring Balzac character, Felix Gaudissart who does not appear in this story. He is a travelling salesman and the main character of L'illustre Gaudissart and also appears in a number of other books of La Comédie humaine. In Gaudissart II, his surname is used as a general term for salesmen, suggesting their similarities. The Parisian salesmen in the story are compared to both the fictitious Felix Gaudissart and the real life politician Talleyrand for their cunning. Talleyrand also briefly appears in Gaudissart II.
