= Une passion dans le désert =

Short story by Honoré de Balzac

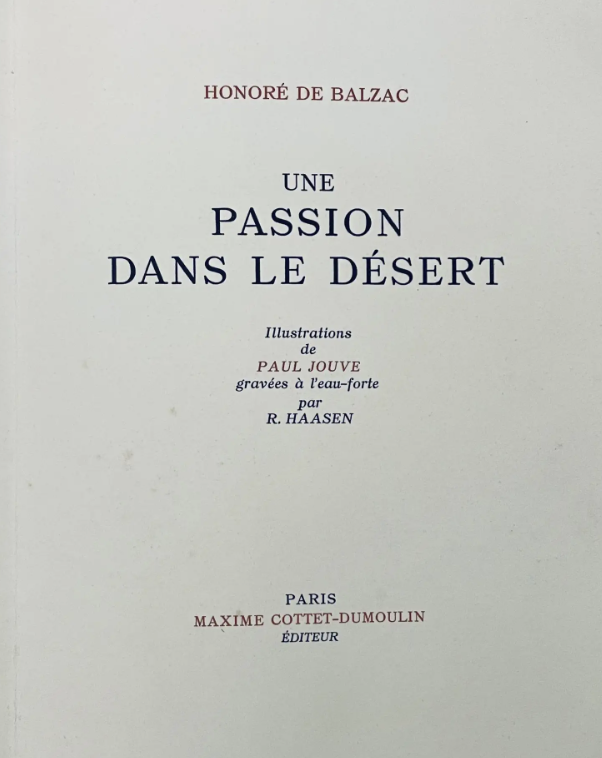
- Title page for Une passion dans le désert (1830)
- Author: Honoré de Balzac
- Language: French
- Series: La Comédie humaine
- Publication date: 1830
- Publication place: France

Une passion dans le désert (English "A Passion in the Desert") is a short story by Honoré de Balzac. It was published in 1830 and is one of the Scènes de la vie militaire of La Comédie humaine.

== Plot summary ==
The story is told in the first person by an unnamed narrator.

In the frame story, the narrator tells his companion, after attending a show in a menagerie, a story he heard from a former French soldier. The soldier had been captured during Napoleon's campaign in Egypt. He escaped from his captors with a horse, food and weapons. After the horse dies he finds refuge in a cave and manages to tame a panther with which he is somehow in love. He calls her "Mignonne", in memory of his former lover, and projects a number of feminine qualities on the beast. He sets off walking through the desert towards the Nile to be rescued, and is followed by the panther. He stabs the animal to death when he mistakenly thinks she is attacking him. He is rescued by soldiers who find him in tears. He somehow started carrying her skin around.The story finishes with the soldier telling the narrator of his regrets and of his experience of the desert.

== Adaptation ==
The story was the basis for an American film version in 1997, called Passion in the Desert.

== Themes ==
Balzac had planned to write a number of stories in the Scènes de la vie militaire section of La Comedie Humaine, but Une passion dans le désert was one of only two that were completed, the other being Les Chouans. However a number of works from other parts of La Comedie Humaine such as Le Médecin de campagne, Adieu, El Verdugo and others depict military scenes from the Revolutionary and Napoleonic Wars.
