= El Verdugo (short story) =

Short story by Honoré de Balzac

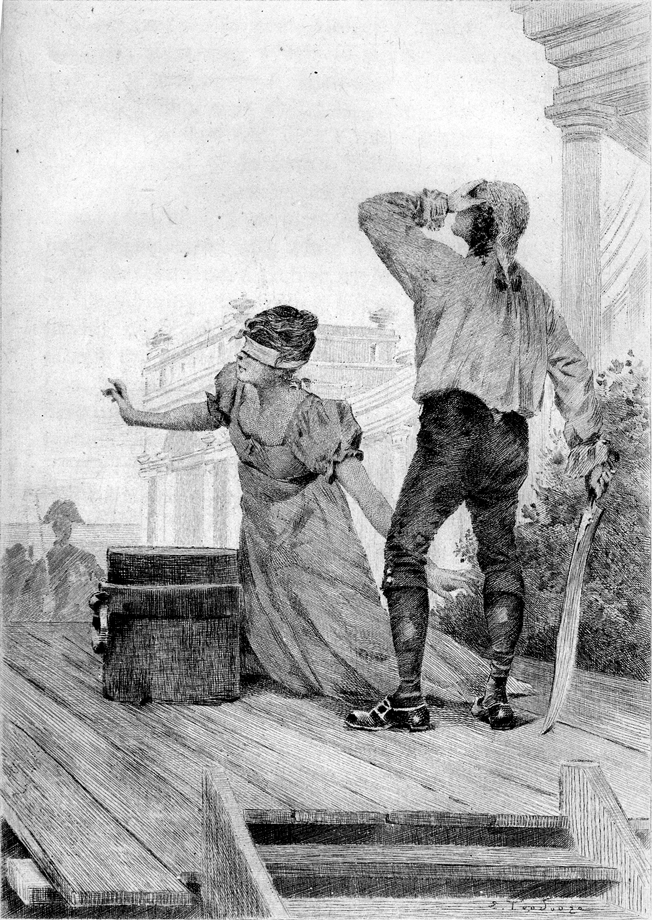
- Illustration by Édouard Toudouze
- Author: Honoré de Balzac
- Language: French
- Series: La Comédie humaine
- Publication date: 1830
- Publication place: France

El Verdugo is a short story by Honoré de Balzac, published in 1830. It is one of the Études philosophiques in La Comédie humaine.

== Plot summary ==
The story is set in Spain during the Peninsular War, in the coastal town of Menda. The occupying French garrison is commanded by a young officer named Victor Marchand, and he is in love with Clara, the daughter of Marquis Léganès, who is the local grandee. One night under cover of a local festival, there is an uprising against the French garrison, supported by British naval ships. The uprising is led by the Marquis and his sons. Marchand survives because he is warned by Clara, and as the last French survivor he flees to the nearby French military headquarters.

A few days later, the French retake Menda. The town surrenders without a fight, since the British had only sent ships with artillery, and no ground troops. The French general accepts the surrender, and promises not to loot and pillage the town in exchange for money, and the surrender of the leading citizens. The general then orders the hanging of the leaders of the uprising, including Marquis Léganès and his whole family.

Marquis Léganès asks the general, that he and his family be executed by beheading rather than hanging, and that his eldest son should be spared. The general agrees on condition that the son carry out the executions of his family. Léganès and the rest of his family persuade the eldest son, Juanito to agree. Marchand tries to persuade Clara that she will be spared if she agrees to marry him, but she refuses. Juanito then carries out the beheading of his father, two brothers and two sisters. The final intended victim is his mother which causes him to hesitate. She kills herself by jumping off the castle walls.

The story concludes by saying that Juanito does inherit his father's title. The King of Spain has given him the title of El Verdugo (the Executioner), but in his grief and guilt, Juanito shuns society.

== Themes ==
Sylvia Raphael wrote "..'El Verdugo' reminds us that the cruelty and heroism of war were as tragic in the days of the Peninsular War as they are now."

Balzac had planned to write a number of stories in the Scènes de la vie militaire section of La Comedie humaine, but only completed two, Les Chouans and Une passion dans le désert. However, El Verdugo is one of a number of works from other parts of La Comedie humaine along with Le Médecin de campagne, Adieu and others which depict military scenes from the Revolutionary and Napoleonic Wars.
