= Le shérif =

Opéra comique composed by Fromental Halévy

- Opéra comique by Fromental Halévy
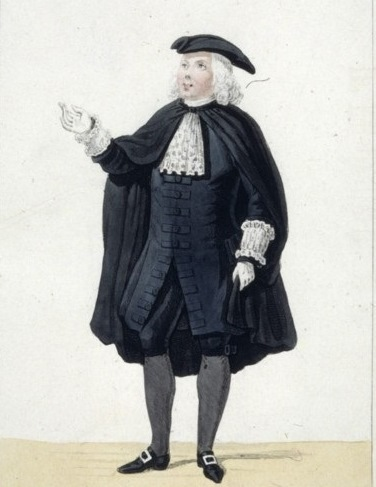
- François-Louis Henry in costume as Sheriff Turner for the premiere performance
- Librettist: Eugène Scribe
- Premiere: 2 September 1839; Théâtre de l'Opéra-Comique-Bourse, Paris

Le shérif (The Sheriff) is an opéra comique in three acts composed by Fromental Halévy to a libretto by Eugène Scribe. It was premiered by the Opéra-Comique at the Salle de la Bourse in Paris on 2 September 1839. Based on a short story by Balzac, the opera is set in the London Docklands during the late 18th century.

== Background and performance history ==
Scribe frequently borrowed from Balzac's collection of interlinked novels and stories, La Comédie humaine, for his plays and libretti. The basic plot of his libretto for Le shérif was taken from the Comédie humaine novella Maître Cornélius (Master Cornelius). Balzac's Master Cornelius is Louis XI's money-lender who lives in an old mansion where his gold keeps mysteriously disappearing. Scribe transferred the setting to late 18th-century London and provided a happy ending. Cornelius became Sir James Turner, the High-Sheriff of London. Like Cornelius, he is discovered as the thief of his own property which occurs while he is sleepwalking. However, unlike Cornelius who commits suicide on learning the truth, Sheriff Turner lives to tell the tale.

According to cultural historian Robert Letellier, Halévy's score for Le shérif revealed a "powerful originality", as had the scores for two of his previous opéras comiques, L'éclair and Les treize. However, the score's eclecticism proved unpopular with the Parisian public. Following its premiere on 2 September 1839 with François-Louis Henry in the title role, the opera ran for thirteen more performances at the Théâtre de l'Opéra-Comique-Bourse but was not revived there. A brief article in The Foreign Quarterly Review reported that Le shérif was given in Prague in early 1841 with a Czech libretto adapted by Alois Svoboda, but it was not a success "owing to the inefficient manner" in which the role of Sir James Turner was sung.

The opera's orchestral score was published by Maurice Schlesinger in 1839. The following year Stephen Heller composed his Op. 17, six caprices for piano based on an aria from Le shérif. Various fantasies based on the opera and arrangements for solo piano or violin were also published by minor composers such as Edouard Wolff, Henri Panofka, and Auguste Panseron.

== Roles ==
Role	Voice type	Premiere cast 2 September 1839 (Conductor: )
Sir James Turner, Sheriff of London	baritone	Henri (François-Louis Henry)
Amabel D'Invernesse, Irish gentleman	tenor	Théodore-Étienne Moreau-Sainti
Edgard Falsingham, a young corsair captain	tenor	Gustave-Hippolyte Roger
Keatt, Sir James Turner's cook	soprano	Laure Cinti-Damoreau
Camilla, Sir James Turner's daughter	soprano	Caterina Rossi
Yorik, a sailor		Fleury
Trim, a tavern keeper		Pallianti
Servant		Victor
Sailors, constables, servants
