= La Messe de l'athée =

Short story by Honoré de Balzac

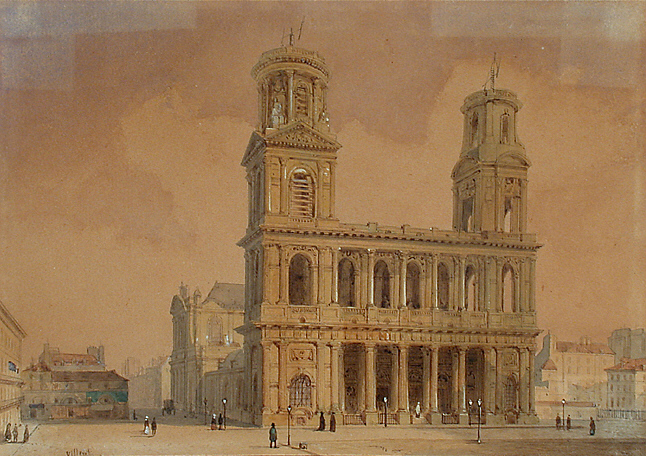
- Église Saint-Sulpice, illustration by François-Étienne Villeret
- Author: Honoré de Balzac
- Language: French
- Series: La Comédie humaine
- Publication date: 1836
- Publication place: France

La Messe de l'athée (English "The Atheist's Mass") is a short story by Honoré de Balzac, published in 1836. It is one of the Scènes de la vie privée in La Comédie humaine.

== Plot summary ==
The main character, Desplein, is a successful surgeon. One day, Doctor Horace Bianchon, his former assistant and friend, sees Desplein, an atheist, going into the Saint-Sulpice church, and, knowing Desplein and his strong atheistic beliefs, decides to follow him. He sees Desplein alone attending a mass. After Desplein departs, Bianchon questions the priest from whom he learns that Desplein attends a mass at the church four times a year (at the beginning of each season) which he himself pays for.

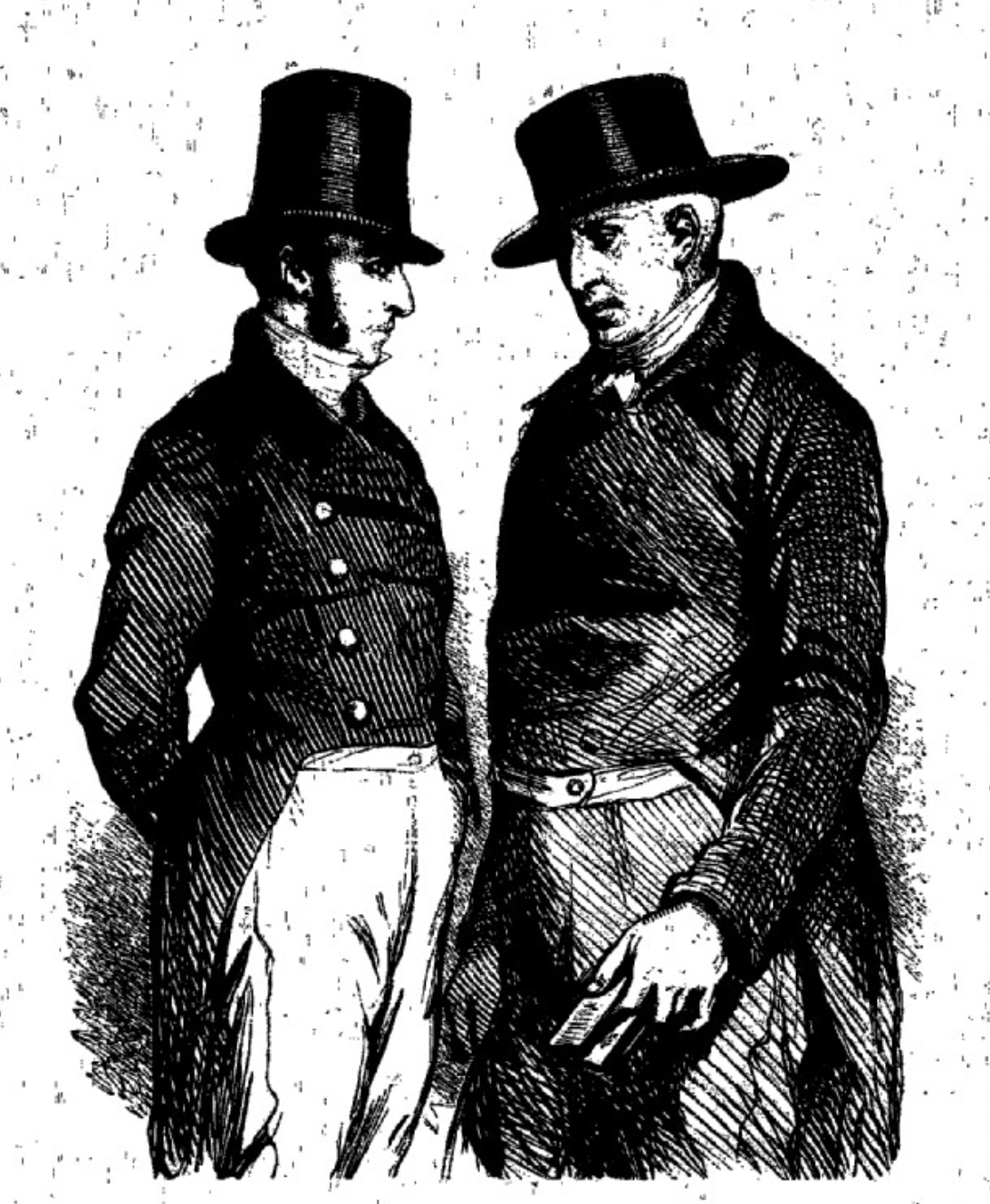
Desplein explaining to Bianchon, as depicted in an illustrated edition of the works of Balzac from 1852.

A few years later, Bianchon sees Desplein going into Saint-Sulpice for the mass again; but this time, he questions Desplein about it. Desplein explains that when he was a poor medical student, already desperate, his landlord evicted him from the modest building he lived in, along with Bourgeat, his elder Christian neighbour originating from Auvergne. Bourgeat offered to look for a new place for both of them and eventually found two cheap rooms in the attic of another building. Thenceforth, Bourgeat became a father figure to Desplein. He helped to pay for Desplein's education, and did menial tasks like cutting the wood. After Desplein became successful, he bought Bourgeat a horse and cart for his water carrying work; Desplein would not have been capable of escaping his misery without the help of his Christian friend.

Bourgeat became ill some time later, but Desplein was able to cure him; howbeit, the following year, Bourgeat contracted the same illness, and this time succumbed to it. On his deathbed, Desplein by his side, he expressed religious hopes, including, of course, the humble wish of going to heaven. Desplein, having lost probably his closest friend, decided to dedicate his thesis to Bourgeat and to pay for the seasonal masses every year, reciting the wished-for prayers on behalf of Bourgeat; Desplein claimed that the prayers were "all that a man who has [Desplein's] opinions could allow himself." Howsoever many times Desplein repeated the prayers, he swore that "he would give his fortune in order that the beliefs of Bourgeat enter his head."

The closing lines follow: "Bianchon, who treated Desplein whilst experiencing his last illness, today never dares confirm that the illustrious surgeon died an atheist. Believers would not like to think that the humble Auvergnat had come to open the doors of heaven for him, as he once opened the doors of the earthly temple whereabove one can read: to great men the homeland grateful."

== Recurring characters ==
Bianchon appears in several novels and stories of La Comédie humaine, including Le Père Goriot. He is the narrator of Étude de femme and La Grande Bretèche.

== Themes ==
Sylvia Raphael wrote "..the unselfish devotion of the humble water-carrier is matched only by the profound gratitude and deep religious feeling (in the broadest sense of those words) of the irascible, often selfish, eminent atheistic surgeon. Balzac's awareness of the complexity of human beings, of the coexistence within them of conflicting traits, comes out clearly in the story of Desplein who, self-centered and ambitious, forms a bond with the water-carrier which survives even the latter's death."
