= Maître Cornélius =

Short story by Honoré de Balzac

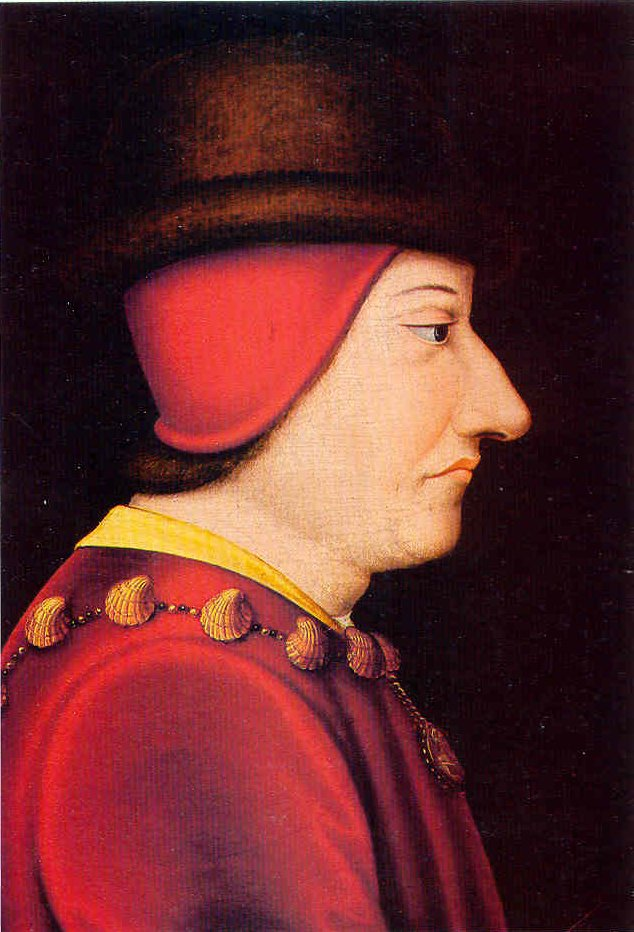
- Louis XI of France
- Author: Honoré de Balzac
- Language: French
- Series: La Comédie humaine
- Publication date: 1831
- Publication place: France

Maître Cornélius (English "Master Cornelius") is a short story by Honoré de Balzac. It was published in 1831 and is one of the Études philosophiques of La Comédie humaine.

== Plot summary ==
The story is set in Tours in 1479. It starts with Marie de Saint-Vallier, an illegitimate daughter of Louis XI attending mass at Tours Cathedral with her much older husband, the Comte de Saint-Vallier. He falls asleep, and Marie's lover Georges d’Estouteville comes over to speak to her. He tells her that he will meet her that night in her home, by breaking in from the home of Cornelius Hoogworst who lives next door.

Cornelius Hoogworst is a wealthy silversmith and merchant who does business with the King and wealthy courtiers. He is an elderly miser who lives with his sister in a big house and is originally from Ghent. During his time in Tours, his home has been robbed three times, and each time his apprentices were blamed, and executed. This has made him feared and hated in Tours.

Georges then presents himself to Cornelius, and asks to become his apprentice. He is accepted with the help of a forged letter from another merchant in Ghent. He is given a room in Cornelius' home, and during the night escapes next door for a rendezvous with Marie. Whilst this happens Cornelius' home is again robbed of valuable jewelry. So the next morning, Georges is arrested, because Cornelius has noticed that he was absent from his room. When Marie learns of the arrest of her lover, she immediately arranges to see her father, the King.

Marie and her husband travel to the King's residence at Plessis-lez-Tours on the outskirts of Tours. When she is alone with her father, she tells him that Georges could not have been the thief, because he was with her. She also says that she does not love her husband and is scared of him. The King then arranges for her husband to be sent on a diplomatic trip to Venice. He also summons Cornelius, and tells him that he will visit his home immediately.

The King goes to Cornelius' home to investigate the robbery. He inspects the strong room, and find that the locks have not been forced. He then orders that guards be set up to watch the house through the night. The next day, another theft from the strong room is discovered, but the lock was not forced. Cornelius was also seen outside during the night, though he has no memory of this. The King's doctor, then tells them that the explanation is that Cornelius is a sleep walker, and almost certainly has been robbing and hiding his own valuables.

As a result of this, Georges is spared. Cornelius is now treated with suspicion by the King, but is not punished. However he lives in torment because of the missing valuables, and the fact that he has lost the King's favour. Three years later, Cornelius commits suicide, without having found out where he put the stolen treasures.

== Background ==
Balzac was motivated to write this story to give a more favourable portrayal of Louis XI than that given by Walter Scott in Quentin Durward. He makes reference to Quentin Durward in the story, by correcting its description of Plessis-lez-Tours. He wrote "In spite of the singular fancy which possessed the author of “Quentin Durward” to place the royal castle of Plessis-lez-Tours upon a height, we must content ourselves by leaving it where it really was, namely on low land, protected on either side by the Cher and the Loire..."

== Adaptation ==
The story was adapted into the opéra comique, Le shérif (The Sheriff) composed by Fromental Halévy to a libretto by Eugène Scribe. It premiered in Paris at the Opera Comique in 1839.

Movie: L'argentier de Louis XI (1910)
