= Le Réquisitionnaire =

Short story by Honoré de Balzac

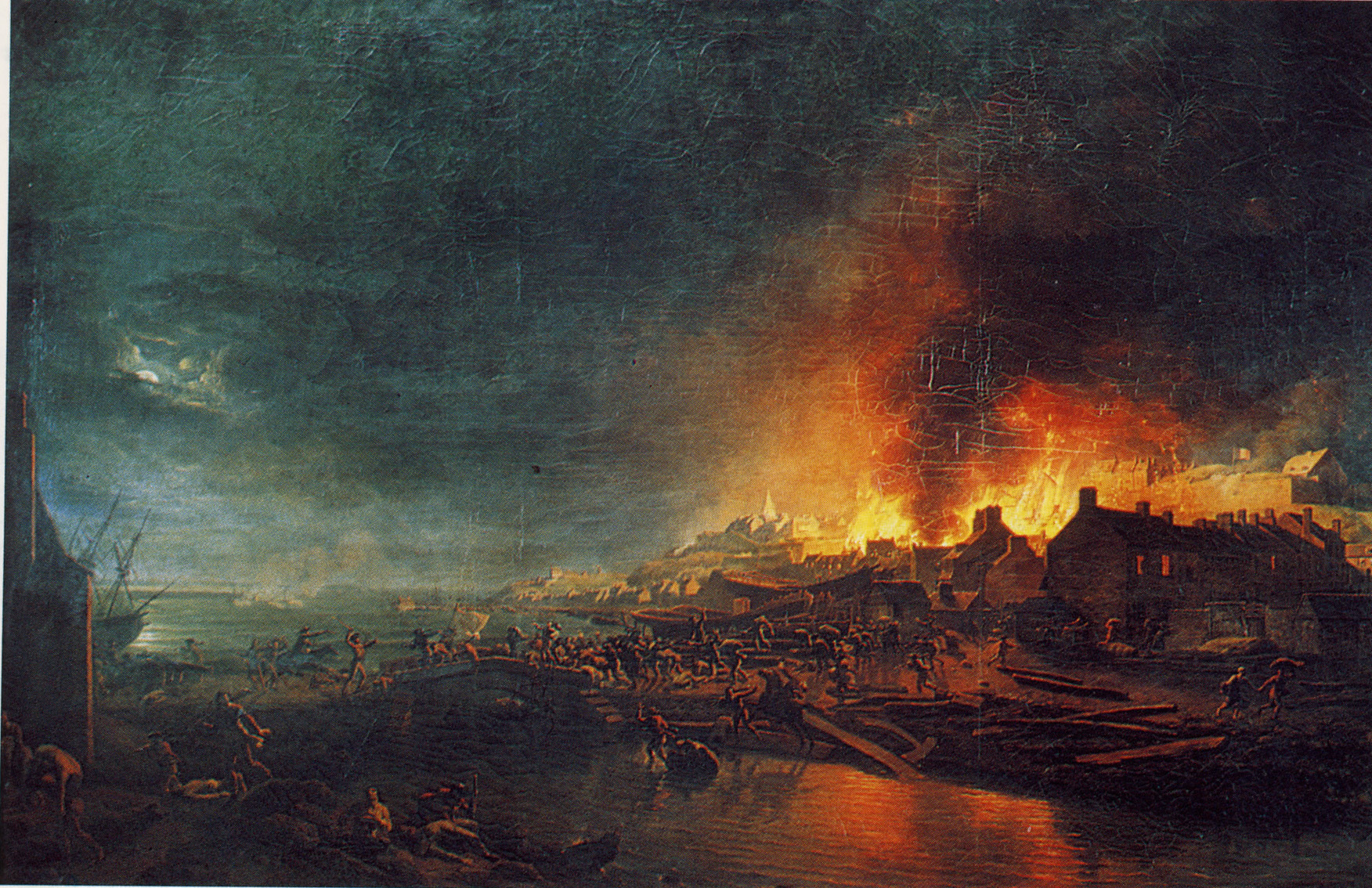
- Burning of Granville by the Vendéens, drawing by Jean-François Hue
- Author: Honoré de Balzac
- Language: French
- Series: La Comédie humaine
- Publication date: 1831
- Publication place: France

Le Réquisitionnaire (English "The Conscript" or "The Recruit") is a short story by Honoré de Balzac. It was published in 1831 and is one of the Études philosophiques of La Comédie humaine.

== Plot summary ==
The story is set in 1793 in Carentan, in Normandy. A local aristocrat, Madame de Dey lives at her estate at Carentan to ensure that it is not confiscated by the government. Her son is taking part in a Royalist uprising. She refuses visitors for two days, and buys a hare at the market. This arouses suspicions that she is either sheltering a Royalist priest or hiding a lover.

When visited by a local merchant, she admits that she has received a letter from her son. He has written that he was captured during a failed attack on Granville, but that he will escape, and take shelter with her. He mentions a three-day period during which he should be expected. She holds a social gathering at her home on the third night that her son is expected to arrive. She acts calmly, and all but the local prosecutor leave early. The prosecutor warns that he will have her house searched the next day. He hints that he might save her. He politely leaves when there is a knock on the door.

In the meantime, a group of conscripts is expected at the city, and one reports to a local official. He is billeted to stay at Madame de Dey's home.

The visitor who has knocked at Madame de Dey's door is taken to her son's room. She greets him, and is shocked to discover that it is not her son, but a Parisian conscript who has been billeted to her home. She dies that night, and on the same night her son is shot in Morbihan.

== Historical background ==
The story is set during the French Revolution. The main character's son is involved in the Vendéen Royalist Uprising. The story takes place in November 1793, shortly after a failed Royalist attack on Granville.

== Bibliography ==
- Raphael, Sylvia. "Introduction". Honoré de Balzac: Selected Short Stories. Penguin Classics, 1977.
