= La Grenadière =

Short story by Honoré de Balzac

- Title page for La Grenadière (1901 edition)
- Author: Honoré de Balzac
- Language: French
- Series: La Comédie humaine
- Publication date: 1832
- Publication place: France
- Preceded by: La Grande Bretèche
- Followed by: La Femme abandonnée

La Grenadière is a short story by Honoré de Balzac. It was published in 1832 and is one of the Scènes de la vie privée of La Comédie humaine.

== Plot summary ==
La Grenadière is the name of a farm house overlooking the Loire at Saint-Cyr-sur-Loire near Tours. A woman named Madame Willemsens comes to rent the house, and stays there with her two young sons Louis Gaston and Marie Gaston, and her elderly servant Annette. Her past life is not explained. She reveals to her older son, 13-year-old Louis that she is terminally ill. The family then spend the last few months of her life trying to enjoy their life and their idyllic surroundings. Louis also dedicates himself to study, particularly mathematics, as he plans to join the navy in order to support himself and his brother.

On her death bed, she asks Louis to write a letter to her husband Lord Brandon in England announcing her death. She also charges Louis to act as a father to Marie and gives him her entire life savings of 10,000 francs. Louis explains that he has already decided to give the funds to Annette who will care for Marie while he attends a technical college in Tours. Louis, meanwhile will join the French Navy in order to secure his fortune. Madame Willemsens is greatly consoled by Louis' maturity in the moments prior to her death.

== Setting ==
La Grenadière was the name of a real house in Saint-Cyr-sur-Loire where Balzac stayed for a few months in 1830 with his lover Laure de Berny. He attempted to buy the house in 1834, but the deal fell through because of lack of money.

== Recurring characters ==
Marie Gaston as an adult is also a character in the novel Mémoires de deux jeunes mariées. In this novel we learn about the adult lives of both Louis and Marie.

== Adaptation ==
An animated film adaptation of La Grenadière was released in 2006, directed by Kōji Fukada. It mixed painting with animation.
