= Un homme d'affaires =

Short story by Honoré de Balzac

Un homme d’affaires
- Author: Honoré de Balzac
- Language: French
- Series: La Comédie humaine
- Publication date: 1845
- Publication place: France

Un homme d’affaires (English "A Man of Business") is a short story by Honoré de Balzac. It was published in 1845 and is one of the Scènes de la vie Parisienne of La Comédie humaine. It was the only finished work that Balzac published in 1845.

== Plot summary ==
During a party held at the home of the courtesan, Malaga, the lawyer Desroches tells the other guests a story about aristocrat, Maxime de Trailles.

De Trailles has borrowed a lot of money and refuses to pay his debts. Two Parisian businessmen Cerizet and Claparon buy up de Trailles' notes from his debtors, and set out to collect the money owing. Cerizet attempts to recover the debt by visiting and confronting de Trailles demanding payment. De Trailles refuses.

Meanwhile, de Trailles has bought a reading room for his lover Mademoiselle Antonia Chocardelle to manage. At the suggestion of Croizeau, one the regular guests in the reading room, Antonia tells de Trailles about some valuable furniture that she wants to buy worth 4000 francs. She also says that she is bored of running the reading room. So they sell the reading room to a buyer who Croizeau has arranged for them, and bring the cash with them to buy the furniture. When they get to the place to buy the furniture, the owner turns out to be Cerizet in disguise. So Cerizet is able to obtain the full payment of the debts.
