= Le Message =

Short story by Honoré de Balzac

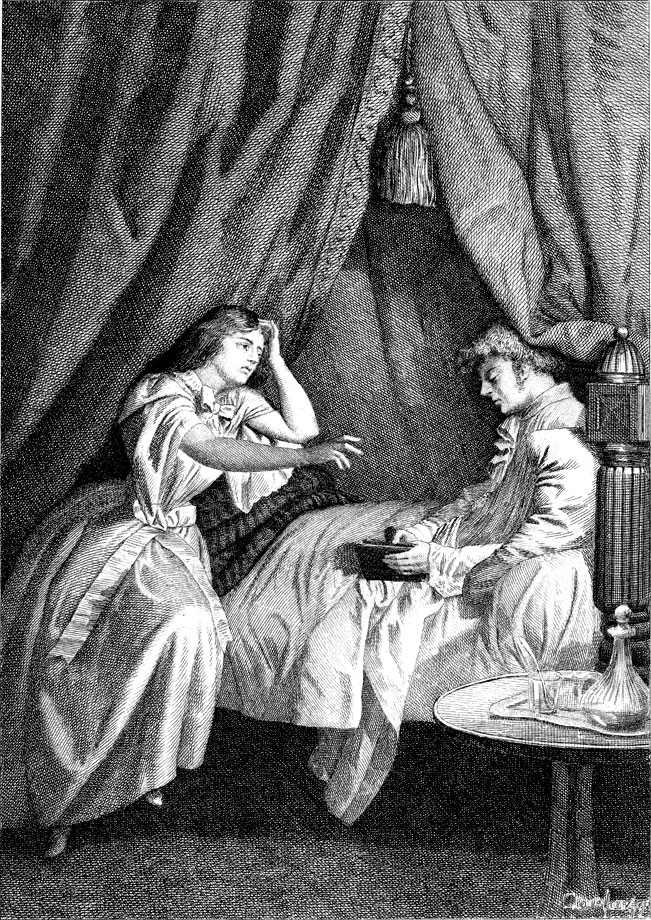
- Illustration by Stanisław Chlebowski
- Author: Honoré de Balzac
- Language: French
- Series: La Comédie humaine
- Publication date: 1832
- Publication place: France
- Preceded by: Une fille d'Eve
- Followed by: La Grande Bretèche

Le Message (English "The Message") is a short story by Honoré de Balzac. It was published in 1832 and is one of the Scènes de la vie privée of La Comédie humaine.

== Plot summary ==
The story is told in the first person by an unnamed male narrator. He recalls that in 1819, he was on a stagecoach from Paris to Moulins where he met another young man, and they discussed their love affairs with older married women. The stagecoach rolls over, and the other young man is fatally injured. Before he dies, he asks the narrator to go to his home, fetch the love letters from his lover and return them to her.

The narrator does as he is told, and goes to the château of Count and Countess de Montpersan outside Moulins to return the letters. There he informs the couple of the young man's death. The narrator is asked to stay for dinner by the count. However, the countess does not attend the dinner, and the narrator joins a search for her. He finds her in an outbuilding crying for her young lover.

Later that night, the countess visits the narrator's room to learn more of her lover's death, and he also returns the letters. When he leaves the next day, the count gives him some money which he asks him to return to a friend in Paris. On his return, the narrator learns that the money is actually for him, and that the countess has given him the money to pay for the expenses of his journey.
