= Madame Firmiani =

Short story by Honoré de Balzac

- Author: Honoré de Balzac
- Language: French
- Series: La Comédie humaine
- Publication date: 1832
- Publication place: France
- Preceded by: La Paix du ménage
- Followed by: Étude de femme

Madame Firmiani is a short story by Honoré de Balzac. It was published in 1832 and is one of the Scènes de la vie privée of La Comédie humaine. The title character was based on Balzac's older lover, Laure de Berny.

== Plot summary ==
Madame Firmiani is a beautiful young woman who is the subject of gossip in Paris. However, her husband's whereabouts are unknown. One day she receives a visit from Monsieur de Bourbonne, who is concerned about a rumour that his nephew Octave de Camps is having an affair with her, and has ruined himself financially because of her. Monsieur de Bourbonne is charmed by Madame Firmiani, but when he mentions that Octave is his nephew, the conversation is brought to an abrupt end.

The next day he visits his nephew Octave, who is making a living by teaching mathematics and living in poverty. Octave explains to his uncle that he and Madame Firmiani are in fact married, and that her first husband died in Greece in 1823. They are waiting for evidence of his death so that they will be able to inherit his money. Octave also says that he has renounced his late father's money, after Madame Firmiani learned that he had come by the money dishonestly. Octave also says that he has given most of his money to the Bourgneuf family whom his father had wronged. Madame Firmiani then comes in, and announces that she has finally received confirmation of her first husband's death. They are then all reconciled.
