= Pierre Grassou =

Short story by Honoré de Balzac

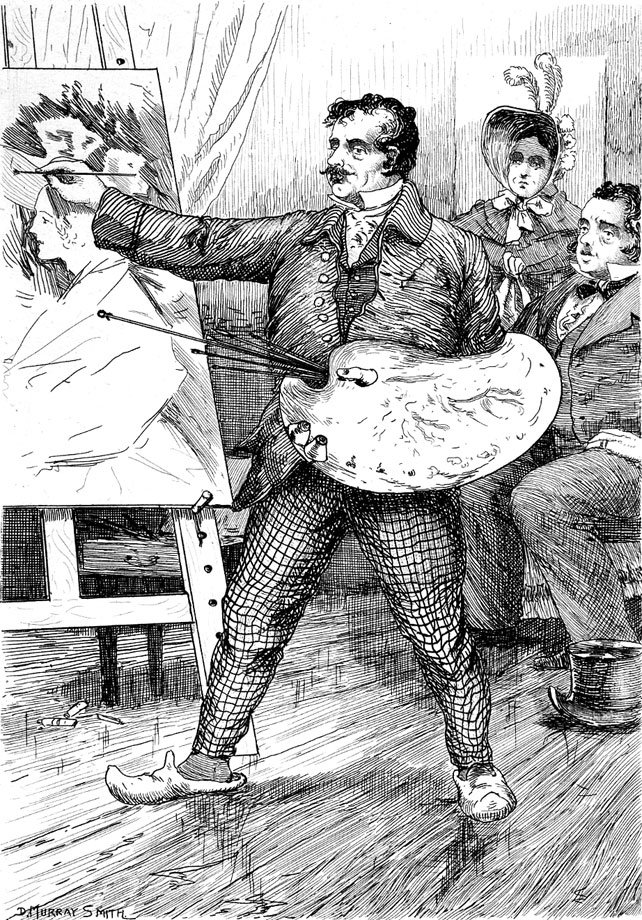
- Illustration of Honoré de Balzac's Pierre Grassou (1839)
- Author: Honoré de Balzac
- Language: French
- Series: La Comédie humaine
- Genre: Fiction
- Publication date: 1839
- Publication place: France
- Media type: Print

Pierre Grassou is an 1839 short story by French author Honoré de Balzac (1799–1850) and included in the Scènes de la vie privee section of his novel sequence La Comédie humaine.

== Plot ==
Pierre Grassou de Fougères is a mediocre and unoriginal painter who lives off painting imitative works commissioned by an old swindler and art-dealer named Elias Magus. Grassou paints works in the style of Titian, Rembrandt, and other famous artists. Magus passes these off as genuine and sells them for a large profit to members of the Petite bourgeoisie who are incapable of appreciating good art.

Monsieur Vervelle, a prosperous bottle-dealer obsessed with art, is introduced to Grassou by Magus, who introduces the painter as a grand master. Vervelle and his wife are enchanted with Grassou and believe he would make a good match for their daughter Virginie.

Grassou is invited to Ville-d'Avray, where the Vervelle mansion is garishly decorated, and also includes a large collection of Grassou's work, including the forgery of a Titian. Grassou recognizes his own mediocrity, but when it is discovered by the Vervelles that the forgeries in their home were painted by Grassou, “far from denting his reputation, multiples Grassou’s value as an artist” and as a son-in-law, since Vervelle believes Grassou to possess all the combined talent of Rubens, Rembrandt, Terburg, and Titian.

Despite his advantageous marriage, Grassou remains regretful that he is not a true artist. “This painter, a good father and a good husband, is unable to eradicate from his heart a fatal thought, namely, that artists laugh at his work; that his name is a term of contempt in the studios; and that the feuilletons take no notice of his pictures. But he still works on; he aims for the Academy, where, undoubtedly, he will enter."

== Themes ==
Sylvia Raphael wrote that the story "... contains amusing caricature of the bourgeois attitude to art, a good-natured portrait of the mediocre but financially successful painter, and a dig at the crafty trickery of the art dealer who trades on the vanity of the bourgeois, and the financial need of the artist."

== Bibliography ==
- Raphael, Sylvia. "Introduction". Honoré de Balzac: Selected Short Stories. Penguin Classics, 1977.
