= L'Elixir de longue vie =

Short story by Honoré de Balzac

L'Élixir de longue vie
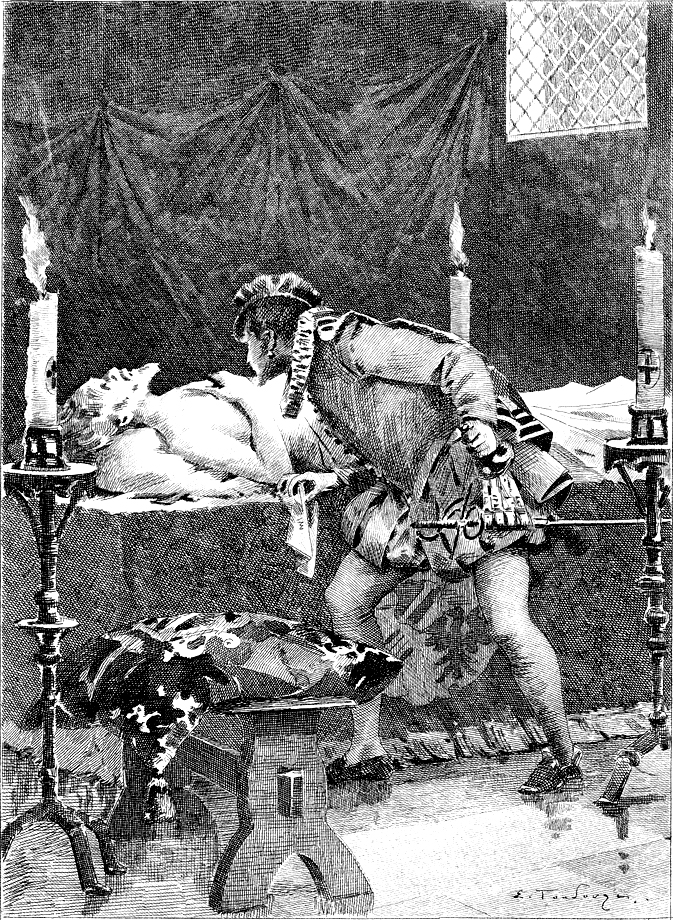
- Illustration by Édouard Toudouze
- Author: Honoré de Balzac
- Language: French
- Series: La Comédie humaine
- Publication date: 1830
- Publication place: France

L'Élixir de longue vie (English "The Elixir of Life") is a short story by Honoré de Balzac. It was published in 1830 and is one of the Études philosophiques of La Comédie humaine.

== Plot summary ==
The story starts in 16th century Ferrara in Italy. Don Juan Belvidero, the spoiled young son of wealthy nobleman, Bartolommeo Belvidero is having dinner with friends in the family palace, when he is told by a servant that his father is dying. He goes to his father's room. There his father tells him to fetch a phial of liquid from one of the drawers. His father orders Juan to rub this liquid over his body after he is dead, saying that it will restore him to life, and make him young again. Bartolommeo then dies. Juan does not immediately obey his father. After informing his guests of his father's death and seeing them off, he returns to his dead father's room, and puts one drop of the liquid from the phial on his father's eye. The eye comes back to life. After his initial shock, Don Juan kills his father's eye.

Having inherited his father's wealth, Juan continues his life of debauchery. He also secretly becomes an atheist. In his 60s, he settles down in Andalusia in Spain, and marries Dona Elvira, and they have a son, Felipe. He also chooses the Abbot of San-Lucar to be the confessor of his wife and son, and Felipe is raised to be religiously devout. On Juan's death bed, he tells his son Felipe about the phial of liquid, claiming that it is holy water. He orders his son to pour it over his body after he is dead. Felipe follows these orders, first pouring the liquid on his father's head, then on one of his arms. Juan's now living arm then grasps Felipe by the throat. A shocked Felipe faints, and the phial drops to the floor and breaks and all the rest of the liquid is lost. People rush into the room when they hear the noise, and see Don Juan's body with the head and one arm bought back to life and youth, and the rest still dead. They proclaim it to be a miracle.

The Abbot of San-Lucar claims that the miracle means that Don Juan is to be canonised as a saint. The half living body of Don Juan is then taken to the abbey church, and put into a reliquary. The Abbot celebrates a mass for Don Juan which is attended by many people. The angry head of Don Juan shouts blasphemies during the mass, detaches itself from the body, and then kills the Abbot by biting deeply into his head.

== Source ==
According to an introduction added to the story by Balzac, the idea for the story came from a friend of his who had read it in a short story collection. Balzac was not certain who the original author was, and thought that it may have been E. T. A. Hoffmann.
