= Z. Marcas =

1840 novel by Honoré de Balzac

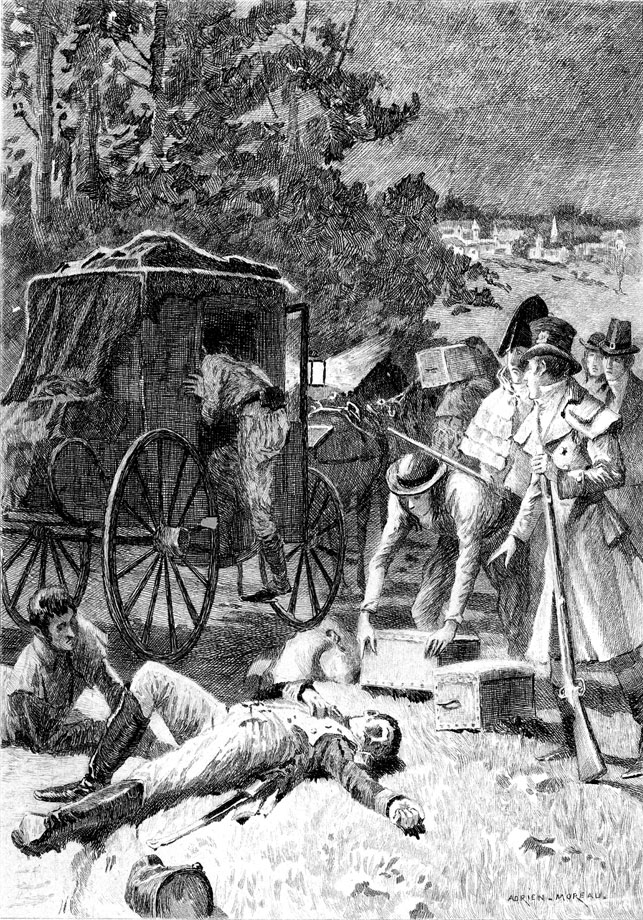
- 1897 illustration of Z. Marcas
- Author: Honoré de Balzac
- Illustrator: Adrien Moreau (1897 edition)
- Language: French
- Published: July 1840 in the magazine Revue Parisienne
- OCLC: 332863914 (2009 ed.)

Z. Marcas is a novelette by French author Honoré de Balzac first published in 1840. Set in contemporary Paris, it describes the rise and fall of a brilliant political strategist abandoned by the politicians he helps into power. Destitute and forgotten, he befriends a pair of students who live next door to him in a boarding-house. The story follows their many discussions about the political situation in France.

Balzac was inspired to write the story after spotting the name "Z. Marcas" on a sign for a tailor's shop in Paris. It was published in July 1840, in the Revue Parisienne, a magazine he had founded that year. One year later, it appeared in a collection from various authors under the title La Mort d'un ambitieux ("The Death of an Ambitious Man"). Balzac later placed it in the Scènes de la vie politique section of his vast novel sequence La Comédie humaine.

Although Z. Marcas features characters from other Balzac stories and elements of literary realism – both hallmarks of Balzac's style – it is remembered primarily for its political themes. Balzac, a legitimist, believed that France's lack of bold leadership had led to mediocrity and ruin, and that men of quality were being ignored or worse. He maintained that the youth of France were in danger of being abandoned by the government, and predicted unrest in the years to come.

The story also explores Balzac's conviction that a person's name is a powerful indicator of their destiny, an idea he drew from the work of Laurence Sterne. The title character, with his keen intellect, is based on Balzac's conception of himself: a visionary genius who fails to achieve his true potential because of less talented individuals with more social power.

== Background ==
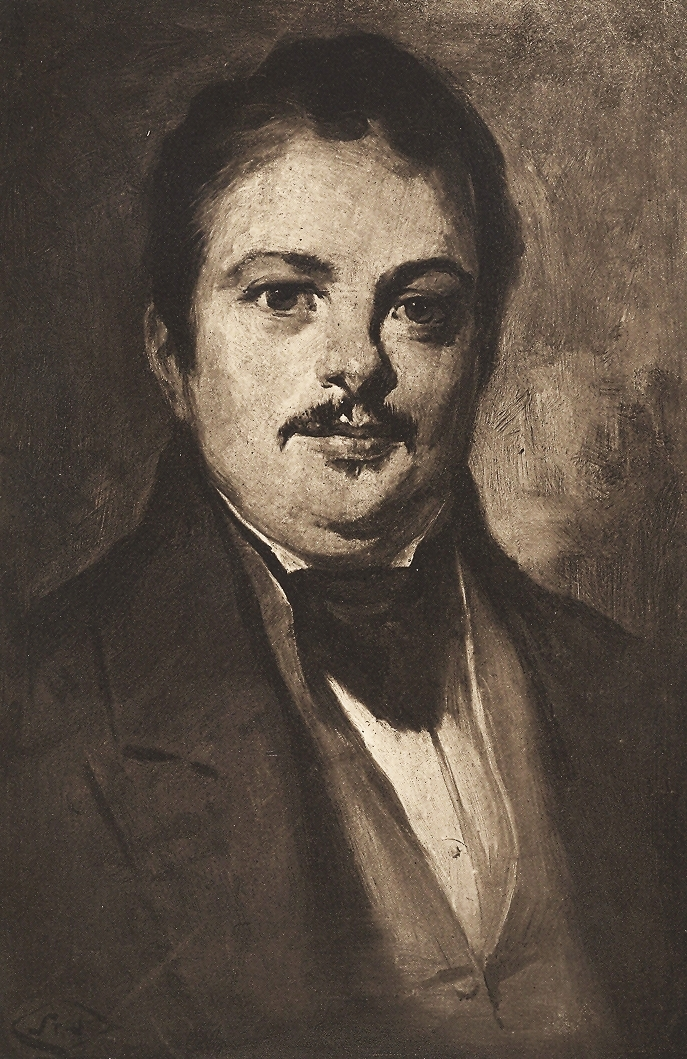
Balzac presented himself as a legitimist candidate for Parliament.

Honoré de Balzac was drawn to a diversity of interests throughout his life, from business to politics. After studying the law for three years, he wrote a number of potboiler novels under various pseudonyms. He also lost large sums of borrowed money in the publishing trade, attempting to capitalize on cheap editions of classical works. By 1828 he owed his mother 50,000 francs.

Although his views on politics were always changing, Balzac was primarily a legitimist who supported the House of Bourbon and believed that the July Revolution of 1830 had left France without strong leadership. In 1832 he declared his intent to run for the Chamber of Deputies in the French Parliament. A variety of problems prevented his actual candidacy, but he mounted a serious campaign which was met mostly with ridicule by the press. Referring to Balzac's breakthrough 1831 novel La Peau de chagrin ("The Wild Ass's Skin"), the newspaper Le Figaro mused: "This is the first time anyone has been seen caressing the voters with an ass's skin." Although he later showed renewed interest in public office, he mostly expressed his political views through writing.

In July 1840 he attempted to fuse his desire to make money with his politics by founding a magazine called the Revue Parisienne, funded by his friend Armand Dutacq. Having already worked in the publishing industry, Balzac believed he had learned all there was to know about the trade. "[T]hat gigantic machine known as journalism", he wrote, "is as simple as a roasting spit turned by a poodle." Balzac planned to publish his own fiction in the Revue Parisienne, in part to challenge the popularity of the roman-feuilleton serial format. Dutacq, however, stopped funding the project in September, after only three issues, and Balzac's final foray into the world of publishing came to an end.

== Writing and publication ==
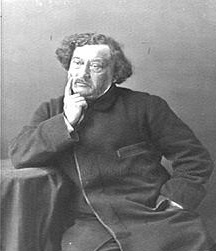
Balzac told his friend Léon Gozlan that "je ne suis pas seul à croire à cette alliance merveilleuse du nom et de l'homme". ("I am not alone in my belief in this marvelous alliance of the name and the man.")

In the summer of 1840, Balzac had a discussion with his friend Léon Gozlan about the power of a person's name. In his comic essay Balzac en pantoufles, Gozlan recounted his associate's insistence: "On est nommé là-haut avant de l'être ici-bas. C'est un mystère auquel il ne convient pas d'appliquer, pour le comprendre, les petites règles de nos petits raisonnements." ("We are named up there [in heaven] before being named down here. It's a mystery to which it's not suitable to apply, for the sake of understanding, the little rules of our slight reasoning.")

Balzac insisted to Gozlan that by searching through the streets of Paris, they would find a name suitable for a character he had imagined, a political genius thwarted by the mediocrity of the time. They finally came upon a tailor's sign that enraptured Balzac, bearing the name Z. Marcas. He believed that the name suggested "l'esprit je ne sais quoi de fatal" ("some mysterious fatality"), and chose it for his story's protagonist. He wrote the 30-page story soon afterwards.

Balzac published Z. Marcas in the first issue of the Revue Parisienne, 25 July 1840. It was republished a year later under the title La Mort d'un ambitieux ("The Death of an Ambitious Man"), in a collection from various authors called Le Fruit défendu ("Forbidden Fruit"). Shortly before his death, Balzac placed the story in the Scènes de la vie politique section of his collection La Comédie humaine.

== Synopsis ==
The story is told from the point of view of a first-person narrator, about whom little is revealed before the final pages. Before the story itself, an extended meditation appears on the nature of human names, and that of Z. Marcas specifically:

MARCAS! Répétez-vous à vous-même ce nom composé de deux syllabes, n'y trouvez-vous pas une sinistre signifiance? Ne vous semble-t-il pas que l'homme qui le porte doive être martyrisé? Quoique étrange et sauvage, ce nom a pourtant le droit d'aller à la postérité; il est bien composé, il se prononce facilement, il a cette brièveté voulue pour les noms célèbres ... Ne voyez-vous pas dans la construction du Z une allure contrariée? ne figure-t-elle pas le zigzag aléatoire et fantasque d'une vie tourmentée? MARCAS! say this two-syllabled name again and again; do you not feel as if it had some sinister meaning? Does it not seem to you that its owner must be doomed to martyrdom? Though foreign, savage, the name has a right to be handed down to posterity; it is well constructed, easily pronounced, and has the brevity that beseems a famous name ... Do you not discern in that letter Z an adverse influence? Does it not prefigure the wayward and fantastic progress of a storm-tossed life?

The narrator, Charles, lives with his friend Juste in a large boarding-house populated almost entirely with students like themselves (Charles is studying law and Juste medicine). The sole exception is their middle-aged neighbor, Z. Marcas, of whom they see only momentary glimpses in the hall. They learn that he is a copyist, and living on an extremely small salary. When the students find themselves lacking the funds for tobacco, Marcas offers them some of his own. They become friends, and he tells them the story of his political career.

Recognizing at an early age that he had an incisive mind for politics, Marcas had allied himself with an unnamed man of some fame who lacked wisdom and insight. They became a team, with the other man serving as the public face and Marcas as the advisor. Once his associate had ascended into office, however, he abandoned Marcas, then hired and abandoned him again. Marcas was left poor and unknown, resigned to duplicate the writing of others for very little pay.

Eventually his politician friend seeks his help for a third time. Marcas is dismissive, but the students convince him to give the process one last chance. After three months, Marcas appears at the boarding house again, sick and exhausted. The politician never visits Marcas, who soon dies. The students are the only mourners at his funeral, and – disheartened by the tragedy – leave France.

== Characters ==
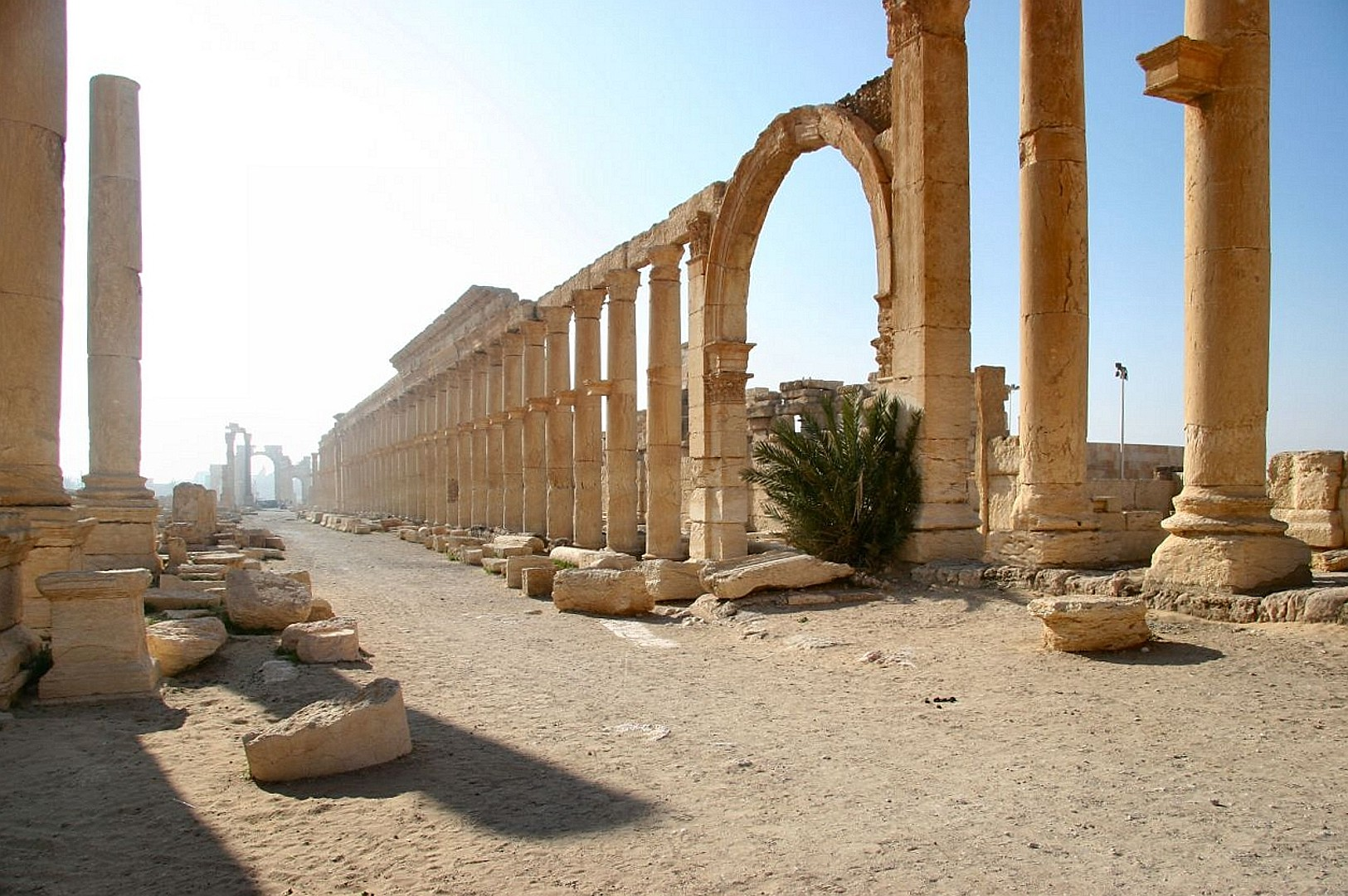
The students compare Z. Marcas to the failed ambition of bygone empires, and call him "les ruines de Palmyre au désert" ("The ruins of Palmyra in the desert").

In addition to his distinctive name, Z. Marcas has a remarkable appearance which his neighbors notice immediately. The story's first line refers to his "saisissant" ("striking") appearance. As usual in his later work, Balzac describes Marcas by relating him to an animal: "L'animal de Marcas était le lion. Ses cheveux ressemblaient à une crinière, son nez était court, écrasé, large et fendu au bout comme celui d'un lion, il avait le front partagé comme celui d'un lion par un sillon puissant, divisé en deux lobes vigoureux." ("The animal for Marcas was the lion. His hair was like a mane, his nose was short and flat; broad and dented at the tip like a lion's; his brow, like a lion's, was strongly marked with a deep median furrow, dividing two powerful bosses.")

Marcas appears to be destined for greatness; he is described as having tremendous spirit, sound but speedy judgment, and comprehensive knowledge of public manners. His gaze has "une puissance" ("a power"), which he tries not to use, since it has brought him nothing but misery in the past. Despite these innate proficiencies, however, the political genius living in the students' midst requires their aid to dress himself when official company comes to call.

The character of Z. Marcas nonetheless represents a fiery drive to succeed in the world of politics, an acute mind seeking to do good in the public sphere. One critic calls him "ambition in its pure state". Like other persons of genius in La Comédie humaine, Marcas is seen as a reflection of Balzac's own ego and desire. Like Marcas, the author dreamed of fame and positive influence; as Balzac believed himself to be, the character is dismissed and manipulated by mediocre minds. Even their work habits – toiling at their desks throughout the night – are similar.

=== Recurring characters ===
Balzac began using characters from earlier works in his 1835 novel Le Père Goriot, and made the technique a hallmark of his fiction. In the case of Z. Marcas, the narrator – Charles Rabourdin, whose identity is only revealed at the end of the story – is in fact the son of a central character from Balzac's 1837 tale La Femme supérieure. The title character of that story is married to Xavier Rabourdin, who is unjustly ignored for a promotion to the head of his civil service department. At the end of the La Femme supérieure, Rabourdin pledges to his wife that they will enjoy success in the world of business. His son's poverty in Z. Marcas is evidence of his failure.

Charles Rabourdin's interactions with Marcas echo the difficulties he saw in his father's government career. As critic Herbert J. Hunt notes, Marcas "represents in the political sphere what Rabourdin represents in the administrative sphere". Allan H. Pasco echoes this point: "Charles has had the lesson of futility from two tutors: his father and Marcas. Outstanding men have no future in politics, in the administration, or in business – at least not in France."

Balzac's use of recurring characters provides unparalleled depth and characterization for his readers. "This technique", insists critic Mary Susan McCarthy, "not only furnished him with a unifying principle but also offers the reader a network of relationships through which to unite the many separate stories and novels in which the characters appear, forming the fictional universe that is La Comédie humaine." Some readers, however, are intimidated by the depth created by these interdependent stories, and feel deprived of important context for the characters. Detective novelist Arthur Conan Doyle said that he never tried to read Balzac, because he "did not know where to begin".

Z. Marcas himself appears in one other Balzac story, Un prince de la bohème, which the author revised twice before it appeared in its final form. In the 1846 edition, the character of Marcel has been changed to Marcas; but this may have been a printer's error. As Anthony Pugh explains: "This detail is inexplicable; the principal character of Z. Marcas, who does not otherwise appear outside his own story, seems a very unlikely candidate for the role. Could it be a misprint?"

== Style ==
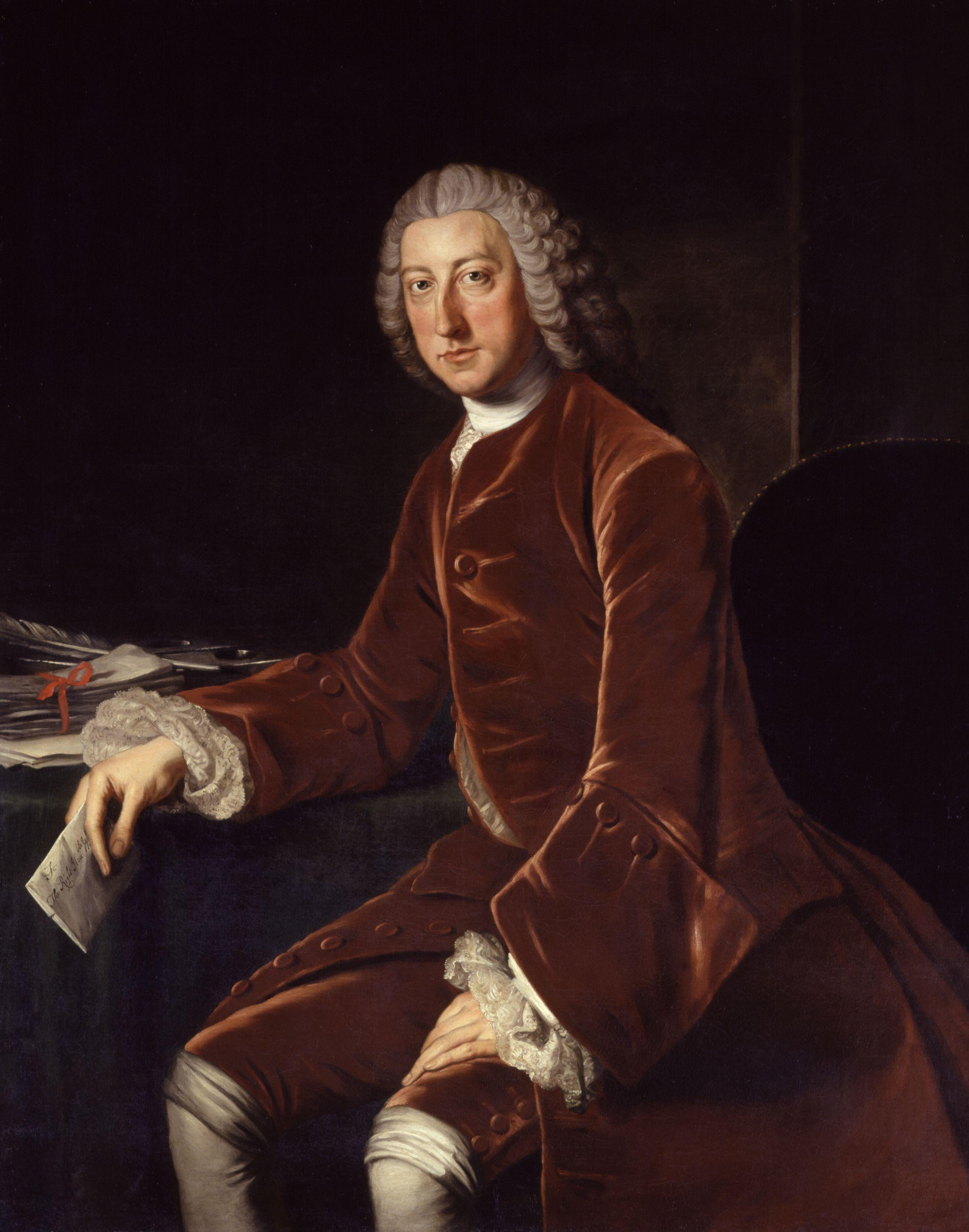
The narrator declares that Marcas is "semblable à Pitt, qui s'était donné l'Angleterre pour femme" ("like Pitt, who made England his wife").

Balzac was known for his use of realism, including exquisite detail when describing people and locations. His fanaticism about the name Z. Marcas is cited as an example of the author's "zeal" for "close local color". Balzac's belief in the connection between one's name and one's destiny is brought to the fore; the pattern demonstrated in Z. Marcas reflects many in the larger collection of Balzac's work. As critic Charles Affron puts it: "The creator of a universe so tied up with inner rhythms and resounding with so many echoes does not hesitate to imply that the germs of a character's failure can be found in the physical qualities of his name." This idea came to Balzac from Laurence Sterne, as he acknowledged in his 1841 story Ursule Mirouët: "[N]e doit-on pas reconnaître avec Sterne l'occulte puissance des noms, qui tantôt raillent et tantôt prédisent les caractères?" ("Should we not agree with Sterne in recognizing the occult power in names, which sometimes mock and sometimes define the characters of their possessors?")

Z. Marcas includes many other examples of realist detail as well. The students live in shabby environs, furnished by "qu'un maigre tapis en lisière" ("only a scrap of thin carpet"). They share "une blonde perruque de tabac turc" ("a tawny twig of Turkish tobacco") with their neighbor, and the three discuss political personalities drawn directly from recent history, including William Pitt the Elder and the Voltigeurs. Still, realist detail is not commonly in the foreground of commentary about Z. Marcas. As Hunt explains, it is mostly remembered "as a vehicle for a characteristic Balzacian whimsy".

== Politics and society ==
Z. Marcas is best known for its reflection of Balzac's political views, specifically the neglect of talent and ability in a sea of republican mediocrity; and the abandonment of young people by older generations. Pasco suggests: "'Z. Marcas' has then become, not the story of one particular, political failure, not the story of a young man of potential who abandons France for Malaysia, but the story of France herself, wasting away and thus losing her greatest resource – her youth."

Balzac believed that the July Monarchy had brought a wave of poor leadership, and that people of quality and integrity were scorned in the name of cronyism. Marcas, a prime example of such a man, is doomed to fail in the government of Louis-Philippe. Those in power were blind to the valuable minds being lost in their midst, as the students discover early in the story: "nous étions étonnés de la brutale indifférence du pouvoir pour tout ce qui tient à l'intelligence, à la pensée, à la poésie" ("we were amazed at the brutal indifference of the authorities to everything connected with intellect, thought, and poetry"). Marcas' personal woes – and his tales of life within the corridors of power – strongly reinforce this view.

Through Marcas, Balzac claimed that young people in France were being ignored by government officials, and predicted an uprising:

La jeunesse éclatera comme la chaudière d'une machine à vapeur. La jeunesse n'a pas d'issue en France, elle y amasse une avalanche de capacités méconnues, d'ambitions légitimes et inquiètes, elle se marie peu, les familles ne savent que faire de leurs enfants; quel sera le bruit qui ébranlera ces masses, je ne sais; mais elles se précipiteront dans l'état de choses actuel et le bouleverseront. Youth will explode like the boiler of a steam-engine. Youth has no outlet in France; it is gathering an avalanche of underrated capabilities, of legitimate and restless ambitions; young men are not marrying now; families cannot tell what to do with their children. What will the thunderclap be that will shake down these masses? I know not, but they will crash down into the midst of things, and overthrow everything.

As Graham Robb indicates in his 1994 biography, Balzac's words were an accurate prediction of the 1848 Revolution. Public opposition to the monarchy exploded in February of that year, Louis-Philippe was forced to abdicate, and the Second Republic was founded.

== Legacy ==
Although Balzac's Revue Parisienne lasted only three issues, Z. Marcas has remained a moderately popular story. Hunt notes that it has "only subsidiary value", but biographer André Maurois calls it "an admirable tale". Robb notes that Z. Marcas was an important herald of political realities to come, and provided a warning to the political class of the time.

As critic Félicien Marceau points out, however, the greatest value of Z Marcas may have been for the author himself.

[T]he story has somewhat the appearance of those drawings by Leonardo da Vinci consisting of twenty or thirty feet or hands, perfectly drawn in themselves, but whose raison d'être lies rather in the fact that they will enable the artist to address himself later on to much vaster compositions, in which such hands and feet will assume their true placement and importance. We shall find the traits gathered together in the character of Marcas—though more scattered, mingled with others, scaled down to less overwhelming proportions—in [Eugène de] Rastignac or [Henri de] Marsay, whose characters are less of a piece but more true to life. Marcas, on the other hand, is less a character than a moral example.
