= Facino Cane (short story) =

Short story by Honoré de Balzac

- Short story by Honoré de Balzac
- Country: France
- Language: French

Publication
- Publisher: Chronique de Paris
- Publication date: March 17 1836
- Series: La Comédie humaine

"Facino Cane" is an 1836 short story by French author Honoré de Balzac (1799-1850) and included in the Scènes de la vie parisienne section of his novel sequence La Comédie humaine. It first appeared in the Chronique de Paris on March 17, 1836 and in 1837 was classified by Balzac as a Philosophical Study (Étude philosophique). In 1843, it appeared with Balzac's novel Albert Savarus. In 1844, it became part of Balzac's La Comédie humaine.

== Plot ==
Facino Cane is told in the first person by an unnamed narrator. It concerns a blind old man named Marco-Facino Cane, called "Father Canet", who claims to be a descendant of the 14th century condottiere of the same name. Father Canet is a pensioner in the Hôpital des Quinze-Vingts and a clarionet-player. The narrator meets Facino Cane at the wedding celebration of his maid's sisters. His interest being piqued by the appearance of the old man, the narrator begins a conversation with him, and Facino Cane mentions being from Venice. When the narrator then mentions he would like to visit Venice, Facino Cane begs to be taken there. He then tells the story of his life and how he lost his status and money and became blind. The narrator promises to take Facino Cane with him to Venice some day, but the old man dies that winter.
