= Jésus-Christ en Flandre =

Short story by Honoré de Balzac

- Author: Honoré de Balzac
- Language: French
- Series: La Comédie humaine
- Publication date: 1831
- Publication place: France

Jésus-Christ en Flandre (English "Christ in Flanders") is a short story by Honoré de Balzac. It was published in 1831 and is one of the Études philosophiques of La Comédie humaine.

== Plot summary ==
The story is told in the first person by an unnamed narrator. In the first half he tells the story of a miracle that occurred in Flanders at some unspecified time in the past. A small boat is about to make a voyage from the island of Cadzand to Ostend. The wealthy passengers sit in the stern, and the poorer ones at the front. The crew are rowing in the middle. At the last minute a stranger boards the boat. The rich passengers will not make room for him so he has to sit with the poorer passengers. It then sets off to Ostend. During the journey, there is a storm, and the boat is soon in danger. The stranger gives a message of reassurance to the poorer passengers, whilst the wealthier passengers view him with disdain or skepticism. The boat capsizes a short distance from Ostend. The stranger walks on the water to the shore, and poorer passengers walk with him to safety at a house on shore. The wealthy passengers drown. The stranger then goes back to the water to rescue the boat's captain and takes him back to the house. It is realised afterwards that the stranger was Jesus Christ.

A convent was built on the spot of the miracle.

In the second half of the story, the narrator visits the convent's church in Flanders in 1830 just after the July Revolution. When he is there he has a vision of meeting an old woman in the church. He follows her to her home, and there she briefly transforms into a young woman who shows him a vision of churches. He then is woken up by an attendant in the convent church and realises he was dreaming. The narrator sees the dream as a message to defend the church.
