= Le Contrat de mariage =

1835 novel by Honoré de Balzac

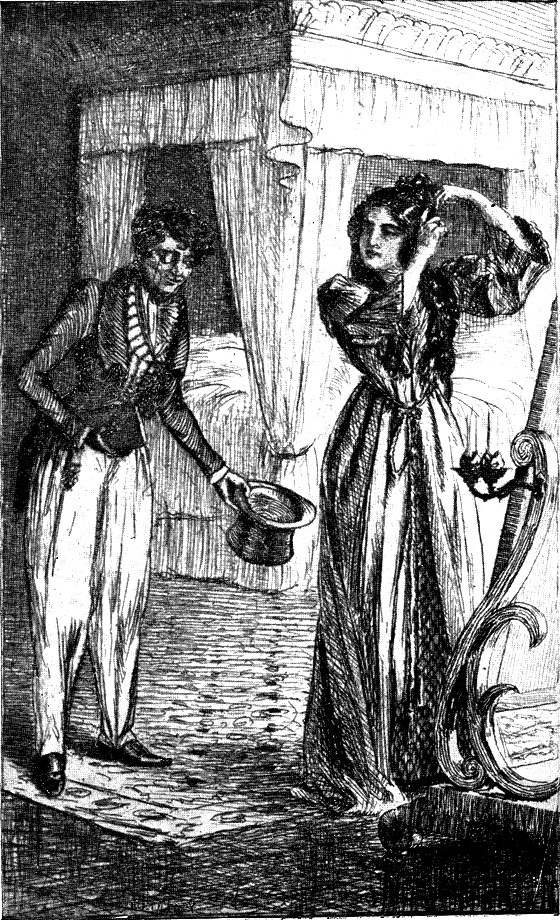
- An 1899 illustration by W. Boucher for Le Contrat de mariage
- Author: Honoré de Balzac
- Language: French
- Series: La Comédie humaine
- Genre: Novel
- Publication date: 1835
- Publication place: France
- Media type: Print (Hardback & Paperback)
- Pages: 150 pp

Le Contrat de mariage (English: A Marriage Contract or A Marriage Settlement) is an 1835 novel by French author Honoré de Balzac (1799–1850) and included in the Scènes de la vie privée section of his novel sequence La Comédie humaine. Set in Bordeaux, it describes the marriage of a Parisian gentleman, Paul de Manerville, to the beautiful but spoiled Spanish heiress, Natalie Evangelista.

== Plot summary ==
Paul de Manerville is a gentleman born of wealth and nobility who decides, over the objections of his worldly friend de Marsay, to give up his elegant bachelor's life and get married at the age of twenty-seven. He falls in love with a beautiful girl named Natalie Evangelista, the daughter of a proud Spanish matriarch whose financial assets have been diminishing since the death of her husband. Too naïve and full of illusions to see the hidden motives of Natalie Evangelista's mother, who wants Paul's wealth in order to procure for her daughter the lavish lifestyle she believes to be her birthright, or to recognize that his bride's loyalty is entirely with her mother and not with him, Paul gets himself stuck in a frigid and childless marriage. So strong are his illusions, that even at the end of the novel he remains unaware of his wife's infidelities.

== Literary significance & criticism ==
A Marriage Contract is one of Balzac's great studies of human illusions, in this case the illusions of married life. Paul is a subtly conveyed example of the husband, "the voluntary dupe" who prefers "to suffer rather than complain." The novel is notable for treating not only the courtship leading up to the marriage, but the negotiations which follow. A Marriage Contract also has one of Balzac's classic dissections of the techniques and wiles of professional negotiators.
