= Un drame au bord de la mer =

Short story by Honoré de Balzac

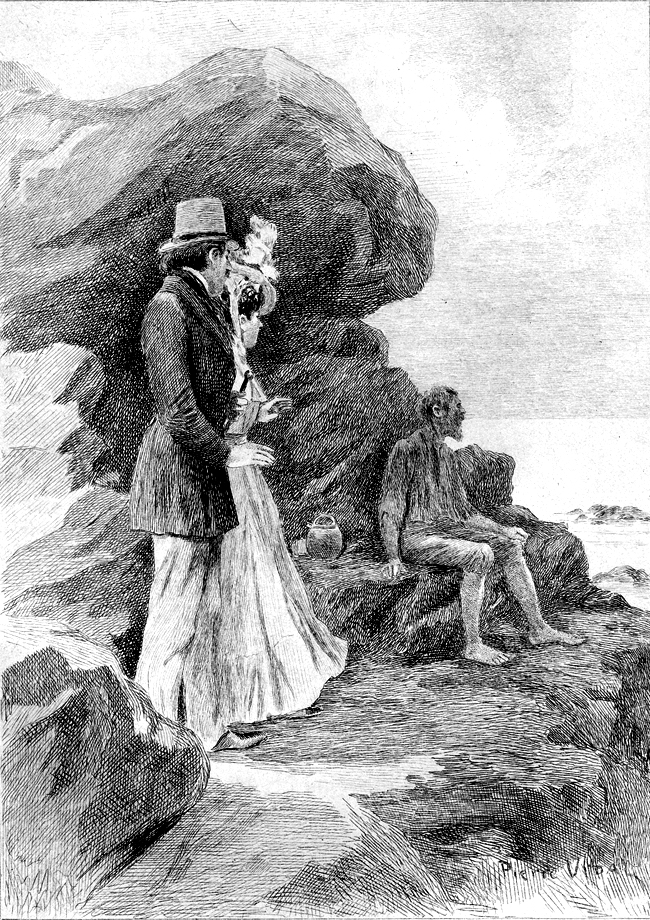
- Illustration by Pierre Vidal
- Author: Honoré de Balzac
- Language: French
- Series: La Comédie humaine
- Publication date: 1834
- Publication place: France

Un drame au bord de la mer (English "A Drama on the Seashore") is a short story by Honoré de Balzac. It was published in 1834 and is one of the Études philosophiques of La Comédie humaine.

== Plot summary ==
The story is told in the first person by a young writer named Louis Lambert. He and his lover Pauline are holidaying in the coastal town of Le Croisic. They meet a poor fisherman, and ask him to guide them to a local landmark on the coast. On the way they pass a small cave where a man lives in isolation. Louis and Pauline ask the fisherman to tell them the story of the man in the cave.

The man is named Pierre Cambremer. He was a fisherman with a wife and a son named Jacques. Jacques was a young man who liked to drink and gamble, and had one day stolen a gold coin which his mother had sewn into a quilt. His father discovered this, and punished the son by tying him up, and throwing him into the sea. Pierre's wife died shortly afterwards. Pierre in his grief left his home, and eventually settled in the cave by the sea. His only contact is with his young niece who brings him food. The other locals avoid him.

Louis and Pauline are so affected by this story, that they abandon their holiday, and Louis writes to his uncle telling him the story. At the start of the story Louis had felt happy and optimistic, but at the end he starts to feel the onset of mental health issues.

== Recurring characters ==
Louis Lambert is also the title character of the novel Louis Lambert.

== Adaptations ==
The story was adapted into a French 1920 silent movie directed by Marcel L'Herbier called L'Homme du large.
