= The Quest of the Absolute =

1834 novel by Honoré de Balzac

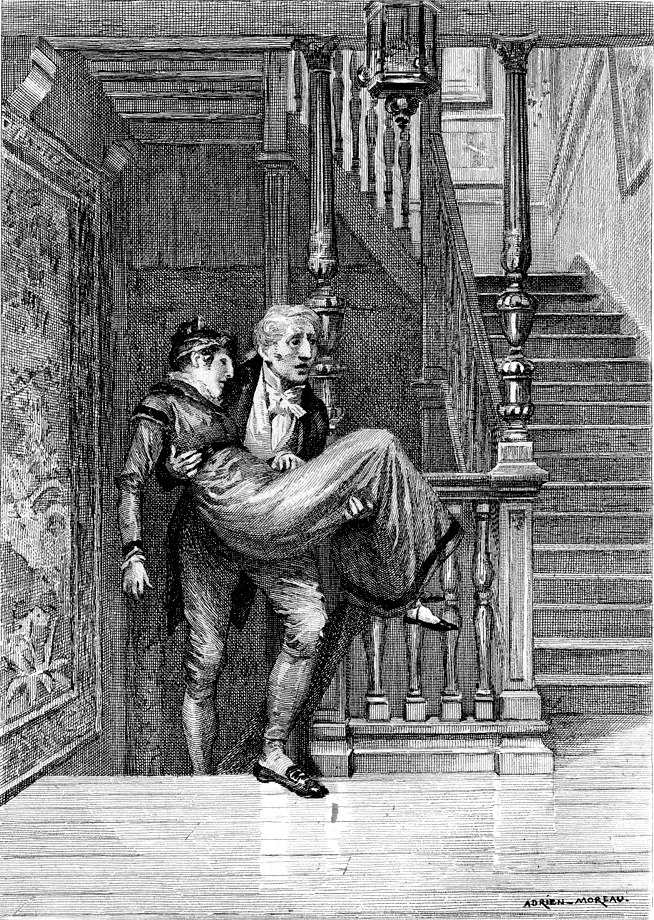
- Author: Honoré de Balzac
- Original title: La Recherche de l'absolu
- Illustrator: Édouard Toudouze
- Language: French
- Series: La Comédie humaine
- Publication date: 1834
- Publication place: France

The Quest of the Absolute (French: La Recherche de l'absolu) is a novel by Honoré de Balzac. The novel first appeared in 1834, with seven chapter-divisions, as a Scène de la vie privée; was published by itself in 1839 by Charpentier; and took its final place as a part of the Comédie in 1845.

The astronomer Ernest Laugier helped Balzac in the use of chemical terminology in this novel.

== In popular culture ==
In François Truffaut's 1959 film The 400 Blows, teenager Antoine Doinel idolizes Balzac's work and depicts 'my grandfather's death' in a school essay, based on the plot of The Quest of the Absolute, leading his teacher to accuse of him of plagiarizing, causing him to quit school.
