= La Fausse Maîtresse =

1843 novel by Honoré de Balzac

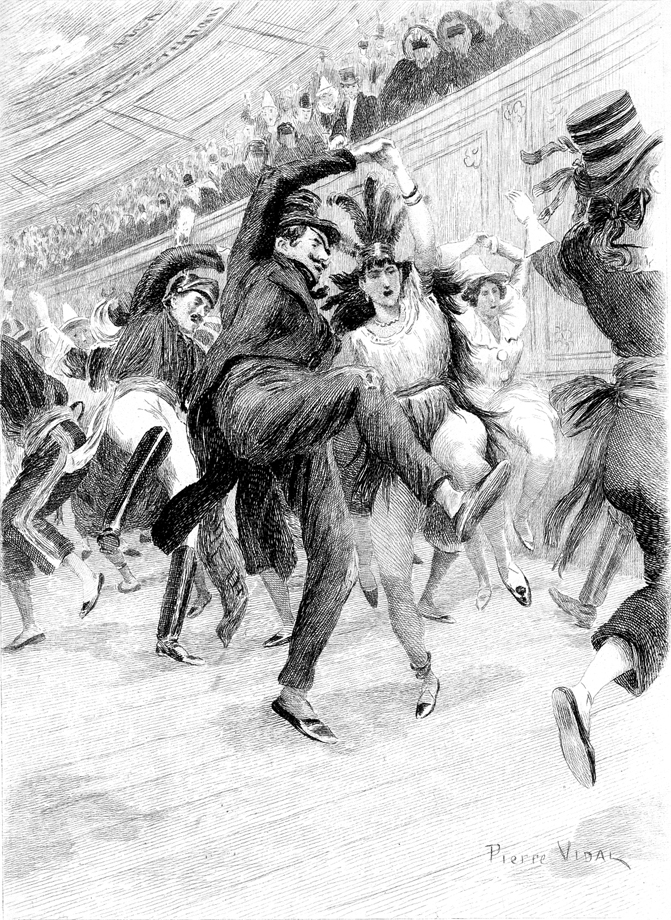
- Illustration from 1897 edition
- Author: Honoré de Balzac
- Language: French
- Series: La Comédie humaine
- Publication date: 1843
- Publication place: France
- Preceded by: Étude de femme
- Followed by: Une fille d'Eve

La Fausse Maîtresse (often titled Paz in English translation) is an 1843 novel by French novelist and playwright Honoré de Balzac (1799-1850) and included in his series of novels (or Roman-fleuve) known as La Comédie humaine (The Human Comedy) which parodies and depicts French society in the period of the Restoration and the July Monarchy (1815-1848). The plot is subtle and complex, and the true explanation is carefully hidden until the end of the book.

== Plot summary ==
Clementine is a descendant of rich and noble families whose wealth has been dissipated. She married Count Adam Laginski, a prosperous Polish immigrant of weak character. They are a happy couple well set up in an attractive house. Clementine discovers that Adam has a friend, Thaddee, who is acting as steward and general manager. He is a handsome young man from an impoverished noble family who has kept in the background. Adam and Thaddee had served together in the army and were close friends. Although Thaddee is poor, he is very capable. He is devoted to Adam, and volunteered to look after Adam’s affairs, worried that Adam would dissipate his fortune. Clementine insists that Thaddee join in their various social activities and finds him attractive. We learn that Thaddee has been secretly in love with Clementine since he first saw her at her wedding with Adam, and has preferred to worship her from afar while running the household. When Clementine notices signs of love-sickness in him, he invents a secret mistress, a girl in a circus called Malaga. Having done this, he has to make the story seem true, and tracks down Malaga, setting her up as his mistress. However he does no more apart from paying for her keep, not entering into romantic intimacy. Still, his being seen with her and paying her debts upsets Clementine. This leads to a violent scene where Clementine accuses him of having a base character. Thaddee, feeling that Clementine is now capable of looking after the household finances, claims that to get Malaga out of his mind he is leaving Paris and accepting a commission in the army from the Czar of Russia. After he leaves, another manservant in the household named Constantine gives separately secret letters from Thaddee to both Clementine and to Adam. Thaddee, out of a sense of honor, reveals to Clementine that his affair with Malaga was an invention to conceal his deep love for her. In the letter to Adam, we learn that Malaga had revealed to Thaddee that he has been having an affair with her and that he was aware of Adam's further losses at gambling. Thaddee advises Adam to conceal all this from Clementine because her noble soul could never forgive him his treachery. Nothing more is heard of him, until one night, when an infamous rake tries to seduce Clementine, taking her away in his carriage. A figure grabs Clementine and sets her on the right track in her own carriage. Clementine recognizes Thaddee, who has never left Paris but has kept in the background looking after his friends. The story ends with Clementine hoping one day to meet Thaddee again.

== Characters ==
- Count Adam Laginski
- Clementine
- Thaddee Paz
- Malaga (Marguerite Turquet)
