= Étude de femme =

Short story by Honoré de Balzac

- Author: Honoré de Balzac
- Language: French
- Series: La Comédie humaine
- Publication date: 1830
- Publication place: France
- Preceded by: Madame Firmiani
- Followed by: La Fausse Maîtresse

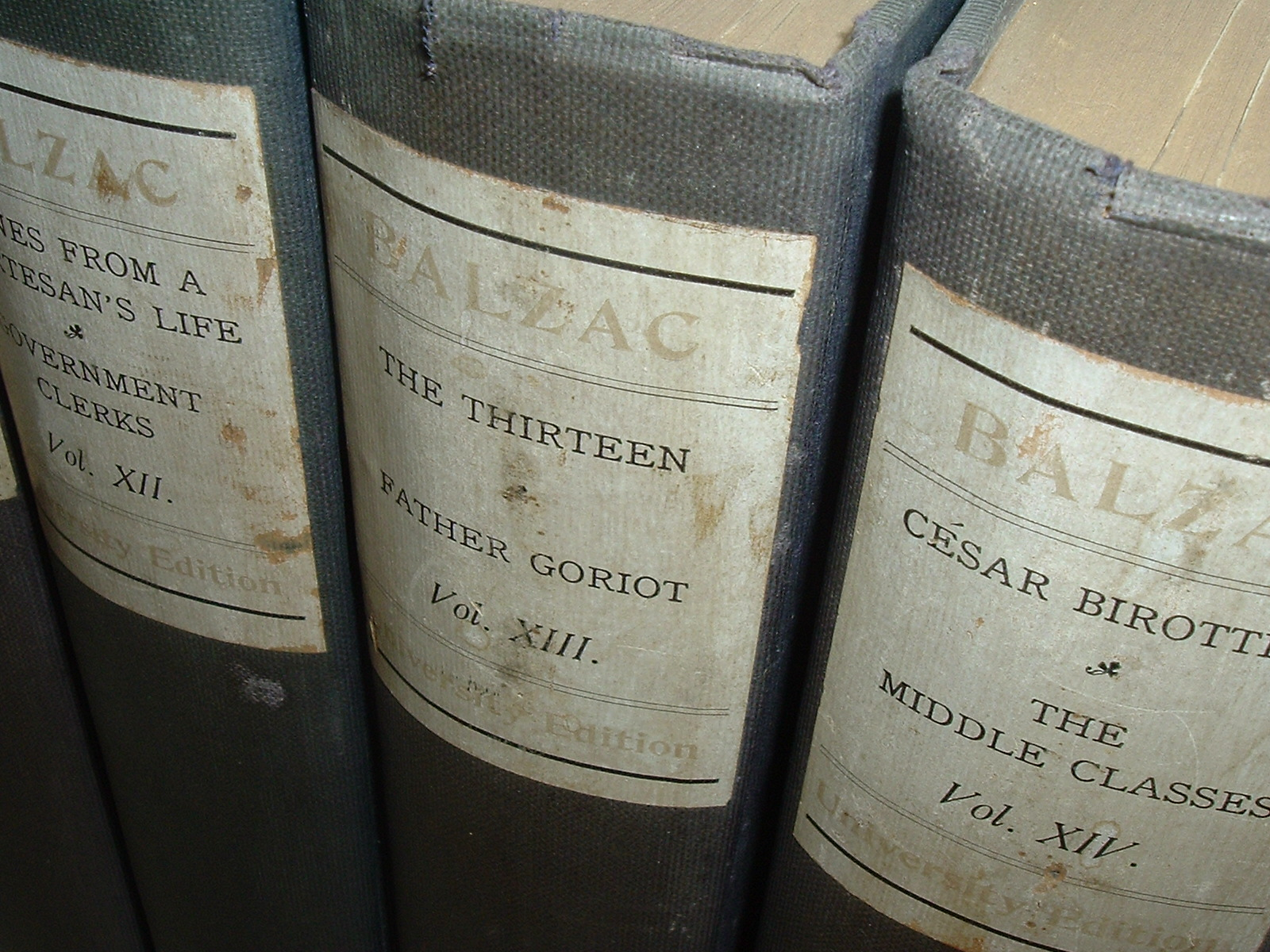

Étude de femme (English "Study of a Woman") is a short story by Honoré de Balzac. It was published in 1830 and is one of the Scènes de la vie privée of La Comédie humaine.

== Plot summary ==
The story is narrated in the first-person by Doctor Horace Bianchon. A young married society woman, Madame de Listomère briefly meets Eugène de Rastignac at a social gathering. The next day he writes a letter to his lover, Madame de Nucingen, but mistakenly addresses it to Madame de Listomère. When Madame de Listomère reads this letter she is scandalised. Rastignac only realises his mistake four days later, and it is confirmed to him by his friend, Horace Bianchon, who saw him writing the letter when he was visiting him.

Rastignac visits Madame de Listomère to try to clear the mistake. He is initially told that Madame is not home, but is let in by her husband when he arrives. Rastignac discovers that Madame de Listomère actually is at home and speaks to her. By this time, she has become convinced that he is genuinely attracted to her, but he tells her that the letter was actually for Madame de Nucingen. Rastignac leaves feeling embarrassed. For the next few days Madame de Listomère does not attend any social events, and Bianchon closes the story saying that he has been treating her for a slight attack of nerves, which she has been using as an excuse to stay home.

== Recurring characters ==
Rastignac and Bianchon appear in several novels and stories of La Comédie humaine, especially Le Père Goriot in which Rastignac is the main character.
