= L'Auberge rouge (short story) =

Short story by Honoré de Balzac

- Short story by Honoré de Balzac
- Country: France
- Language: French

Publication
- Publication date: 1831
- Series: La Comédie humaine

L'Auberge rouge (English "The Red Inn") is a short story by Honoré de Balzac. It was published in 1831 and is one of the Études philosophiques of La Comédie humaine.

== Background ==
The plot was inspired by a story told to Balzac by a former army surgeon, whose friend had been unjustly tried and executed.

== Plot summary ==
The story is told in the first person by an unnamed narrator. He attends a dinner party in Paris. A German guest named Hermann is asked to tell a story.

Hermann's story occurs in 1799 in Andernach on the Rhine in Germany. At that time it was occupied by France. Two young French doctors from Beauvais arrive in the town to serve with the French regiment stationed there. They arrange to spend the night at an inn called the Red Inn, because of its colour. A German businessman named Walhenfer also arrives there to spend the night. The inn is full, and the only place for the three new arrivals to spend the night is in the main dining room. Over dinner Walhenfer confesses to the two young doctors that he is carrying a bag full of gold and diamonds. Hermann remembers that the name of one of the French doctors is Prosper Magnan, but cannot remember the other's name.

During that night Magnan thinks about murdering Walhenfer, and running away with his valuables. He actually gets a knife out of his surgical bag to perform this. But he has second thoughts, and leaves the inn to go for a walk. After walking for some time, he returns to the inn and goes to bed. When he wakes up in the early morning, he finds that Walhenfer has been beheaded with his surgical knife. Magnan faints and falls into the pool of blood. When he wakes again he has been arrested by the French soldiers. Magnan's friend and Walhenfer's valuables are both missing, however because Magnan is covered in blood and his own knife was used, the soldiers suspect that Magnan is the murderer. Magnan was also seen walking outside, and is suspected of having buried Walhenfer's treasure.

Magnan is sent to the town's prison, and it is there that he meets Hermann, who is under arrest for trying to start a rebellion against the French. Magnan tells Hermann everything that has happened, and says that he is innocent. However at the court martial, he is found guilty, and is executed.

Whilst Hermann has been telling this story, the narrator notices that another guest, a wealthy man named Frederic Taillefer has been very agitated. The narrator suspects that Taillefer is the unnamed doctor in Hermann's story, especially when Hermann belatedly remembers that the other doctor was named Frederic. The narrator asks Taillefer if he is from Beauvais, and Taillefer confirms that he is. Taillefer then tries to avoid the narrator. The narrator has in the meantime fallen in love with a girl that he has seen at the party, and is shocked to discover that she is Taillefer's daughter Victorine.

After the party, the narrator continues to court Victorine, and occasionally also see her father. The narrator is then in a dilemma, and hosts a dinner party to which he invites 17 of his friends to ask them whether he should marry Victorine, even though he believes her father is a murderer. After explaining the problem they hold a secret ballot to determine whether he should marry her. They vote 9 to 8 against. However, the narrator is suspicious that the 9 against votes were from his younger friends who wish to marry Victorine themselves. The story concludes with one of the older guests telling the narrator that he was foolish to ask Taillefer whether he was from Beauvais.

== Recurring characters ==
The Taillefers also appear in the novel Père Goriot.

== Adaptation ==
The story was the basis for a French film version in 1923, directed by Jean Epstein. The films of the same name of 1951 and 2007 are based on unrelated events at Auberge rouge.
