= La Comédie humaine =

1829–1848 series of novels by Honoré de Balzac

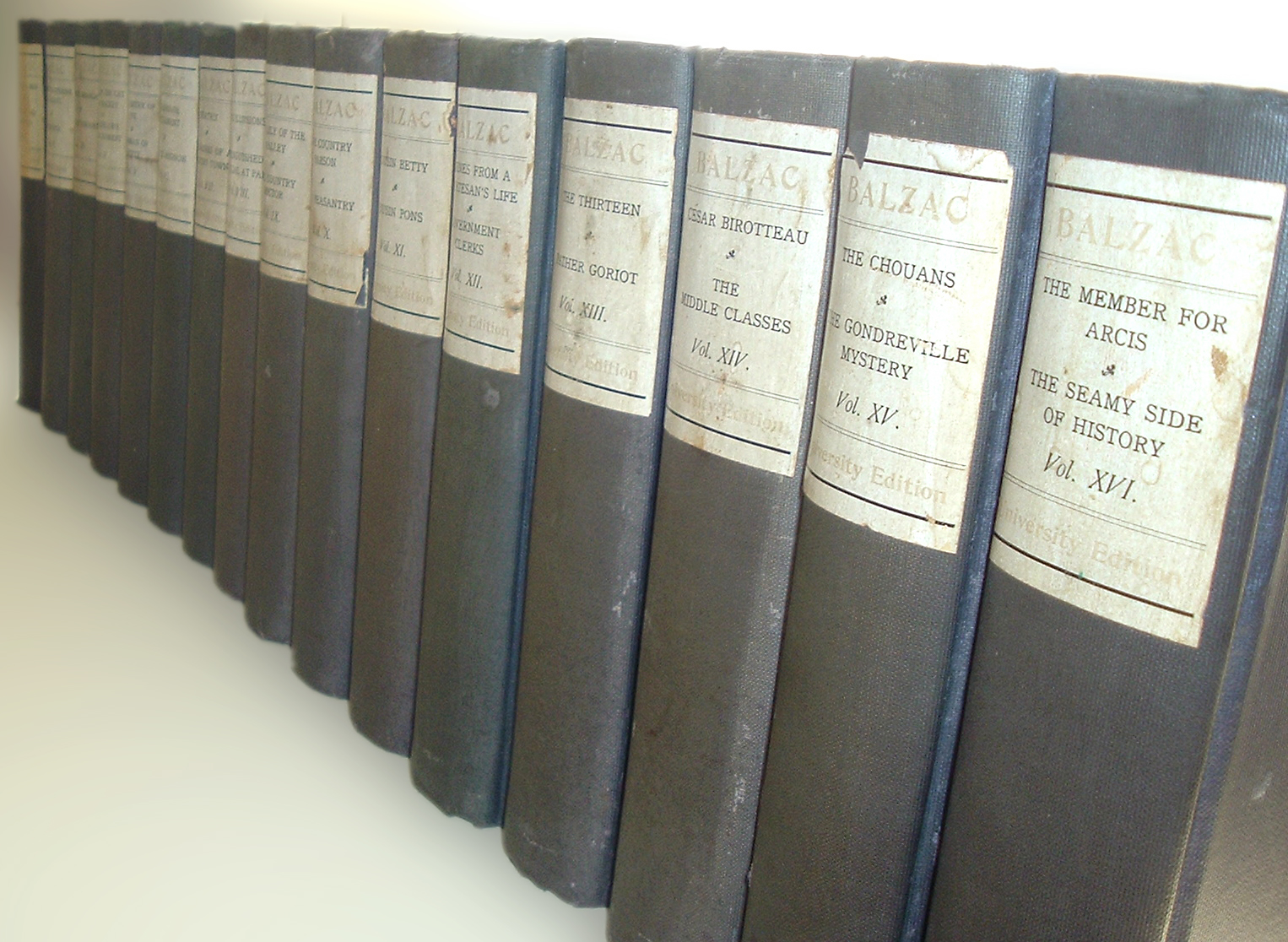
1901 edition of The Works of Honoré de Balzac, including the entire Comédie humaine

La Comédie humaine (French: [la kɔmedi ymɛn]; English: The Human Comedy) is Honoré de Balzac's 1829–48 multi-volume collection of interlinked novels and stories depicting French society in the period of the Restoration (1815–30) and the July Monarchy (1830–48).

La Comédie humaine consists of 91 finished works (stories, novels, or analytical essays) and 46 unfinished works (some of which exist only as titles). It does not include Balzac's five theatrical plays or his collection of humorous tales Les Cent Contes drolatiques (1832–37).

A pioneer of the modern novel, Balzac describes the totality of reality as he understood it, and shows aspects of life hitherto ignored in literature, because they were ugly or vulgar. He shows in its various forms the rise of capitalism and the omnipotence of money, leading to the disappearance of nobility and the dissolution of social ties. La Comédie Humaine refers to the medieval poem Divine Comedy. Balzac's world is grounded in sociology, not theology, where love and friendship are of prime importance and which highlights the complexity of people and the deep immorality of a social mechanism where the weak are crushed while the crooked banker and the venal politician triumph. A keen observer, Balzac created human types that are strikingly true. Some of his characters are so vivid that they have become archetypes, such as Rastignac, the ambitious young provincial, Grandet, the miserly domestic tyrant, or Father Goriot, the icon of fatherhood. He gives an important place to financiers and notaries, but also to the character of Vautrin, the outlaw with multiple identities. His work includes many courtesans and grisettes, as well as admirable and angelic women. The importance of these women and their psychology earned him an enthusiastic female readership very early on.

Despite the opposition of the Catholic Church, this work quickly became a printing phenomenon and greatly influenced the development of the novel both in France and elsewhere. Translated into many languages, it is still published today and has often been adapted for film and television.

== The title ==
The title of the series is usually considered an allusion to Dante's Divine Comedy; while Ferdinand Brunetière, the famous French literary critic, suggests that it may stem from poems by Alfred de Musset or Alfred de Vigny. While Balzac sought the comprehensive scope of Dante, his title indicates the worldly, human concerns of a realist novelist. The stories are placed in a variety of settings, with characters reappearing in multiple stories.

== Evolution of the work ==
The Comédie humaine was the result of a slow evolution. The first works of Balzac were written without any global plan (Les Chouans is a historical novel; Physiologie du mariage is an analytical study of marriage), but by 1830 Balzac began to group his first novels (Sarrasine, Gobseck) into a series entitled Scènes de la vie privée ("Scenes from Private Life").

In 1833, with the publication of Eugénie Grandet, Balzac envisioned a second series entitled "Scènes de la vie de province" (Scenes from Provincial Life). Most likely in this same year Balzac came upon the idea of having characters reappear from novel to novel, and the first novel to use this technique was Le Père Goriot (1834–35).

In a letter written to Madame Hanska in 1834, Balzac decided to reorganize his works into three larger groups, allowing him (1) to integrate his "La physiologie du mariage" into the ensemble and (2) to separate his most fantastic or metaphysical stories—like La Peau de chagrin (1831) and Louis Lambert (1832)—into their own "philosophical" section. The three sections were:

- "Études de Moeurs au XIXe siècle" (Studies of Manners in the 19th Century) – including the various "Scènes de la vie..."
- "Études philosophiques"
- "Études analytiques" – including the "Physiologie du mariage"

In this letter, Balzac went on to say that the "Études de Moeurs" would study the effects of society and touch on all genders, social classes, ages and professions of people. Meanwhile, the "Études philosophiques" would study the causes of these effects. Finally, the third "analytical" section would study the principles behind these phenomena. Balzac also explained that while the characters in the first section would be "individualités typisées" ("individuals made into types"), the characters of the "Études philosophiques" would be "types individualisés" (types made into individuals").

By 1836, the "Études de Moeurs" was already divided into six parts:

- "Scènes de la vie privée"
- "Scènes de la vie de province"
- "Scènes de la vie parisienne"
- "Scènes de la vie politique"
- "Scènes de la vie militaire"
- "Scènes de la vie de campagne"

In 1839, in a letter to his publisher, Balzac mentioned for the first time the expression Comédie humaine, and this title is in the contract he signed in 1841. The publication of the Comédie humaine in 1842 was preceded by an important preface or "avant-propos" describing his major principles and the work's overall structure (see below). For this edition, novels which had appeared in serial form were stricken of their chapter titles.

Balzac's intended collection was never finished. In 1845, Balzac wrote a complete catalogue of the ensemble which includes works he started or envisioned but never finished. In some cases, Balzac moved a work around between different sections as his overall plan developed; the catalogue given below represents that last version of that process.

Balzac's works were slow to be translated into English because they were perceived as unsuitable for Victorian readers. John Wilson Croker attacked it in the April 1836 issue of the Quarterly Review, excoriating Balzac for immorality, saying "a baser, meaner, filthier scoundrel never polluted society ...". The consensus of the day was that only Eugénie Grandet, Le Curé de Tours, Le Médecin de campagne and a few of the early short stories were suitable for females. Individual works appeared, but not until the 1890s did "complete" versions appear, from Ellen Marriage in London (1895–8, forty volumes edited by George Saintsbury, five omitted as too shocking) and from G. B. Ives and others in Philadelphia (1895–1900).

== The "Avant-propos" ==
In 1842, Balzac wrote a preface (an "Avant-propos") to the whole ensemble in which he explained his method and the collection's structure.

Motivated by the work of biologists Georges-Louis Leclerc, Comte de Buffon, Georges Cuvier and most importantly Étienne Geoffroy Saint-Hilaire, Balzac explains that he seeks to understand "social species" in the way a biologist would analyse "zoological species", and to accomplish this he intends to describe the interrelations of men, women and things. The importance of the woman is underlined by Balzac's contention that, while a biologist may gloss over the differences between a male and female lion, "in Society the woman is not simply the female of the man".

Balzac then gives an extensive list of writers and works that influenced him, including Sir Walter Scott, François Rabelais and Miguel de Cervantes.

He then describes his writer's role as a "secretary" who is transcribing society's "history"; moreover, he posits that he is interested in something that no previous historian has attempted: a history of "moeurs" (customs, manners and morals). He also notes his desire to go behind the surface of events, to show the reasons and causes for social phenomena. Balzac then professes his belief in two profound truths—religion and monarchy—and his concern for understanding the individual in the context of his family.

In the last half of his preface, Balzac explains the Comédie humaine's different parts (which he compares to "frames" and "galleries"), and which are more or less the final form of the collection (see below).

== Sources of the Comédie humaine ==
Because of its volume and complexity, the Comédie humaine touches on the major literary genres in fashion in the first half of the 19th century.

=== The historical novel ===
The historical novel was a European phenomenon in the first half of the 19th century—largely through the works of Sir Walter Scott, James Fenimore Cooper and, in France, Alexandre Dumas, père, and Victor Hugo. Balzac's first novel Les Chouans was inspired by this vogue and tells of the rural inhabitants of Brittany during the revolution with Cooper-like descriptions of their dress and manners.

Although the bulk of the Comédie humaine takes place during the Restoration and the July Monarchy, there are several novels which take place during the French Revolution and others which take place in the Middle Ages or the Renaissance, including "About Catherine de Medici" and "The Elixir of Long Life".

=== The popular novel ===
Balzac's later works are decidedly influenced by the genre of the serialised novel ("roman feuilleton") popular at the time, especially the works of Eugène Sue which concentrate on depicting the secret worlds of crime and vice that hide below the surface of French society, and by the ethos of melodrama typical of these part-works.

=== Fantasy ===
Many of Balzac's shorter works have elements taken from the popular "roman noir" or gothic novel, but often the fantastic elements are used for very different purposes in Balzac's work.

The magical ass's skin in La Peau de chagrin for example becomes a metaphor for diminished male potency and a key symbol of Balzac's conception of energy and will in the modern world.

In a similar way, Balzac undermines the character of Melmoth the Wanderer in his "Melmoth Reconciled": Balzac takes a character from a fantastic novel (by Charles Robert Maturin) who has sold his soul for power and long life and has him sell his own power to another man in Paris ... this man then sells this gift in turn and very quickly the infernal power is traded from person to person in the Parisian stock exchange until it loses any of its original power.

=== Swedenborg ===
Several of Balzac's characters, particularly Louis Lambert, traverse mystical crises and/or develop syncretic spiritual philosophies about human energy and action that are largely modelled on the life and work of Emanuel Swedenborg (1688–1772). As depicted in his works, Balzac's spiritual philosophy suggests that individuals have a limited quantity of spiritual energy and that this energy is dissipated through creative or intellectual work or through physical activity (including sex), and this is made emblematic in his philosophical tale La Peau de chagrin, in which a magical wild ass's skin confers on its owner unlimited powers, but shrinks each time it is used in science.

== Themes of the Comédie humaine ==
The following are some of the major themes that recur throughout the various volumes of the Comédie humaine:

=== France after the Revolution ===
Balzac frequently bemoans the loss of a pre-Revolutionary society of honor which has now become—especially after the fall of Charles X of France and the arrival of the July Monarchy—a society dominated by money.

=== Money and power ===
"At the origin of every fortune lies a crime": this precept from the "Red Inn" recurs constantly in the Comédie humaine, both as a biographical truth (Taillefer's murderous fortune, Goriot's deals with the Revolutionary army), and as a sign of French collective guilt at the horrors of the Revolution (and most notably by the execution of Louis XVI).

The other source of power is rank. People of good blood aspire to a title, while people with titles aspire to the peerage. The opening section of The Secrets of the Princess Cadignan provides an explanation of why the title of prince is not prevalent nor coveted in France (compared to contemporary Germany or Russia).

=== Social success ===
Two young men dominate the Comédie humaine: Lucien de Rubempré and Eugène de Rastignac. Both are talented but poor youths from the provinces, both attempt to achieve greatness in society through the intercession of women and both come into contact with Vautrin, but only Rastignac succeeds while Lucien de Rubempré ends his life by his own hand in a jail in Paris. The difference in outcome is partly explained by Balzac's views on heredity: Rastignac comes from a noble family, while only Rubempré's mother comes from a noble family (he had to obtain royal permission to use his mother's family name instead of his father's name Chardon). This deficit is compounded by the fact that his mother had not only married a commoner far beneath her in rank, but she had also performed menial labour to support herself when her husband died.

Another contrast is between Emile Blondet and Raoul Nathan. Both are multi-talented men-of-letters. Blondet is the natural son of the prefect of Alençon and is described as witty but lazy, incurably hesitant, non-partisan, a political atheist, a player of the game of political opinions (along with Rastignac), having the most judicious mind of the day. He marries Madame de Montcornet and eventually becomes a prefect. Nathan is described as half-Jewish and possessing a second-rate mind. Nathan succumbs to the flattery of unscrupulous financiers and does not see that they are prepared to bankrupt him to achieve their purposes. Blondet sees what is happening but does not enlighten Nathan. The downfall drives Nathan to attempt suicide by the method of "any poor work-girl". He then sells out to the government of the day (on Blondet's advice) to secure an income, and returns to living with the actress/courtesan Florine. In the end he accepts the cross of the Legion of Honour (which he formerly satirised) and becomes a defender of the doctrine of heredity.

=== Paternity ===
The Comédie humaine frequently portrays the complex emotional, social and financial relationships between fathers and their children, and between father-figures and their mentees, and these relationships are metaphorically linked as well with issues of nationhood (the king as father, regicide), nobility (bloodlines, family names), history (parental secrets), wealth (the origin of parental fortunes, dowries) and artistic creation (the writer or artist as father of the work of art). Father Goriot is perhaps the most famous—and most tragic—of these father figures, but in Le Père Goriot, Eugène de Rastignac also encounters two other paternal figures, Vautrin and Taillefer, whose aspirations and methods define different paternal paths. Other significant fathers in the series include Eugénie Grandet's abusive and money-hoarding father and César Birotteau, the doomed capitalist.

=== Maternity ===
At one end of the scale we have 100% maternal involvement – as depicted by the upbringing of the sisters de Granville (A Daughter of Eve) later Mesdames Felix de Vandenesse and du Tillet.

At the other end of the scale we have 0% maternal involvement – as depicted by the upbringing of Ursule Mirouët by four men: her half-uncle-in-law (an atheist and republican), the local priest (saintly), the district judge (learned) and a retired soldier (worldly).

We are left in no doubt that it is the second option that produces what Balzac considers to be the ideal woman. Ursula is pious and prone to collapsing in tears at the slightest emotion.

=== Women, society and sex ===
The representation of women in the Comédie humaine is extremely varied—spanning material from both the romantic and pulp traditions—and includes idealized women (like Pauline in La Peau de chagrin or Eugénie Grandet), the tragic prostitute Esther Gobsek (Splendeurs et misères des courtisanes), the worldly daughters of Goriot and other women in society who can help their lovers advance, the masculine and domineering Cousine Bette, and the alluring and impossible love object (Foedora in La Peau de chagrin or the heroine of La fille aux yeux d'or). The latter category also includes several lesbian or bisexual characters.

== Structure of La Comédie humaine ==
Balzac's final plan (1845) of the Comédie Humaine is as follows (projected works are not included; dates are those of initial publication, whether or not the work was initially conceived as part of the Comédie Humaine):

=== Studies of manners (Études de moeurs) ===
==== Scenes from private life (Scènes de la vie privée) ====
1. At the Sign of the Cat and Racket (La Maison du chat-qui-pelote, 1830)
2. The Ball at Sceaux (Le Bal de Sceaux, 1830)
3. Letters of Two Brides (Mémoires de deux jeunes mariées, 1842)
4. The Purse (La Bourse, 1832)
5. Modeste Mignon (1844)
6. A Start in Life (Un début dans la vie, 1845; first published as Le danger des mystifications, 1842)
7. Albert Savarus (1842)
8. The Vendetta (La Vendetta, 1830)
9. A Second Home (Une double famille, 1830)
10. Domestic Bliss (La Paix du ménage, 1830)
11. Madame Firmiani (1832)
12. Study of a Woman (Étude de femme, 1830)
13. The Imaginary Mistress (La fausse maîtresse, 1842, a.k.a. Paz)
14. A Daughter of Eve (Une fille d'Ève, 1838–39)
15. Le Colonel Chabert (1844, first published as La transaction, 1832)
16. The Message (Le message, 1832)
17. La Grenadière (1832)
18. The Deserted Woman (La Femme abandonnée, 1832)
19. Honorine (1843)
20. Béatrix (1839)
21. Gobseck (1830)
22. A Woman of Thirty (La Femme de trente ans, 1832)
23. Old Goriot (le Père Goriot, 1835)
24. Pierre Grassou (1840)
25. The Atheist's Mass (La messe de l'athée, 1836)
26. L'Interdiction (1836, a.k.a. The Commission in Lunacy)
27. A Marriage Contract (Le contrat de mariage, 1835)
28. Another Study of a Woman (Autre étude de femme, 1842)

==== Scenes from provincial life (Scènes de la vie de province) ====
1. The Lily of the Valley (Le lys dans la vallée, 1836)
2. Ursule Mirouët (1841)
3. Eugénie Grandet (1834)
4. The Celibates (Les Célibataires)
  1. Pierrette (1840)
  2. The Vicar of Tours (Le Curé de Tours, first published as Les célibataires, 1832)
  3. The Black Sheep (La Rabouilleuse, 1842, a.k.a. A Bachelor's Establishment, a.k.a. The Two Brothers)
5. Parisians in the Country (Les Parisiens en province)
  1. The Illustrious Gaudissart (L'Illustre Gaudissart, 1833)
  2. The Muse of the Department (La muse du département, 1843)
6. The Jealousies of a Country Town (Les Rivalités)
  1. The Old Maid (La Vieille Fille, 1836)
7. Provincials in Paris (Les Provinciaux à Paris)
  1. The Collection of Antiquities (Le Cabinet des Antiques, 1839)
8. Lost Illusions (Illusions perdues)
  1. The Two Poets (Les deux poètes, 1837)
  2. A Great Provincial in Paris (Un grand homme de province à Paris, 1839)
  3. The Sufferings of the Inventor (Les Souffrances de l’Inventeur, 1843, a.k.a. Ève et David)

==== Scenes from Parisian life (Scènes de la vie parisienne) ====
1. The Thirteen (Histoire des Treize)
  1. Ferragus (1833)
  2. The Duchess of Langeais (La Duchesse de Langeais, 1834)
  3. The Girl with the Golden Eyes (La fille aux yeux d'or, 1835)
2. The Government Clerks (Les Employés, 1838; first published as la Femme supérieure, 1837, a.k.a. Bureaucracy)
3. Sarrasine (1830)
4. César Birotteau (Histoire de la grandeur et de la décadence de César Birotteau, 1837)
5. The Firm of Nucingen (La Maison Nucingen, 1838)
6. Facino Cane (1836)
7. The Secrets of the Princess Cadignan (Les secrets de la Princesse de Cadignan, 1840, first published as Une Princesse parisienne, 1839)
8. Splendors and Miseries of Courtesans (Splendeurs et Misères des courtisanes, 1847, a.k.a. A Harlot High and Low), comprising
  1. Esther Happy (Esther heureuse, 1838)
  2. What Love Costs an Old Man (À combien l'amour revient aux vieillards, 1843)
  3. The End of Evil Ways (Où mènent les mauvais chemins, 1846)
  4. The Last Incarnation of Vautrin (La Dernière incarnation de Vautrin, 1847)
9. A Prince of Bohemia (Un prince de la Bohème, 1844; first published as les Fantaisies de Claudine, 1840)
10. The Unwitting Comedians (Les Comédiens sans le savoir, 1846)
11. Échantillon de causerie française (1832; revised and published under this title in 1844)
12. The Lesser Bourgeoisie (Les Petits Bourgeois, 1854, a.k.a. The Middle Classes)
13. The Seamy Side of History (Les Frères de la Consolation in Balzac's 1845 catalogue, later titled L'Envers de l'histoire contemporaine, 1848, a.k.a. The Wrong Side of Paris, a.k.a. The Brotherhood of Consolation)

==== Scenes from political life (Scènes de la vie politique) ====
1. An Episode Under the Terror (Un épisode sous la Terreur, 1830)
2. A Murky Business (Une ténébreuse affaire, 1841, a.k.a. A Historical Mystery, a.k.a. The Gondreville Mystery)
3. The Deputy for Arcis (Le Député d'Arcis; Balzac published l'Élection in 1847 before he died and requested Rabou finish the rest)
4. Z. Marcas (1840)

==== Scenes from military life (Scènes de la vie militaire) ====
1. The Chouans (Les Chouans, 1829)
2. The French in Egypt (Les Français en Égypte) (projected cycle)
  1. A Passion in the Desert (Une passion dans le désert, 1830)

==== Scenes from country life (Scènes de la vie de campagne) ====
1. The Peasants (Les Paysans, 1855; first part published in 1844, a.k.a. Sons of the Soil)
2. The Country Doctor (Le médecin de campagne, 1833)
3. The Village Rector (Le Curé de Village, 1839)

=== Philosophical studies (Études philosophiques) ===
1. The Wild Ass's Skin (La peau de chagrin, 1831)
2. Christ in Flanders (Jésus-Christ en Flandre, 1831)
3. Melmoth Reconciled (Melmoth réconcilié, 1835)
4. Massimilla Doni (1839)
5. The Unknown Masterpiece (Le Chef-d'oeuvre inconnu, 1831)
6. Gambara (1837)
7. The Quest of the Absolute (La recherche de l'absolu, 1834, a.k.a. Alkahest)
8. The Hated Son (L'enfant maudit, 1831)
9. Farewell (Adieu, 1830)
10. The Maranas (Les Marana, 1834, a.k.a. Juana)
11. The Conscript (Le Réquisitionnaire, 1831)
12. El Verdugo (1830)
13. A Drama on the Seashore (Un drame au bord de la mer, 1834)
14. Maître Cornélius (1831)
15. The Red Inn (L'Auberge rouge, 1831)
16. About Catherine de' Medici (Sur Catherine de Médicis, 1842; its three parts are listed separately as nos. 124–126 in Balzac's 1845 catalogue)
  1. The Calvinist Martyr (Le martyr calviniste)
  2. The Ruggieri's Secret (La confidence des Ruggieri)
  3. The Two Dreams (Les deux Rêves)
17. The Elixir of Life (L'élixir de longue vie, 1831)
18. The Exiles (Les Proscrits, 1831)
19. Louis Lambert (1832)
20. Séraphîta (1835)

=== Analytical studies (Études analytiques) ===
1. Physiology of Marriage (Physiologie du mariage, 1829)
2. Pathology of Social Life (Pathologie de la vie sociale, 1839), a collection of nonfiction essays
  1. Treatise on Elegant Living (Traité de la vie élégante, 1830)
  2. Theory of Walking Habits (Théorie de la démarche, 1833)
  3. Treatise on Contemporary Stimulants (Traité des excitants modernes, 1839)

== Posthumous "definitive" structural revision by Rabou ==
In French, the series is more often published according to the plan of the posthumous "Definitive Edition" that was prepared by Charles Rabou, Balzac's chosen literary executor whom he even entrusted to complete some of his unfinished works in the series:

=== Studies of manners (Études de moeurs) ===
==== Scenes from private life (Scènes de la vie privée) ====
1. At the Sign of the Cat and Racket (La Maison du chat-qui-pelote, 1830)
2. The Ball at Sceaux (Le Bal de Sceaux, 1830)
3. Letters of Two Brides (Mémoires de deux jeunes mariées, 1842)
4. The Purse (La bourse, 1832)
5. Modeste Mignon (1844)
6. A Start in Life (Un début dans la vie, 1845; first published as Le danger des mystifications, 1842)
7. Albert Savarus (1842)
8. The Vendetta (La Vendetta, 1830)
9. A Second Home (Une double famille, 1830)
10. Domestic Bliss (La paix du ménage, 1830)
11. Madame Firmiani (1832)
12. Study of a Woman (Étude de femme, 1830)
13. The Imaginary Mistress (La fausse maîtresse, 1842, a.k.a. Paz)
14. A Daughter of Eve (Une fille d'Ève, 1838–39)
15. The Message (Le message, 1832)
16. La Grande Bretèche (1832; often included in Another Study of a Woman (1842))
17. La Grenadière (1832)
18. The Deserted Woman (La Femme abandonnée, 1832)
19. Honorine (1843)
20. Béatrix (1839)
21. Gobseck (1830)
22. A Woman of Thirty (La Femme de trente ans, 1832)
23. Old Goriot (le Père Goriot, 1835)
24. Le Colonel Chabert (1844, first published as La transaction, 1832)
25. The Atheist's Mass (La Messe de l'athée, 1836)
26. L'Interdiction (1836, a.k.a. The Commission in Lunacy)
27. A Marriage Contract (Le Contrat de mariage, 1835)
28. Another Study of a Woman (Autre étude de femme, 1842; often includes La Grande Bretèche (1832))

==== Scenes from provincial life (Scènes de la vie de province) ====
1. Ursule Mirouët (1841)
2. Eugénie Grandet (1834)
3. From The Celibates (Les célibataires)
  1. Pierrette (1840)
  2. The Vicar of Tours (Le Curé de Tours, first published as Les célibataires, 1832)
  3. The Black Sheep (La Rabouilleuse, 1842, a.k.a. A Bachelor's Establishment, a.k.a. The Two Brothers)
4. From Parisians in the Country (Les Parisiens en province)
  1. The Illustrious Gaudissart (L'illustre Gaudissart, 1833)
  2. The Muse of the Department (La muse du département, 1843)
5. From The Jealousies of a Country Town (Les Rivalités)
  1. The Old Maid (La vieille fille, 1836)
  2. The Collection of Antiquities (Le Cabinet des Antiques, 1839)
6. From Lost Illusions (Illusions perdues)
  1. The Two Poets (Les deux poètes, 1837)
  2. A Great Provincial in Paris (Un grand homme de province à Paris, 1839)
  3. Eve and David (Ève et David, 1843)

==== Scenes from Parisian life (Scènes de la vie parisienne) ====
1. The 13 (Histoire des Treize)
  1. Ferragus (1833)
  2. The Duchess of Langeais (La Duchesse de Langeais, 1834)
  3. The Girl with the Golden Eyes (La fille aux yeux d'or, 1835)
2. César Birotteau (Histoire de la grandeur et de la décadence de César Birotteau, 1837)
3. The Firm of Nucingen (La Maison Nucingen, 1838)
4. Splendors and Miseries of Courtesans (Splendeurs et Misères des courtisanes, 1847, a.k.a. A Harlot High and Low), comprising
  1. Esther Happy (Esther heureuse, 1838)
  2. What Love Costs an Old Man (À combien l'amour revient aux vieillards, 1843)
  3. The End of Evil Ways (Où mènent les mauvais chemins, 1846)
  4. The Last Incarnation of Vautrin (La Dernière incarnation de Vautrin, 1847)
5. The Secrets of the Princess Cadignan (Les Secrets de la Princesse de Cadignan, 1840, first published as Une Princesse parisienne, 1839)
6. Facino Cane (1836)
7. Sarrasine (1830)
8. Pierre Grassou (1840)
9. Poor Relations (Les parents pauvres)
  1. Cousin Bette (La cousine Bette, 1846)
  2. Cousin Pons (Le cousin Pons, 1847)
10. A Man of Business (Un homme d'affaires, 1846; first published as Les roueries d'un créancier, 1845)
11. A Prince of Bohemia (Un prince de la Bohème, 1844; first published as Les fantaisies de Claudine, 1840)
12. Gaudissart II (1846; first published as un Gaudissart de la rue Richelieu; les Comédies qu'on peut voir gratis, 1844)
13. The Government Clerks (Les Employés, 1838; first published as La femme supérieure, 1837, a.k.a. Bureaucracy)
14. The Unwitting Comedians (Les Comédiens sans le savoir, 1846)
15. The Lesser Bourgeoisie (Les Petits Bourgeois, 1854, a.k.a. The Middle Classes)
16. The Seamy Side of History (L'envers de l'histoire contemporaine, 1848, a.k.a. The Wrong Side of Paris, a.k.a. The Brotherhood of Consolation)

==== Scenes from political life (Scènes de la vie politique) ====
1. An Episode Under the Terror (Un épisode sous la Terreur, 1830)
2. A Murky Business (Une ténébreuse affaire, 1841, a.k.a. A Historical Mystery, a.k.a. The Gondreville Mystery)
3. The Deputy for Arcis (Balzac published l'Électionin 1847 before he died and requested Rabou finish the rest)
4. Z. Marcas (1840)

==== Scenes from military life (Scènes de la vie militaire) ====
1. The Chouans (Les Chouans, 1829)
2. A Passion in the Desert (Une passion dans le désert, 1830)

==== Scenes from country life (Scènes de la vie de campagne) ====
1. The Peasants (Les Paysans, 1855; first part published in 1844, a.k.a. Sons of the Soil)
2. The Country Doctor (Le médecin de campagne, 1833)
3. The Village Rector (Le curé de village, 1839)
4. The Lily of the Valley (Le lys dans la vallée, 1836)

=== Philosophical studies (Études philosophiques) ===
1. The Wild Ass's Skin (La peau de chagrin, 1831)
2. Christ in Flanders (Jésus-Christ en Flandre, 1831)
3. Melmoth Reconciled (Melmoth réconcilié, 1835)
4. The Unknown Masterpiece (Le Chef-d'oeuvre inconnu, 1831)
5. Gambara (1837)
6. Massimilla Doni (1839)
7. The Quest of the Absolute (La recherche de l'absolu, 1834, a.k.a. Alkahest)
8. The Hated Son (L'enfant maudit, 1831)
9. Farewell (Adieu, 1830)
10. The Maranas (Les Marana, 1834, a.k.a. Juana)
11. The Conscript (Le Réquisitionnaire, 1831)
12. El Verdugo (1830)
13. A Drama on the Seashore (Un drame au bord de la mer, 1834)
14. Maître Cornélius (1831)
15. The Red Inn (L'Auberge rouge, 1831)
16. About Catherine de' Medici (Sur Catherine de Médicis, 1842)
  1. The Calvinist Martyr (Le martyr calviniste)
  2. The Ruggieri's Secret (La confidence des Ruggieri)
  3. The Two Dreams (Les Deux Reves)
17. The Elixir of Life (L'élixir de longue vie, 1831)
18. The Exiles (Les proscrits, 1831)
19. Louis Lambert (1832)
20. Séraphîta (1835)

=== Analytical studies (Études analytiques) ===
1. Physiology of Marriage (Physiologie du mariage, 1829)
2. Little Miseries of Conjugal Life (Petites misères de la vie conjugale, 1846)
3. Pathology of Social Life (Pathologie de la vie sociale, 1839), a collection of nonfiction essays
  1. Treatise on Elegant Living (Traité de la vie élégante, 1830)
  2. Theory of Walking Habits (Théorie de la démarche, 1833)
  3. Treatise on Contemporary Stimulants (Traité des excitants modernes, 1839)

Rabou's "definitive" revisions and additions were generally panned by literary critics, and that has left Balzac's final ordering more common in English translation than Rabou's.

== Characters ==
=== Recurring characters ===
- Eugène de Rastignac – student, dandy, financier, politician (appears in 28 works)
- Lucien Chardon de Rubempré (the use of "de Rubempré" is contested) – journalist, parvenu
- Jacques Collin a.k.a. Abbé Carlos Herrera a.k.a. Vautrin a.k.a. Trompe-la-Mort – a criminal run away from forced labour
- Camusot – examining magistrate (The Collection of Antiquities, A Commission in Lunacy, Scenes from a Courtesan's Life; his father also appears in A Distinguished Provincial at Paris)
- Blondet, Emile – journalist, man of letters, prefect (The Collection of Antiquities, A Distinguished Provincial at Paris, Scenes from a Courtesan's Life). Compare and contrast with Raoul Nathan.
- Raoul Nathan – in 19 works, writer, politician
- Daniel d'Arthez
- Delphine de Nucingen née Goriot
- Roger de Granville
- Louis Lambert
- la duchesse de Langeais
- la comtesse de Mortsauf
- Jean-Jacques Bixiou – in 19 works, artist
- Joseph Bridau – in 13 works, painter
- Marquis de Ronquerolles – in 20 works
- la comtesse Hugret de Sérisy – in 20 works
- Félix-Amédée de Vandenesse
- Horace Bianchon – in 24 works, doctor
- des Lupeaulx – public servant
- Salon leaders: the Duchesse de Maufrigneuse, the Marquise d'Espard
- Dandies: Maxime de Trailles, Henri de Marsay
- Courtesans: La Torpille (Esther van Gobseck), Madame du Val-Noble
- Financiers: Ferdinand du Tillet, Frédérick de Nucingen, Keller brothers
- Actresses: Florine (Sophie Grignault), Coralie
- Publishers/Journalists/Critics: Finot, Etienne Lousteau, Felicien Vernou
- Money lenders: Jean-Esther van Gobseck, Bidault a.k.a. Gigonnet

Characters who appear in several titles but only significantly in one of them

- Birotteau
- Goriot
- Claude Vignon
- Mademoiselle des Touches (aka Camille Maupin)

=== Characters in a single volume ===
- Raphaël de Valentin
- le baron Hulot
- Balthazar Claës
- Grandet
- le cousin Pons
