= L'illustre Gaudissart =

Short story by Honoré de Balzac

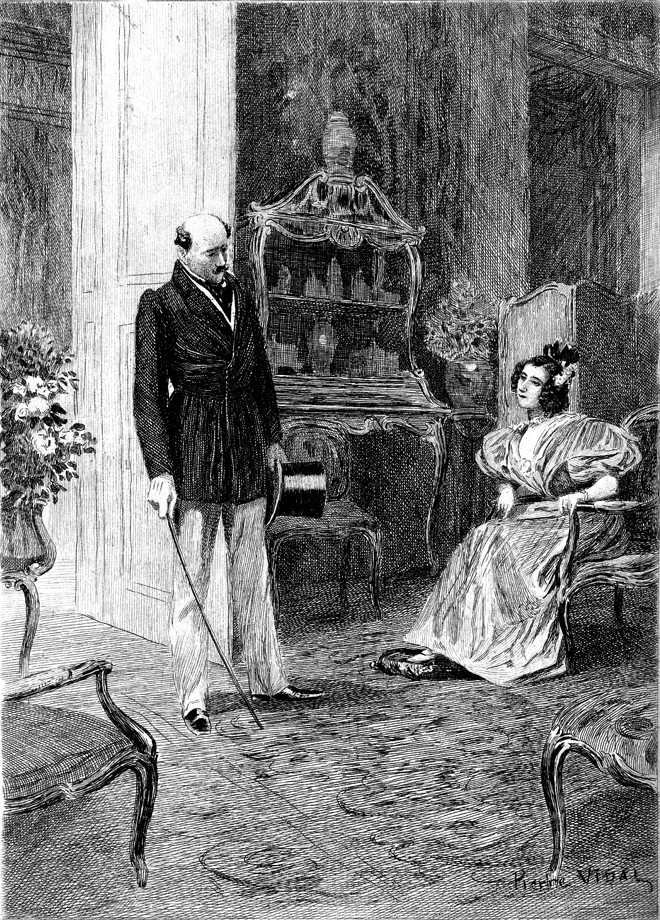
- Illustration by Pierre Vidal
- Author: Honoré de Balzac
- Language: French
- Series: La Comédie humaine
- Publication date: 1833
- Publication place: France

L'illustre Gaudissart (English "The Illustrious Gaudissart") is a short story by Honoré de Balzac. It was published in 1833 and is one of the Scènes de la vie de province of La Comédie humaine.

== Plot summary ==
Felix Gaudissart is a successful and ambitious travelling salesman, based in Paris. He is nicknamed "The Illustrious Gaudissart". He has previously sold clothing and hats, but at the start of the story he has also taken up selling life insurance and subscriptions to newspapers. The latter include newspapers advocating Saint-Simonianism and republicanism, and he learns the Saint-Simonian doctrine without having any belief in it.

He sets off to the Touraine area on a sales trip, and during this trip stays in the town of Vouvray. He tries to sell his items to a local man named Vernier, without realising that Vernier is strongly opposed to Saint-Simonianism. As a practical joke, Vernier recommends that he sells his items to his insane neighbour Margaritis. After a long discussion with Margaritis filled with comic misunderstandings, Gaudissart sells some children's newspaper subscriptions to him, and also agrees to buy two barrels of wine from Margaritis. Vernier eavesdrops on this conversation and brags about it to his friends.

When he gets back to his hotel, the landlord tells Gaudissart that he has been fooled, and that the wine barrels he bought from Margaritis do not exist. Gaudissart is angry about this, and then confronts Vernier and challenges him to a duel. The next morning Gaudissart and Vernier meet for their duel and both deliberately miss their shots. They then reconcile, and a relieved Vernier agrees to buy some children's newspaper subscriptions from him. Gaudissart then threatens to take legal action over the nonexistent barrels of wine that Margaritis owes him, so Madame Margaritis agrees to pay him compensation for these instead.
