= Le Médecin de campagne =

1833 novel by Honoré de Balzac

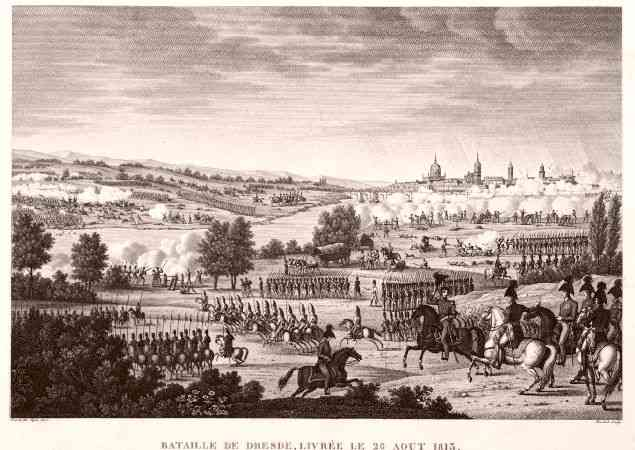
- The Battle of Dresden, one of the tales told by Goguelat
- Author: Honoré de Balzac
- Language: French
- Series: La Comédie humaine
- Publication date: 1833
- Publication place: France

Le Médecin de campagne (The Country Doctor) is an 1833 novel by Honoré de Balzac. The second in his Scène de la vie de campagne series, it addresses the author's preoccupations with social organisation, political power and religion, though Balzac's own political principles were not those of the character Dr Benassis. None of the characters appear elsewhere in La Comédie humaine.

The heart of the third part of the book is made up of tales told during a vigil in a barn by Goguelat, a former soldier in the armies of Napoleon. This section uses material that Balzac had gathered for a planned work, Les Batailles napoléoniennes, which he began but never finished.

== Synopsis ==
In 1829 Commander Genestas arrives in a village in the Dauphiné, where he meets Dr Benassis, who has transformed the miserable settlement into a small but prosperous town in only ten years. Each of the two men has a secret, which is revealed only at the end of the book.

== Themes ==
In this Scene from Country Life, Balzac touches on several themes. In a minor key, it evokes the unhappy love affairs of its two main characters, Doctor Benassis and Genestas. But, for them, these disappointments in love had the effect of developing their sense of devotion, one to the development of an entire community, the other to the care of the child that a woman he loved had another man. The theme of a child's suffering comes up several times, like an intolerable reality: “Hey! well, if it is impossible for me to see a child without thinking of the angel I have lost, judge of my pains in laying down a child condemned to die? I don't know how to see a child coldly".
