= Eugène de Rastignac =

Honoré de Balzac character

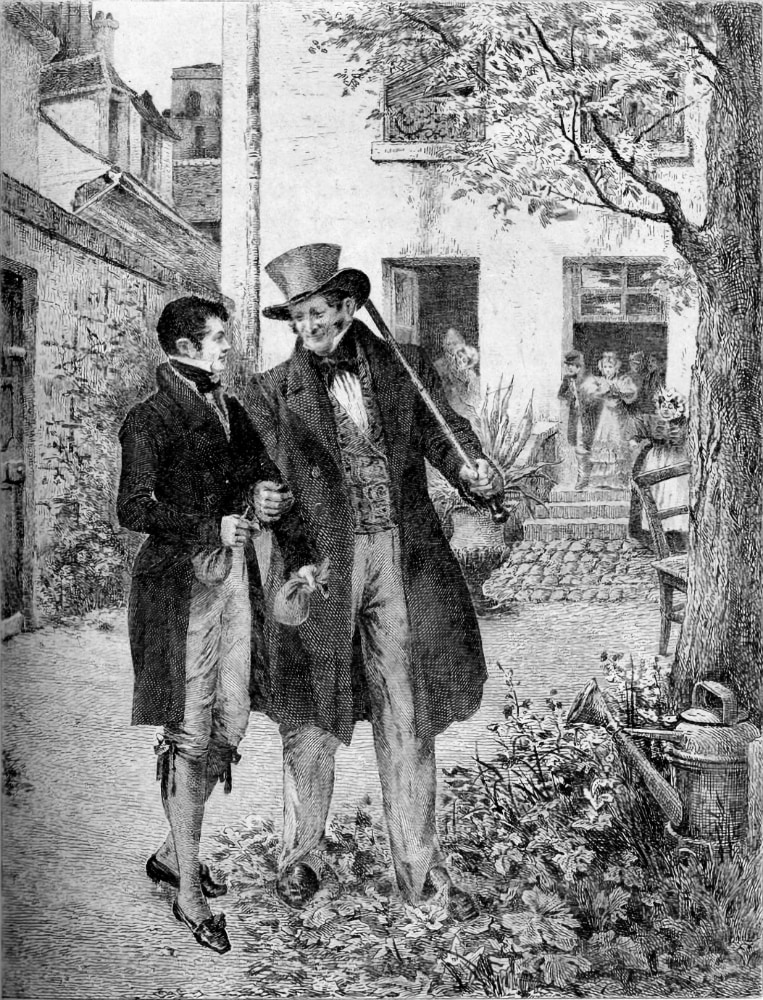
Rastignac (left) with Vautrin, illustration from Le Père Goriot.

Eugène de Rastignac (French pronunciation: [øʒɛn də ʁastiɲak]) is a fictional character from La Comédie humaine, a series of novels by Honoré de Balzac. He appears as a main character in Le Père Goriot (1835), and his social advancement in the post-revolutionary French world depicted by Balzac can be followed through Rastignac's various appearances in other books of the series.

Rastignac is initially portrayed as an ambitious young man of noble, albeit poor, extraction who is at times both envious of and naive about high society. Although he is ready to do anything to achieve his goals, he spurns the advice of Vautrin (the series' dark criminal mastermind) and instead uses his own wits and charm (especially through relationships with women, such as his cousin Madame de Beauséant) to arrive at his ends. His eventual social success in the fictional world of the Comédie humaine is frequently contrasted with the tragic failure of another young parvenu in the series: Lucien de Rubempré (who accepts the aid of Vautrin and ends his life by his own hands).

In French today, to refer to someone as a Rastignac is to call him or her an ambitious arriviste or social climber.

== Rastignac in La Comédie Humaine ==
The following list is organized with, first, the date on which Rastignac features, the title of the book in which Rastignac appears, followed by the date the book was written.

=== Books which feature Rastignac as a main character, or which reveal something significant about his progress ===
1819 – Le Père Goriot (1835) – Rastignac is a 21-year-old student in Paris. He makes his first forays into high society (drawing on his family's resources to the full), is tempted by but rejects the machinations of Vautrin, and is confronted by cynicism and falseness in the people he meets. Initially desiring the Comtesse Anastasie de Restaud (daughter of Father Goriot), he is persuaded to become the lover of her sister Delphine (wife of the Baron de Nucingen, a wealthy Alsatian) by his cousin the Vicomtesse de Beauseant, who has a greater insight into Parisian life and acts as his patron. Goriot approves of Rastignac as Delphine's lover and sues Nucingen to give her control over her dowry. Delphine then sets up Rastignac in a furnished establishment. At Goriot's death, Rastignac is among the few who attend his funeral, and from the heights of Père Lachaise Cemetery he looks down on the French capital and makes his famous proclamation "À nous deux, maintenant!" ("It's between you and me now!")

1828 – L'Interdiction (1836) – In some unexplained manner Rastignac now has an annual income of 20,000 francs. This is less than it could have been as he was "thoroughly done ... in that Nucingen business". He has not forgotten the sacrifices of his family and has arranged marriages for his sisters, presumably by supplying adequate dowries. Rastignac is thinking of leaving Delphine for the Marquise d'Espard, who has the sort of power that will help him to advance.

1833 – Les Secrets de la princesse de Cadignan(1840) – Rastignac is Under-Secretary of State to Prime Minister de Marsay. His cleverness is illustrated in the way he wins over Daniel d'Arthez by allowing funeral honours for Michel Chrestien. His relationship with Delphine is given as an example during a discussion on long-standing attachments. It appears that Rastignac had an affair with the Duchesse de Maufrigneuse at some earlier stage.

1834 – Une ténébreuse affaire (1841) – Rastignac appears as one of the people to whom a denouement is made, 30 years after the narrated events occurred. He is still Under-Secretary of State in the ministry of de Marsay, who is now close to death.

1834–1835 – Une Fille d'Eve (1835) – Rastignac is hoping to succeed the dying de Marsay as prime minister. De Marsay's party does not stay in power after his death, and Rastignac is forced to rely on Raoul Nathan, despite Nathan's being a political opponent. When Nathan emerges as an electoral rival to du Tillet, Rastignac changes sides and does not warn Nathan of du Tillet's plans to bankrupt him (via Gigonnet). Rastignac is easily persuaded to reveal the plot when the Comte de Vandenesse promises to support Rastignac's claim to the peerage. On the personal side, Rastignac's younger brother (previously unmentioned) has been made a bishop at 27, and one of his sisters is married to Martial de la Roche-Hugon, a government minister. Rastignac and Delphine appear to have plans for his marriage to her daughter.

1833 and 1836 – La Maison Nucingen (1838), frame story – During a conversation between four journalists, the reader learns that in 1833 Rastignac broke his relationship with Delphine de Nucingen, but that he is still working with her husband, especially in his more fraudulent financial deals (Rastignac has earned 400,000 francs and has 40,000 francs of annual interest revenues). In 1836, he is on his way to becoming a governmental minister and becoming a peer of France.

1839 – Le Député d'Arcis (1847, unfinished) – Rastignac is minister for the second time (of Public Works), he has been made Comte (ranking as a peer of France), his brother-in-law Roche-Hugon is now an ambassador and Councillor of State (equivalent to senator), and he is regarded as indispensable to the government. "After 20 at hard labour" Rastignac has recently married the daughter of Delphine and Baron de Nucingen (their only child, and thus the inheritor of their vast fortune).

Rastignac is admired for his ability to convert political opponents. He is also the numbers man for his party: although expecting defeat in the coming general elections, he schemes to secure the rotten borough of Arcis to strengthen his party when in opposition. Rastignac's scheme fails and, despite unexpectedly remaining in power, he resorts to underhanded methods to discredit the new member for Arcis, Charles de Sallenauve (née Marie-Gaston). This includes pressuring de l'Estorade to connive in falsehoods, despite owing the life of his daughter to Sallenauve.

A contrast is made between the fortunes of Rastignac and de Trailles, which are now the complete opposite of what they were when they first met in Pere Goriot.

The following problem may be due to the book having been finished by another person:

Given the chronology set out above, it is not clear when Rastignac could have been a minister for the first time. It is possible that the finisher has mistakenly counted Rastignac's previous position as Under-Secretary of State as his first ministry. Comments made by Raoul Nathan in Une Fille d'Eve make it clear that this is not the case.

1845 – Les Comédiens sans le Savoir (1845) – Rastignac is 48. The caricaturist Bixiou says of him: "he has 300,000 francs of annual interest revenues, is a Peer of France, the king has made him Comte, he is the son-in-law of Nucingen, and he's one of the two or three men of State who were brought into being by the July Revolution... but power burdens him sometimes..."

=== Other books in which Rastignac appears or is mentioned ===
1820 – Le Bal de Sceaux (1829) – Rastignac does not appear personally, but is suggested as a possible husband. In rejecting him, Emilie says meaningfully "Madame de Nucingen has made a banker of him".

1821–1822 – Les Illusions Perdues (1836–1843) – Rastignac appears as one of the dandies that Lucien aspires to emulate. As a clever and skillful social climber, Rastignac knows both how to use people and how to eliminate his competition.

1822–1824 – Le Cabinet des Antiques (1837) – Rastignac appears as one of the dandies that Victurnien d'Esgrignon falls in with during his sojourn in Paris.

1823 – Étude de femme (1835) – A short anecdote narrated by Bianchon. Rastignac is described as "one of those extremely clever young men who try all things, and seem to sound others to discover what the future has in store". The anecdote describes a series of errors committed by Rastignac and attributes them to his inexperience. The woman in question is the Marquise de Listomere, née Vandenesse.

The date is problematic: Rastignac is 25; however the Morea expedition (commenced 1828) is discussed.

18?? – Autre Etude de Femme (1842) –

1824–1830 – Splendeurs et misères des courtisanes (1838–1847) – Rastignac appears numerous times throughout the book, most prominently at the start (on Lucien's return to Paris) and at the end (at Lucien's funeral).

18?? – Un Ménage de Garçon also titled La Rabouilleuse (1842) –

1829 – Ursule Mirouet (1842) – Rastignac appears as one of the dandies whom Savinien de Portenduere falls in with during his sojourn in Paris.

1829–1831 – La Peau de Chagrin (1831) – Rastignac appears indirectly when Raphael de Valentin narrates his life to Emile Blondet. Rastignac's friendship and support for Raphael is vastly different from his treatment of Lucien. Although both are talented and poor, Raphael is a Marquis and cousin to the Duc de Navarrein. Rastignac was planning to marry a rich widow, but changes his mind when he finds that her income was only 18,000 francs and she had an extra toe.

1838–1846 – La Cousine Bette (1847) – Rastignac does not appear personally, but is so influential that he is among the first people considered when the Hulot family seek to have Wenceslas Steinbock's artistic talents recognised.
