= Alexandre Auffredi =

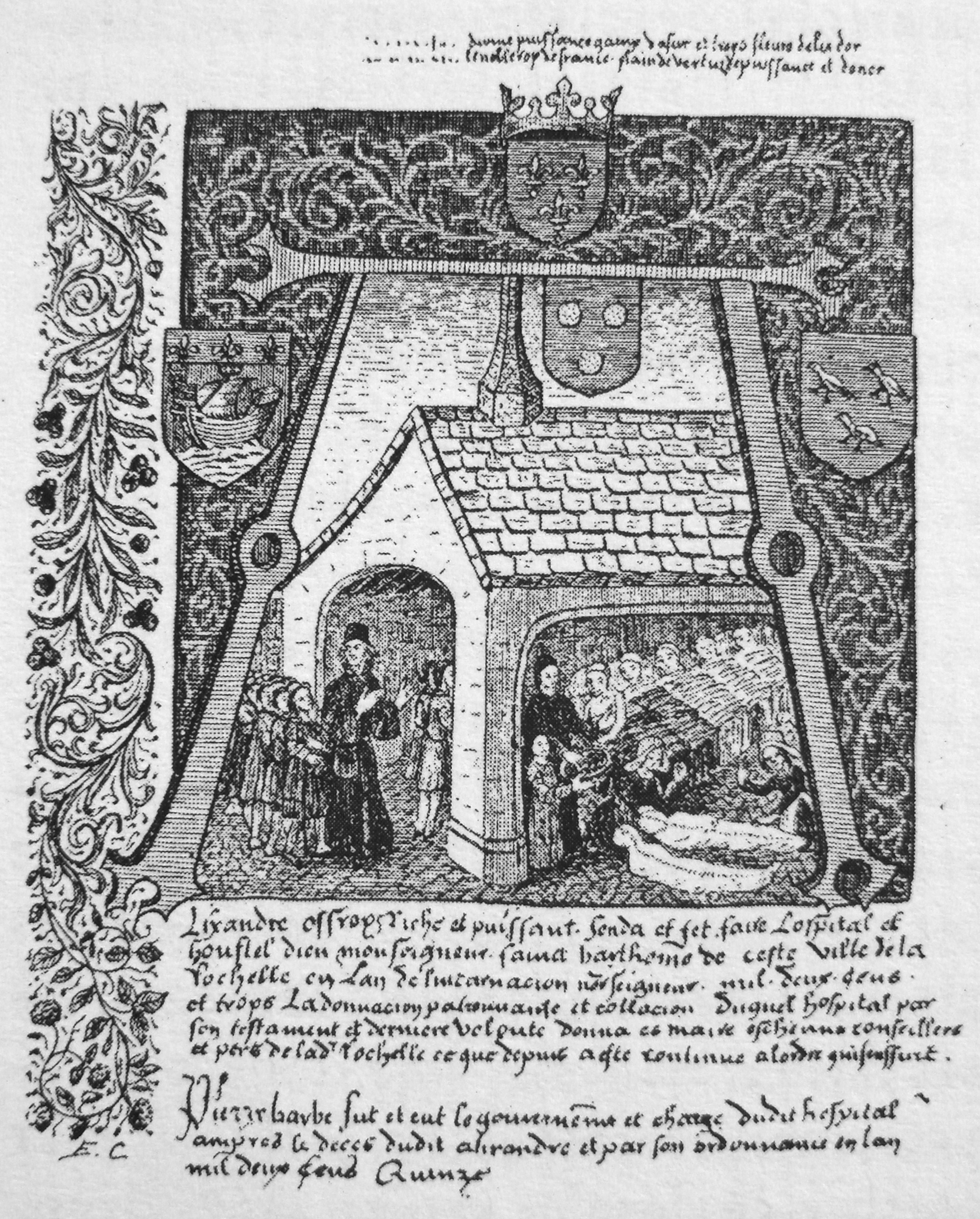
Front page of the accounting book ("Cartulaire") of Auffredi, showing him taking care of sick people in his hospital, 13th century.

Alexandre Auffredi (late 12th century - c. 1220) was a wealthy bourgeois of La Rochelle in France, who in 1196 sent a fleet of ships to Africa to tap the riches of the continent. He went bankrupt and into poverty as he waited for the return of his ships, finally returned seven years later filled with riches. As a result of the adventure, Auffredi became extremely rich. He devoted the rest of his life to help the poor, and founded the Saint Barthelemy Hospital. A central area of La Rochelle was named after him.

== Life ==
Auffredi's year of birth is unknown, but he lived between the end of the 12th century and the beginning of the 13th century. This was at a time when La Rochelle was developing as an important port along the Bay of Biscay in France. Himself a ship owner, Auffredi owned a commercial fleet of boats. In 1196, he sent his entire fleet on a voyage to the coast of Africa with the goal of bringing back valuable goods. Some sources state his fleet numbered 7 ships but according to the 18th century French historian Louis-Étienne Arcère, Auffredi sent out 10-ships on a voyage from La Rochelle. The ships were loaded with salt and wine - important goods produced by La Rochelle - to trade for goods in Africa.

The voyage lasted longer than the three or four months he had expected. Left with a small fortune and having exhausted all his resources, Auffredi accumulated debts with little income. He was forced to repay his debts to the Templars in La Rochelle who helped finance the voyage. To make money, Auffredi was forced to sell his processions including his mansion. Eventually, Auffredi and his wife Pernelle were forced to live on the streets of La Rochelle as beggars. During their time in destitute, the couple were helped by the city's nuns.

After waiting 7-years where he slipped into poverty, Auffredi's ships unexpectedly returned and made him rich again in 1203. The ships were carrying gold, ivory, spices, and precious woods. As evidenced by a papal bull issued by Pope Innocent III, Auffredi established the Saint Barthelemy Hospital with Pernelle using his new wealth, where he devoted himself to helping the poor and sick. The hospital also served as one of France's first maritime hospitals on the Atlantic as it cared for seafarers. Auffredi died around 1220.

== Saint Barthelemy Hospital ==
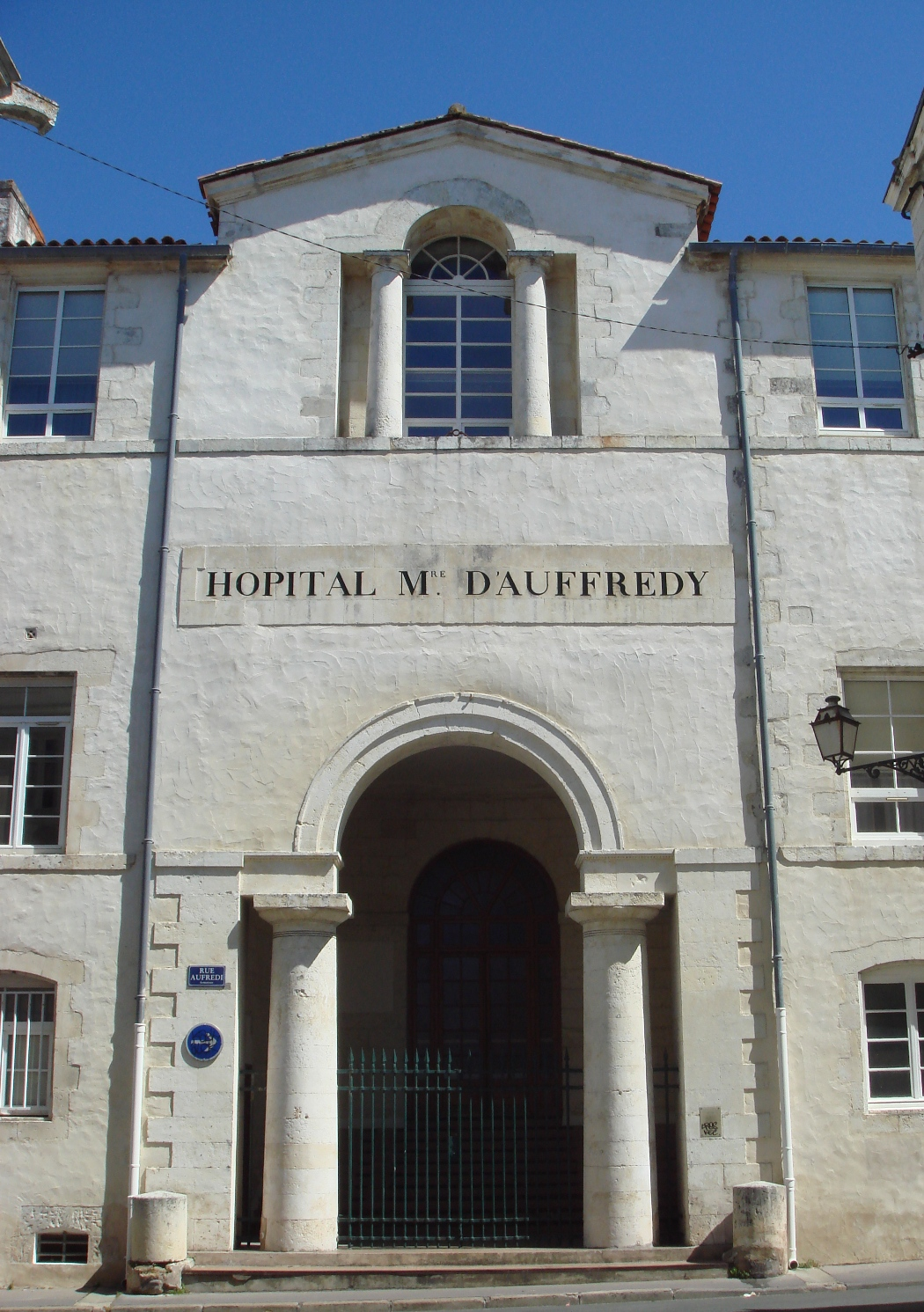
Auffredi (Saint Barthelemy) Hospital today, rue Auffredi, La Rochelle.

When Auffredi died around 1220, the hospital was handed over to the city. At the time of his death, it was a one-story building with a high roof and a chapel attached to its east side. Its west side was where the patients were kept. The chapel was consecrated as the Saint John the Baptist chapel in 1256. The hospital was expanded in 1420 when Guillaume Massicot, the governor of the hospital, built a large hall to its south. During the French Wars of Religion (1562 to 1598), Protestants (Huguenots) used the chapel to store artillery. Following the 1627-28 Siege of La Rochelle, King Louis XIII handed the hospital over to private ownership by giving it to the Brothers of Charity. Under their oversight, the Auffredi hall was enlarged and a church was built in the south with a courtyard separating from the hall Massicot had built. A boundary wall was built on Saint-Côme Street, and a cemetery was established in 1641. In 1704, a sickroom was made in the cellar and rooms were made to house monks.

Amidst the French Revolution, the monks were expelled when the hospital became city property again on 5 March 1791. The Ministry of War made negotiations for the hospital's acquisition during the Napoleonic Wars and it came under military control in 1804. In 1810, the church was demolished and the courtyard was cleared. The entire building was renovated and restored in 1814 and 1815, which also saw a new wing built. Further additions were made in the 19th century and the hospital was managed again by a military administration between 1840 and 1949. The street outside the hospital was renamed to Rue Aufredi in his honour.

== Legacy ==
Alexandre Auffredi is mentioned in Splendeurs et misères des courtisanes by Honoré de Balzac as an example of French entrepreneurship:

"Les fortunes colossales des Jacques Cœur, des Médici, des Ango de Dieppe, des Auffredi de La Rochelle, des Fugger, des Tiepolo, des Corner ..." Splendeurs et misères des courtisanes

In 2005, the Aufrédy Scout Group of the Scouts et Guides de France was formed by the merger of the Scouts de France (Saint-Louis group) and the Guides de France of La Rochelle. The group is named after Auffredi, and their blue and yellow scarfs symbolise the sea and the sun.
