= Vautrin =

Character in La Comédie humaine by Balzac

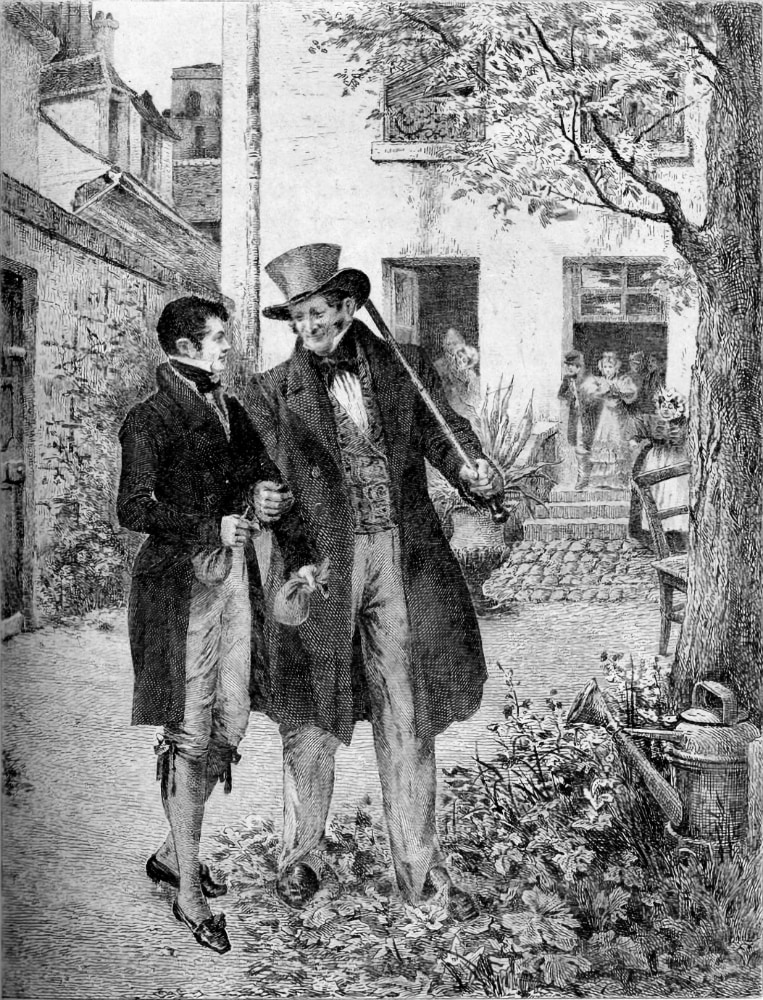
Vautrin and Eugene de Rastignac, in Father Goriot.

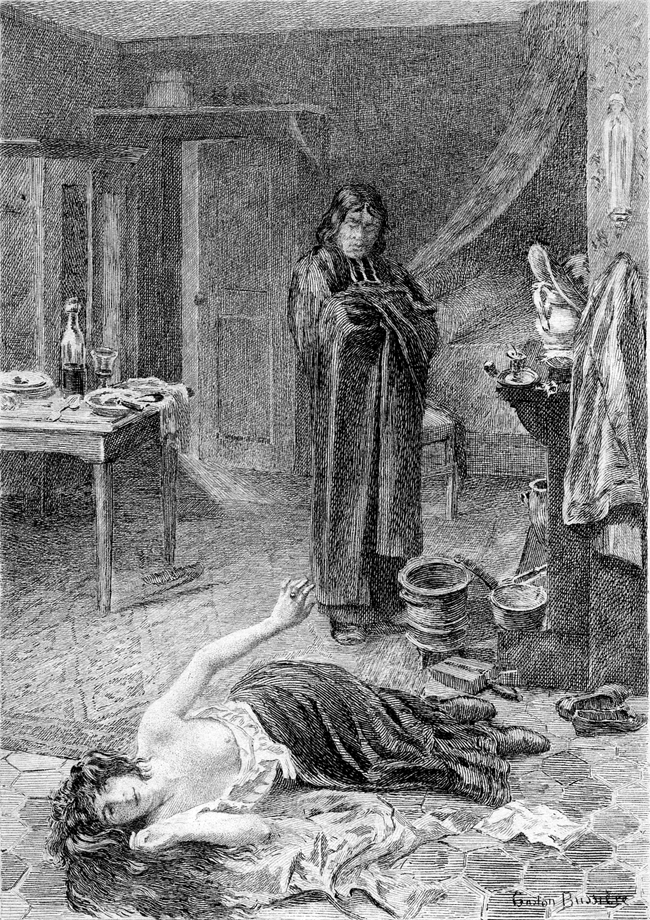
Vautrin over the body of Esther Van Gobseck, in The Splendors and Miseries of Courtesans.

Vautrin (French pronunciation: [votʁɛ̃]) is a character from the novels of French writer Honoré de Balzac in the La Comédie humaine series. His real name is Jacques Collin (pronounced [ʒɑk kɔlɛ̃]). He appears in the novels Le Père Goriot (Father Goriot, 1834/35) under the name Vautrin, and in Illusions perdues (Lost illusions, 1837–1843) and Splendeurs et misères des courtisanes (Scenes from a Courtesan's Life, 1838–1844), the sequel of Illusions perdues, under the name of Abbé Carlos Herrera. In prison, he got the nickname "Trompe-la-Mort" ("Dodgedeath" or "Cheats-Death"), because he managed to avoid the death sentence repeatedly.

== Background ==
By the time the Comédie humaine series begins, Jacques Collin is an escaped convict and criminal mastermind fleeing from the police. The character first appears in the La Comédie humaine series using the name of Vautrin, so he is usually referred to in literary criticism under this name. Balzac's inspiration for the character was Eugène François Vidocq (1775–1857), a former criminal who later became chief of the Paris police.

== Story ==
Little is known about Collin's early life. From the novels it can be gathered that was born in or around 1779, had an above-average education and that he worked as an apprentice in a bank—a position his aunt Jacqueline had obtained for him. In the first decade of the 19th century he first came into contact with the criminal underworld. When a young Italian soldier that Collin was interested in committed a forgery, Collin took the responsibility and was sentenced to five years' hard labour in 1810. Several attempted escapes have increased the sentence to 20 years by 1818, when the first novel that includes him takes place.

In Le Père Goriot, set in late 1818/early 1819 (or 1819/1820 when later novels refer to the events), Collin lived under the name of Vautrin in the House Vauquer after an escape from the Bagne of Toulon in 1815. He is described as a cynical man, who likes to crack jokes, speaks rather intimately with everyone, and seems to know everything and have been everywhere. He also is very adept at repairing locks. However, the police are on his tracks: The chief of the Sûreté, one Bibi-Lupin, under the name of Gondureau, confronts two other inhabitants of the House Vauquer, telling them that Vautrin is really the escaped convict Jacques Collin, who functions as a banker and a confidant to the Parisian underworld. Bibi-Lupin asks them to help arrest Vautrin but they need proof that he really is Jacques Collin. He gives them a drug that will knock Vautrin unconscious, so they can search on his shoulders for the branded letters T.F., which stand for "Travaux [forcés]" and "Faussaire" ("hard labor" and "forger"). The plan works and Collin is arrested and imprisoned in Rochefort. Later, it is revealed that Collin escapes prison disguised as a guard escorting another prisoner.

Some years later, in the novel Illusions Perdues, one Abbé Carlos Herrera stops Lucien de Rubempré from drowning himself in the Charente. He strikes a pact with Lucien: He will make him rich and successful but Lucien has to obey him without questions. The novel ends there.

In Splendeurs et misères de courtisanes, beginning in 1824, Herrera and Lucien have moved to Paris. Here we quickly learn that Herrera is really Collin. Lucien falls in love with one Esther Gobseck and they lead a happy life, although only meeting at nights, for approximately five years, until the Baron Nucingen glimpses Esther and falls in love with her. Collin realizes that they can get a lot of money out of Nucingen if he becomes Esther's lover. The money would then serve Lucien to marry the rich, but plain Clothilde de Grandlieu. They get the needed million together, but Esther kills herself after having had to sleep with Nucingen in May 1830. Her suicide note is not discovered, money is missing from her house and Herrera and Lucien are arrested on suspicion of having killed her.

The police suspect Herrera of being Collin but can't prove it. Collin, pretending that he is Lucien's true father to explain his affection for the young man, plays the role of the priest so admirably that the judge is nearly convinced. When Esther's suicide note and testament are found, Herrera's and Lucien's liberation seems to be only a matter of formalities. But Lucien cracks under questioning and reveals Herrera's true identity. Lucien subsequently hangs himself, but not without retracting everything he said, leaving doubts about Herrera's identity again.

Three of Collin's former partners in crime are also in prison but Collin convinces them to treat him as Abbé Herrera. He learns from them that his friend Théodore Calvi is awaiting execution and that another of the men, La Pouraille, also has no hopes of escaping the death sentence. Calvi was Vautrin's lover in Rochefort and the two escaped together. Collin uses his ingenuity to twist the facts and prove Calvi innocent (even though Calvi is in fact guilty) and saves La Pouraille too. This involves giving himself up: like his historical model Eugène François Vidocq he offers to serve as an informer to the prosecutor. After he manages to treat the madness of one of Lucien's former mistresses (she became mad after learning about Lucien's death, as her last talk with Lucien was a row) with one of Lucien's love letters to her, his offer is accepted.

A small note informs us that Collin remained chief of the Sûreté for fifteen years and retired in 1845.

Charles Rabou, who finished the novel The Deputy of Arcis after Balzac's death, included Vautrin in this story. However, his Vautrin loses most of his former genius. The novel gives Vautrin a son (unlikely, seeing as it is made very clear that he has never had any interest in women) and includes his death at the hands of a forger. Vautrin's later life story is not considered canon.

== Character ==
=== Tempter, criminal and nemesis ===
Vautrin is a seductive, enigmatic and complex character, not easily classified, not even as a villain. He is a well-built, strong man, about forty years old at the time he first appears in the series. Vautrin has a strong criminal energy and is ruthless in obtaining his purposes, manipulating people and sometimes resorting to murder. He tries to realize his dreams of power and wealth through Eugène de Rastignac and later through Lucien de Rubempré. In some respects, Vautrin/Collin/Abbé Herrera recalls the tempting devils in "pact with the devil" themes like Faust. He promises both young men fame, power and wealth and proposes to become their mentor. Yet, Vautrin's plans with them are thwarted: Rastignac is far too independent to need a mentor and Lucien is too dreamy, romantic and feeble to be able to realize Collin's dreams.

=== Lover ===
Though Vautrin's attraction towards Rastignac and Lucien apparently remains platonic, it is also erotic/sentimental in character, especially in the case of Lucien. The fact that he is not only bound to them by his hunger for power but also by emotional ties considerably increases the psychological tension of the novels and makes Collin's character more humane. Though he can often act as a real villain, his love, especially for Lucien, is obviously genuine, seeing the way he breaks down when informed of his death. Love even makes him sacrifice himself: he was first condemned to five years hard labour for a fake that a young "friend" (Franchessini) of his committed and for which Vautrin, even though he was innocent, took the blame. He does not claim so himself, the chief of the Sûreté, Bibi-Lupin, informs the reader of this fact. Vautrin had another young friend in prison, Théodore Calvi, nicknamed Madeleine. The goal of all his efforts of rehabilitation towards the end of Splendeurs et misères de courtisanes is eventually just to save "Madeleine" from the guillotine.

== Appearances ==
Vautrin, who appears in several Balzac novels, also has been a character in several plays and films. An American premiere of Nicholas Wright's play, The Crimes of Vautrin, based on characters who appear in Honore de Balzac's Human Comedy, opened the 1996 season of New York's SoHo Rep.

=== Novels ===
- Le Père Goriot
- Illusions perdues (only as Carlos Herrera)
- Splendeurs et misères des courtisanes
- The Deputy of Arcis (only in the ending by Charles Rabou, considered non-canon)
- La Cousine Bette (small, unnamed appearance)
- Le Contrat de mariage (mentioned)

=== Theatre plays ===
- Vautrin, forbidden in 1840
- Vautrin, by Émile Guirard, staged at the Comédie française in 1922
- Monsieur Vautrin by André Charpak, staged at the Théâtre Récamier
- Vautrin, extracted from Father Goriot, premiered January 14, 1986 in the Théâtre du Campagnol

=== Cinema ===
- Gabriel Signoret in Le Père Goriot (1921)
- Lionel Barrymore in Father Goriot (1926)
- Michel Simon in Vautrin (1943)
- Pierre Renoir in Le Père Goriot (1944)
- Willy A. Kleinau in Karriere in Paris (1952)
- Alfred Adam in Vautrin: La pension Vauquer, La maison d'Esther, L'adjuration de Vautrin (1957, three-part miniseries)
- Andrew Keir in Father Goriot (1968)
- Roger Jacquet in Le Père Goriot (1972)
- Georges Géret in Splendeurs et misères des courtisanes (1975)
- Jean-Pierre Cassel dans Rastignac ou les Ambitieux
- Tchéky Karyo in Le Père Goriot (2004)
