= Splendeurs et misères des courtisanes =

Novel by Honoré de Balzac

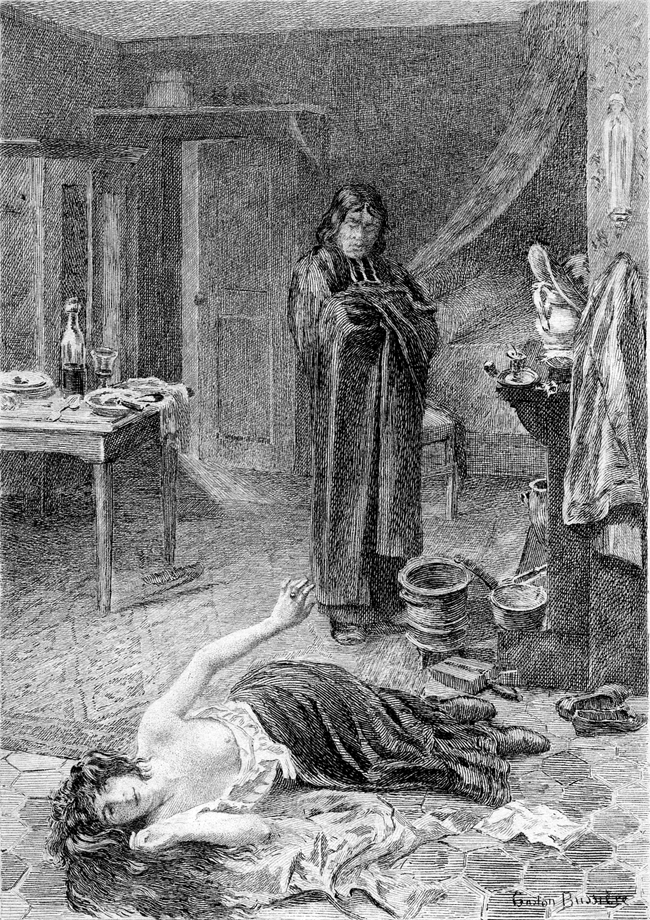
- Vautrin finds Esther van Gobseck.
- Author: Honoré de Balzac
- Illustrator: Gaston Bussière
- Language: French
- Series: La Comédie humaine
- Publisher: Edmond Werdet
- Publication date: 1838–1847
- Publication place: France
- Preceded by: La Maison Nucingen
- Followed by: Les Secrets de la princesse de Cadignan

Splendeurs et misères des courtisanes, translated variously as The Splendors and Miseries of Courtesans, A Harlot High and Low, or as Lost Souls, is an 1838–1847 novel by French novelist Honoré de Balzac, published in four initially separate parts:

- Esther Happy (Esther heureuse, 1838)
- What Love Costs an Old Man (À combien l’amour revient aux vieillards, 1843)
- The End of Evil Ways (Où mènent les mauvais chemins, 1846)
- The Last Incarnation of Vautrin (La Dernière incarnation de Vautrin, 1847)

It continues the story of Lucien de Rubempré, who was a main character in Illusions perdues, a preceding Balzac novel. Splendeurs et misères des courtisanes forms part of Balzac's La Comédie humaine.

== Plot summary ==
Lucien de Rubempré and the self-proclaimed Abbé Carlos Herrera (Vautrin) have made a pact, in which Lucien will achieve success in Paris if he agrees to follow Vautrin's instructions blindly. Esther van Gobseck throws a wrench into Vautrin's best-laid plans, however, because Lucien falls in love with her and she with him. Instead of forcing Lucien to abandon her, he allows Lucien this secret affair, but also makes good use of it. For four years, Esther remains locked away in a house in Paris, taking walks only at night. One night, however, the incredibly rich banker Baron de Nucingen spots her and falls deeply in love with her. When Vautrin discovers Nucingen's obsession with Esther, he decides to use her power over him as a tool to help advance Lucien by extracting the maximum amount of money from the Baron as possible.

Vautrin and Lucien need the money for two main reasons: they are 60,000 francs in debt due to the lavish lifestyle that Lucien has had to maintain, and one million francs are required to buy back the former Rubempré land so that Lucien can marry Clotilde, the rich but ugly daughter of the Grandlieus.

Things don't work out as smoothly as Vautrin would have liked, however, because Esther commits suicide after giving herself to Nucingen for the first and only time (after making him wait for months). Since the police are already scrutinizing Vautrin and Lucien, they arrest the two on suspicion of murder over the suicide. This turn of events is particularly tragic because it turns out that only hours before, Esther had actually inherited a huge amount of money from an estranged family member. If only she had held on, she could have married Lucien herself.

Lucien, ever the poet, doesn't do well in prison. Although Vautrin actually manages to fool his interrogators into believing that he might be Carlos Herrera, a priest on a secret mission for the Spanish king, Lucien succumbs easily to the wiles of his interviewer. He tells his interrogator, the judge Camusot, everything, including Vautrin's true identity. Afterwards, he regrets what he has done and hangs himself in his cell.

His suicide, like Esther's, is badly timed. In an effort not to compromise the high-society ladies who were involved with him, the justices had arranged to let Lucien go. But when he kills himself, things get more sticky and the maneuverings more desperate. It turns out that Vautrin possesses the very compromising letters sent by these women to Lucien, and he uses them to negotiate his release. He also manages to save and assist several of his accomplices along the way, helping them to avoid a death sentence or abject poverty.

At the end of the novel, Vautrin actually becomes a senior member of the police force before retiring in 1845. The nobility that was so fearful for its reputation moves on to other affairs.

== Main characters ==
- Esther Van Gobseck, former courtesan and lover of Lucien, assigned to seducing Nucingen. She commits suicide after sleeping with Nucingen for money.
- Lucien de Rubempré, ambitious young poet protected by Vautrin, trying to marry Clotilde de Grandlieu. He commits suicide in prison.
- Vautrin, escaped convict with the alias Carlos Herrera, real name Jacques Collin, nickname Trompe-la-Mort. He has a weakness for pretty young men and tries to help Lucien move up in society in every unscrupulous way possible.
- Baron de Nucingen, wealthy financier obsessed with Esther and the target of Vautrin's money machinations.
- Jacqueline Collin, aunt of Vautrin, alias of Asie. She is charged with watching over Esther and helping Vautrin in his various schemes.
- Clotilde de Grandlieu, target of Lucien's affections, key to his advancement in society. However, he cannot marry her unless he buys back his family's ancient land, worth one million francs. Her father prevents the marriage after finding out that the money, which actually came from Esther, did not really come from an inheritance from Lucien's father, as Lucien was claiming.
- Comtesse de Sérizy and Duchesse de Maufrigneuse, former lovers of Lucien. Vautrin possesses very compromising letters from them to Lucien.
- Camusot de Marville, Comte de Granville, judge and magistrate respectively. They try to resolve the case of Vautrin and Lucien without compromising the upper-class ladies involved.
- Peyrade, Contenson, Corentin, Bibi-Lupin, spies of various sorts associated with the police. They try to incriminate Vautrin for various personal reasons.

== Translations ==
In 2021, Raymond N. MacKenzie's translation, Lost Souls, was published by the University of Minnesota Press.

Rayner Heppenstall's translation for Penguin Classics was titled A Harlot High and Low.

Ellen Marriage, under the pseudonym of "James Waring," produced a translation that was published under the titles A Harlot's Progress (J. M. Dent, 1896) and Scenes from a Courtesan's Life.

== Bibliography ==
- David F. Bell, "Zola’s Fin-de-Siècle Pessimism: Knowledge in Crisis", L’Esprit Créateur, Winter 1992, n° 32 (4), p. 21–29.
- Charles Bernheimer, "Prostitution and Narrative: Balzac’s Splendeurs et misères des courtisanes", L’Esprit Créateur, Summer 1985, n° 25 (2), p. 22–31.
- Peter Brooks, "Balzac: Epistemophilia and the Collapse of the Restoration", Yale French Studies, 2001, n° 101, p. 119–31.
- A. S. Byatt, "The Death of Lucien de Rubempré", The Novel: Volume 2: Forms and Themes, Princeton, Princeton UP, 2006, p. 389–408.
- (in French) Maksoud Feghali, "La Peinture de la société dans Splendeurs et misères des courtisanes de Balzac", The Language Quarterly, 1985 Spring-Summer, n° 23 (3–4), p. 29-30.
- (in French) Francine Goujon, "Morel ou la dernière incarnation de Lucien", Bulletin d’Informations Proustiennes, 2001–2002, n° 32, p. 41-62.
- (in French) Rainier Grutman, "Le Roman glottophage", Règles du genre et inventions du génie, London, Mestengo, 1999, p. 29-44.
- Pierre L. Horn, "The Judicial Police in the Novels of Balzac", Clues, 1987 Spring-Summer, n° 8 (1), p. 41-50.
- (in French) Martine Léonard, « Balzac et la question du langage : l’exemple de Splendeurs et misères des courtisanes », Langues du XIXe siècle, Toronto, Centre d’Études du XIXe siècle Joseph Sablé, 1998, p. 59-68.
- D. A. Miller, "Balzac’s Illusions Lost and Found", Yale French Studies, 1984, n° 67, p. 164-81.
- Allan H. Pasco, "Balzac and the Art of the Macro-Emblem in Splendeurs et misères des courtisanes", L’Esprit Créateur, Fall 1982, n° 22 (3), p. 72-81.
- Christopher Prendergast, "Melodrama and Totality in Splendeurs et misères des courtisanes", Novel, Winter 1973, n° 6 (2), p. 152-62.
- Maurice Samuels, "Metaphors of Modernity: Prostitutes, Bankers, and Other Jews in Balzac’s Splendeurs et misères des courtisanes", Romanic Review, Mar 2006, n° 97 (2), p. 169-84.
- Peter Schunck, "Balzacs Splendeurs et miseres des courtisanes und der Kriminalroman", Lebendige Romania: Festschrift fur Hans-Wilhelm Klein uberreicht von seinen Freunden und Schulern, Goppingen, Kummerle, 1976, p. 381-402.
