= Gaston Bussière =

French painter

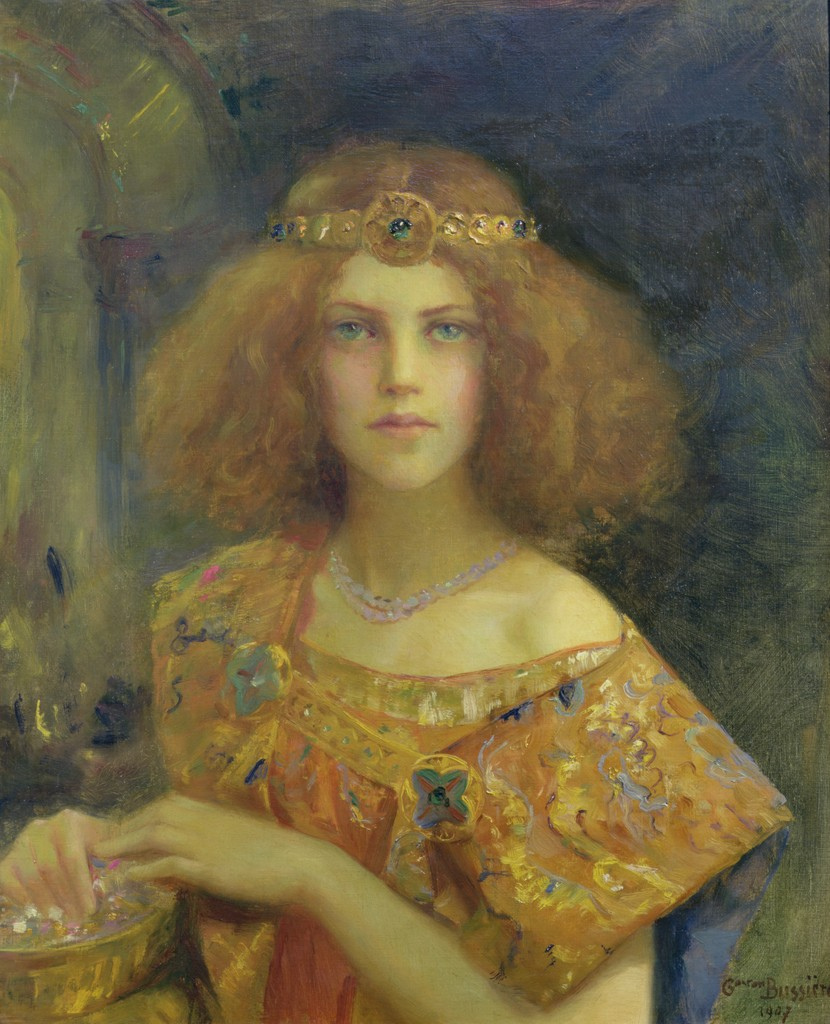
Salammbô, painted by Gaston Bussière, 1907

Gaston Bussière (24 April 1862 in Cuisery – 29 October 1928 or 1929 in Saulieu) was a French Symbolist painter and illustrator.

== Biography ==
Bussière studied at l'Académie des Beaux-Arts in Lyon before entering the école des beaux-arts de Paris where he studied under Alexandre Cabanel and Pierre Puvis de Chavannes. In 1884, he won the Marie Bashkirtseff prize.

He was close to Gustave Moreau. He found inspiration in the theatre works of Berlioz (La Damnation de Faust) as well as William Shakespeare and Richard Wagner. He became in demand as an illustrator, creating works for major authors. He illustrated Honoré de Balzac's Splendeurs et misères des courtisanes published in 1897, Émaux et camées, written by Théophile Gautier, as well as Oscar Wilde's Salomé. He also illustrated several works by Flaubert.

An associate of Joséphin Péladan, the founder of the Rose-Croix esthétique, Bussière exhibited his works at Salon de la Rose-Croix over two years.

Many of his works are on exhibit at the Musée des Ursulines in Mâcon.

== Gallery ==
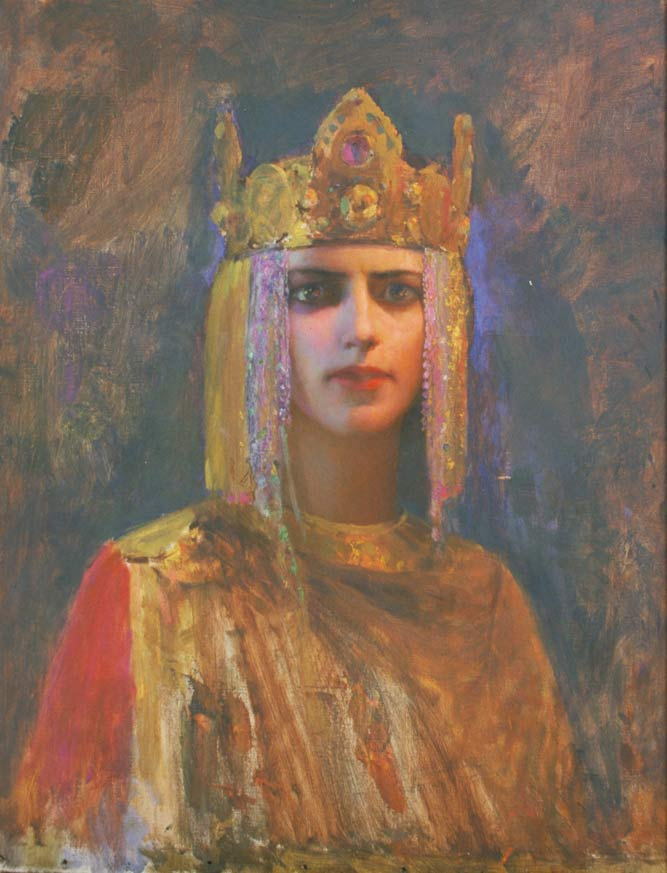
Yseult the Blonde

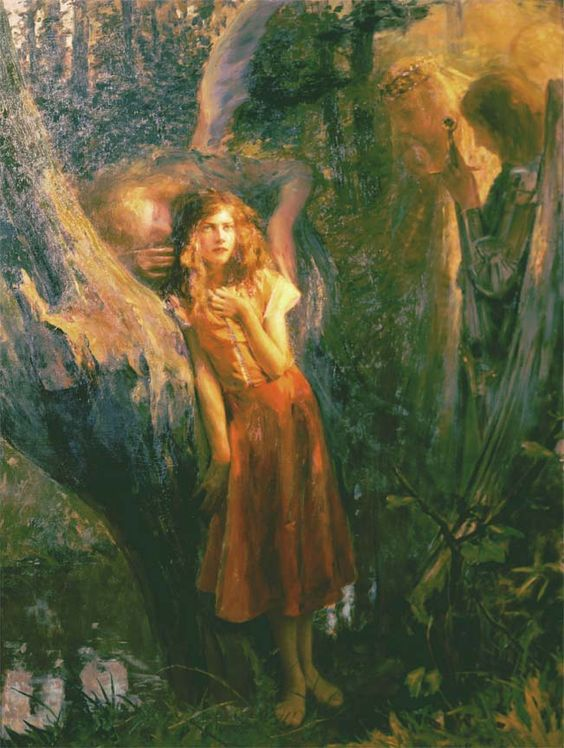
Jeanne d'Arc

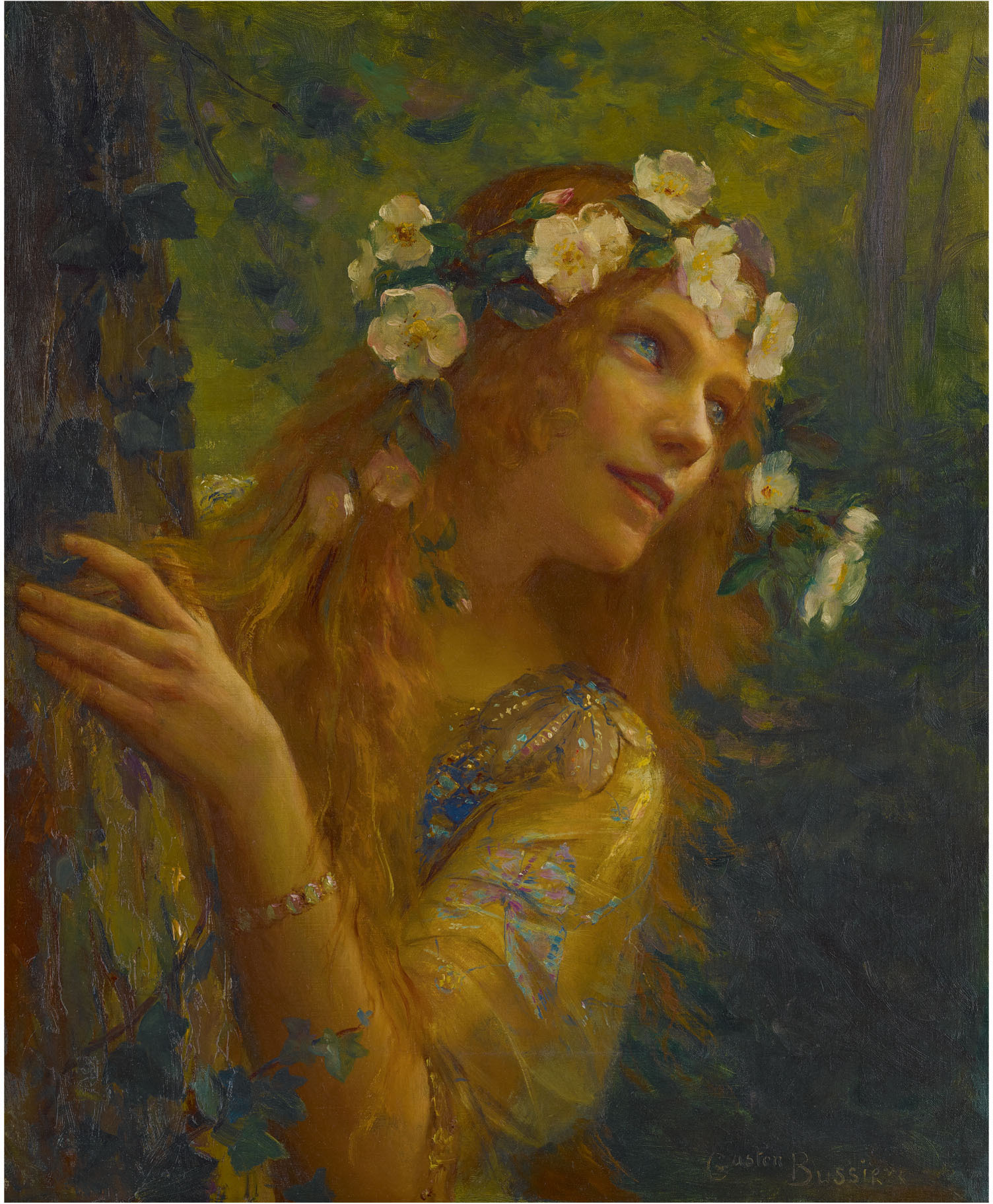
Leilah (1913)

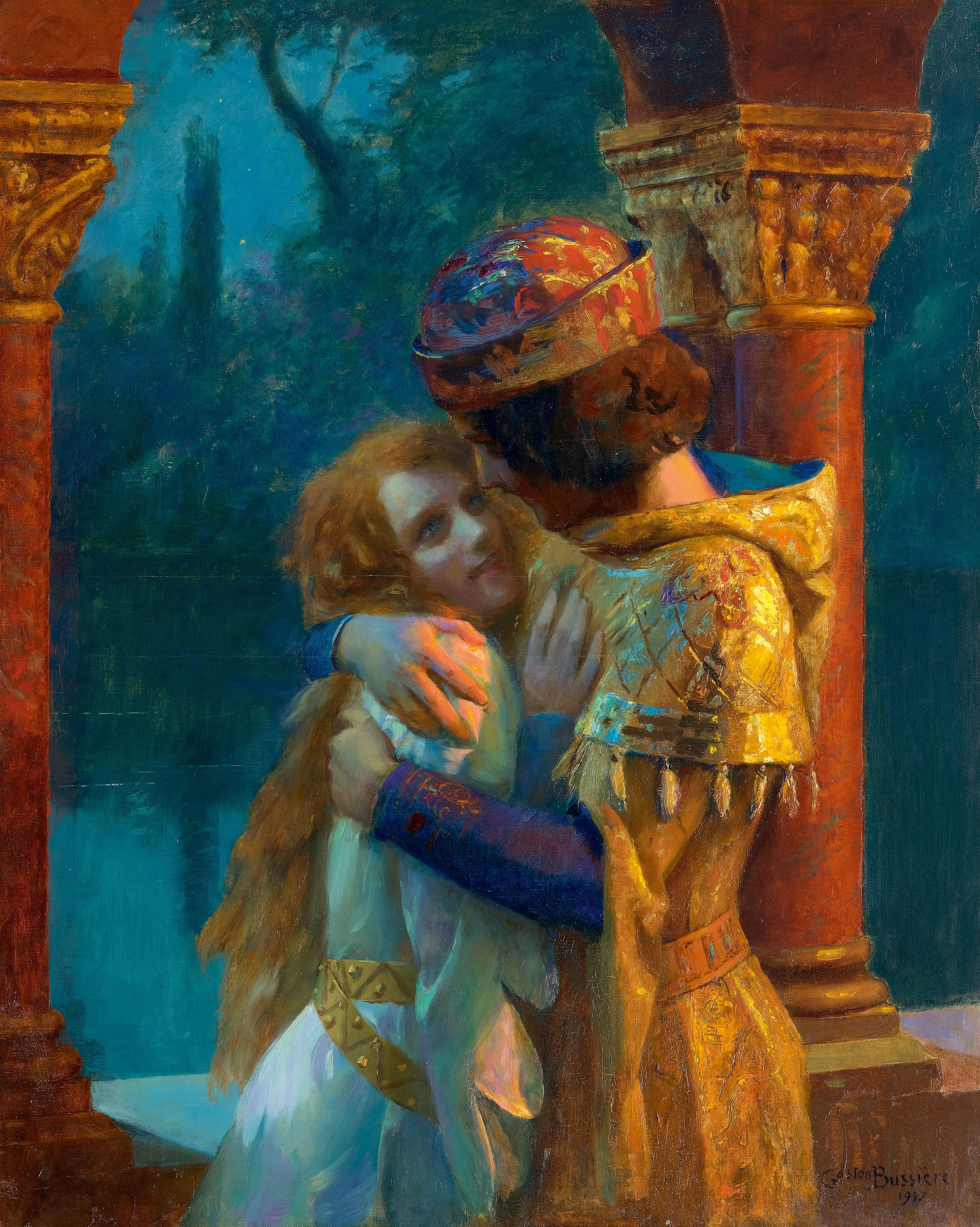
Embrace in Evening Light (1927)

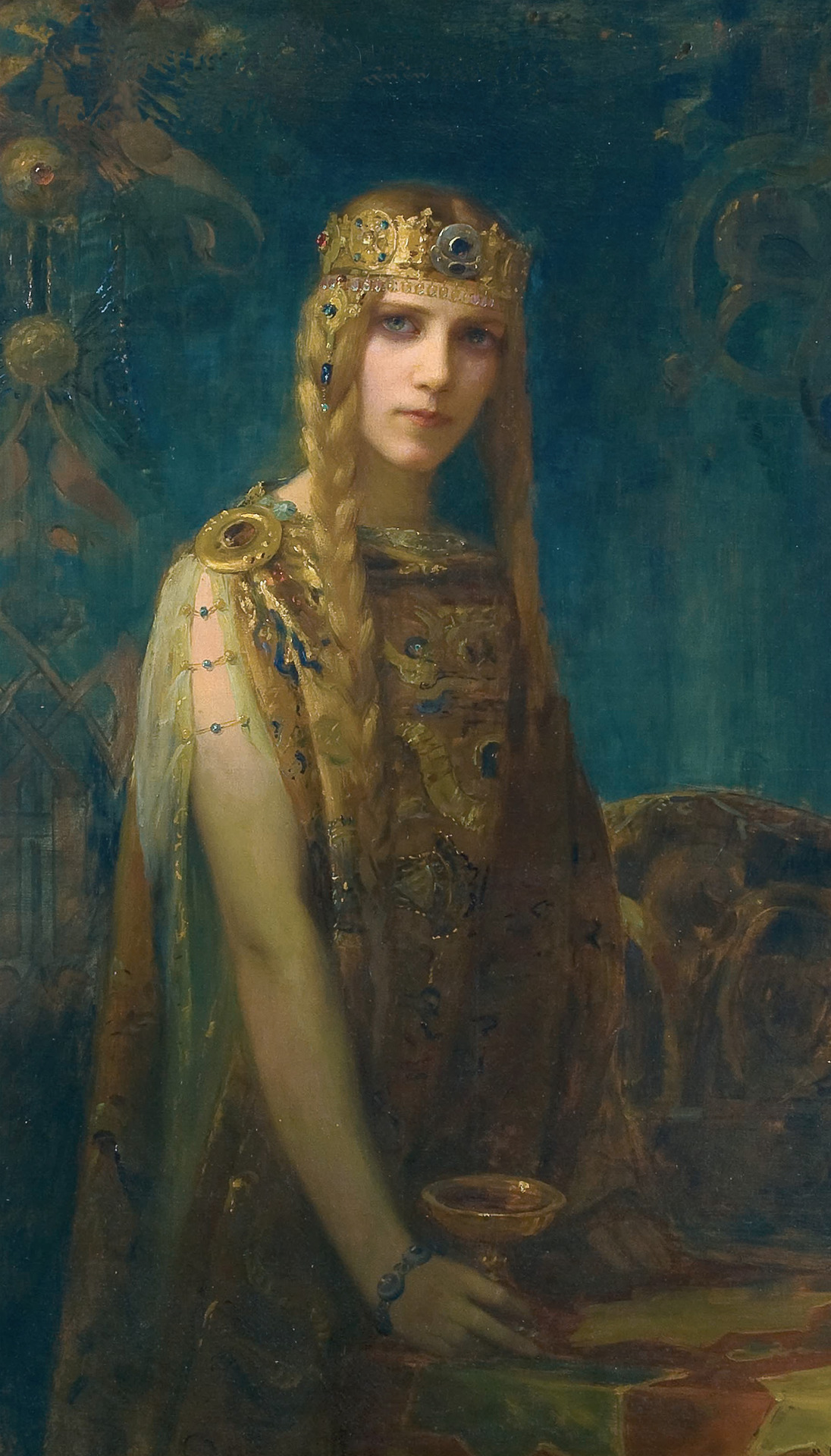
Isolde: La Princesse Celte (1911)

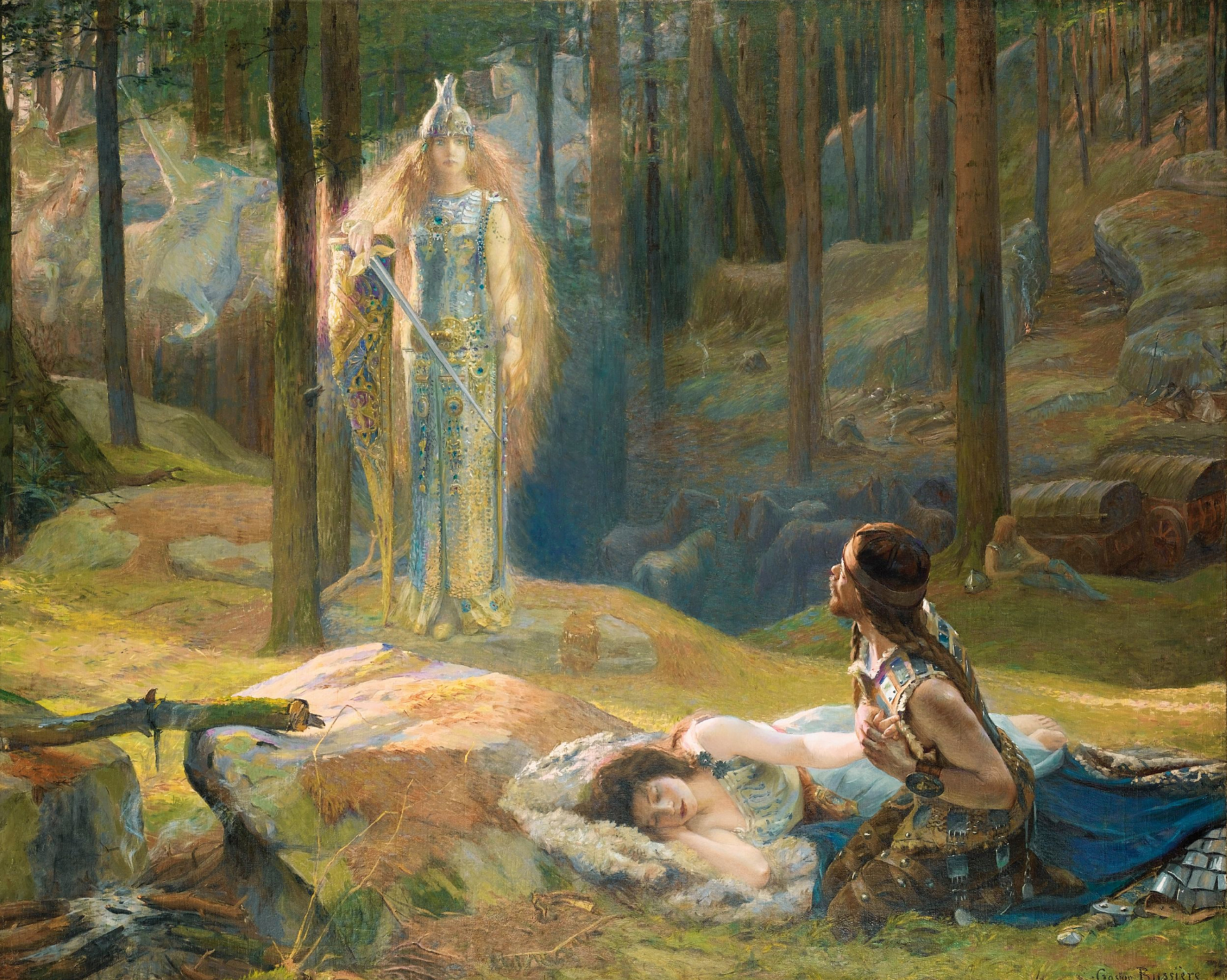
The Revelation: Brünnhilde discovering Sieglinde and Siegmund (1894)

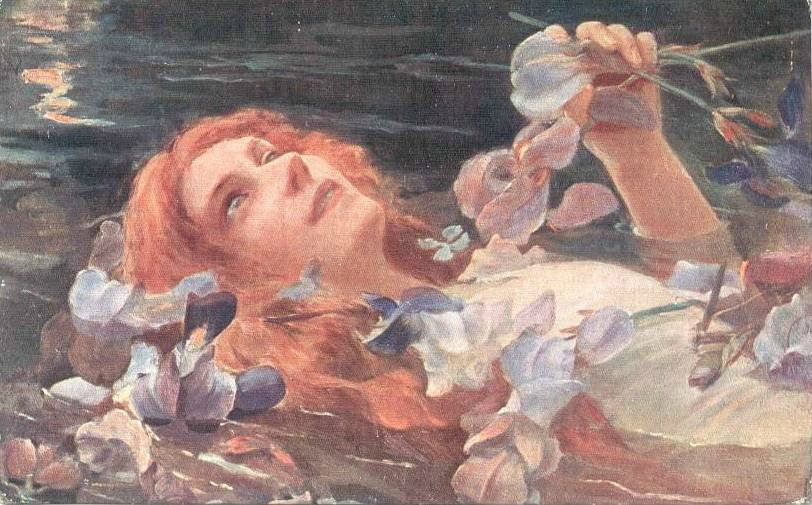
Ophelia (circa 1900)

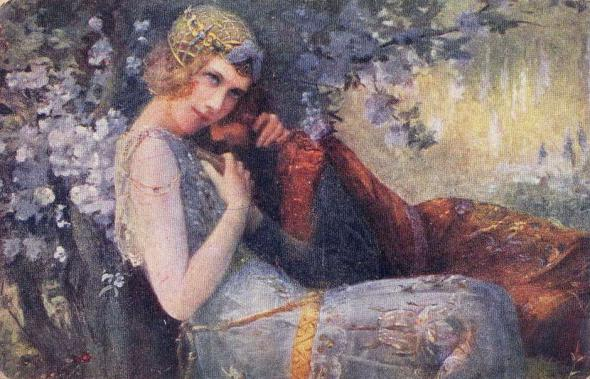
Viviane and Merlin (circa 1900)

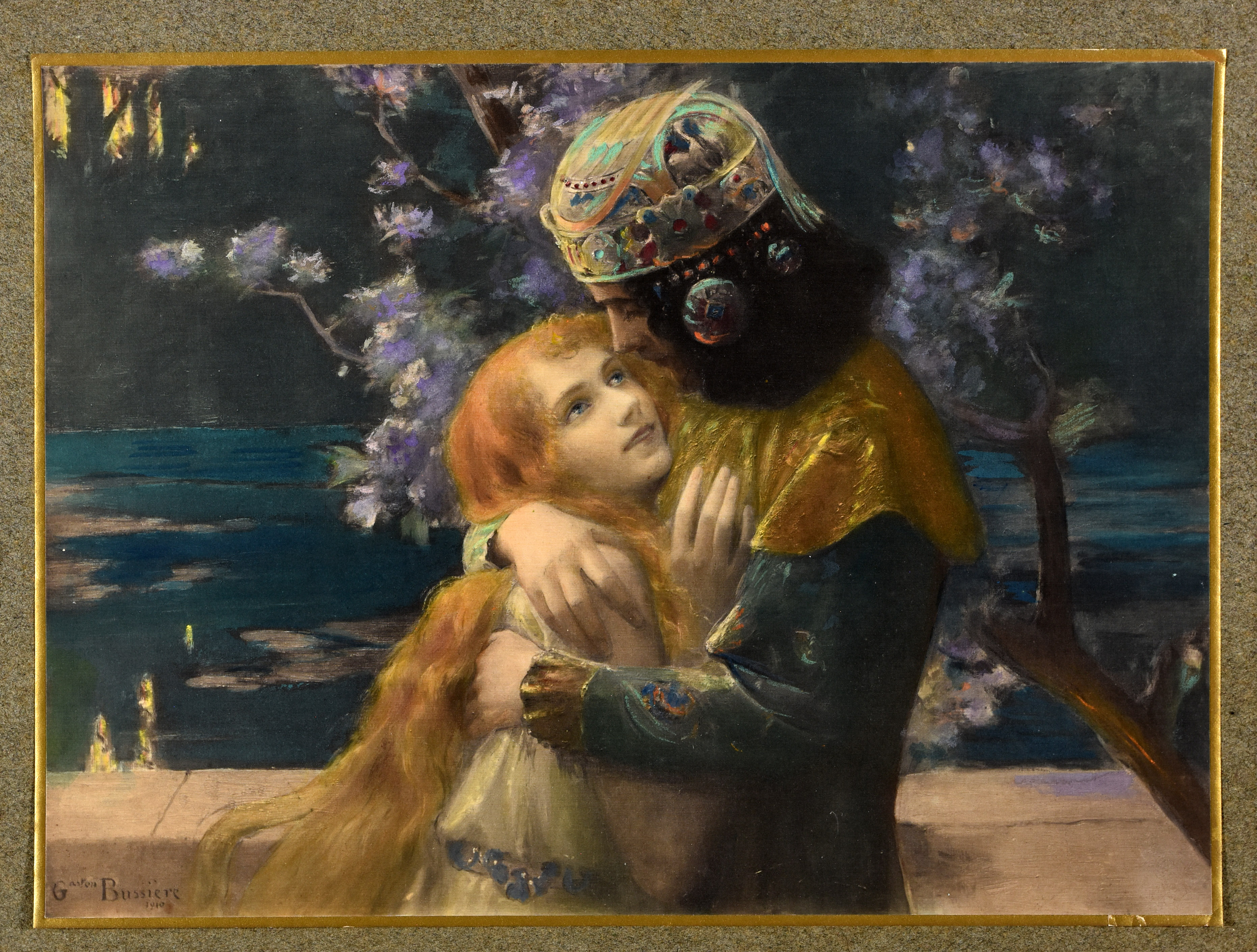
Elsa and Lohengrin (1910)

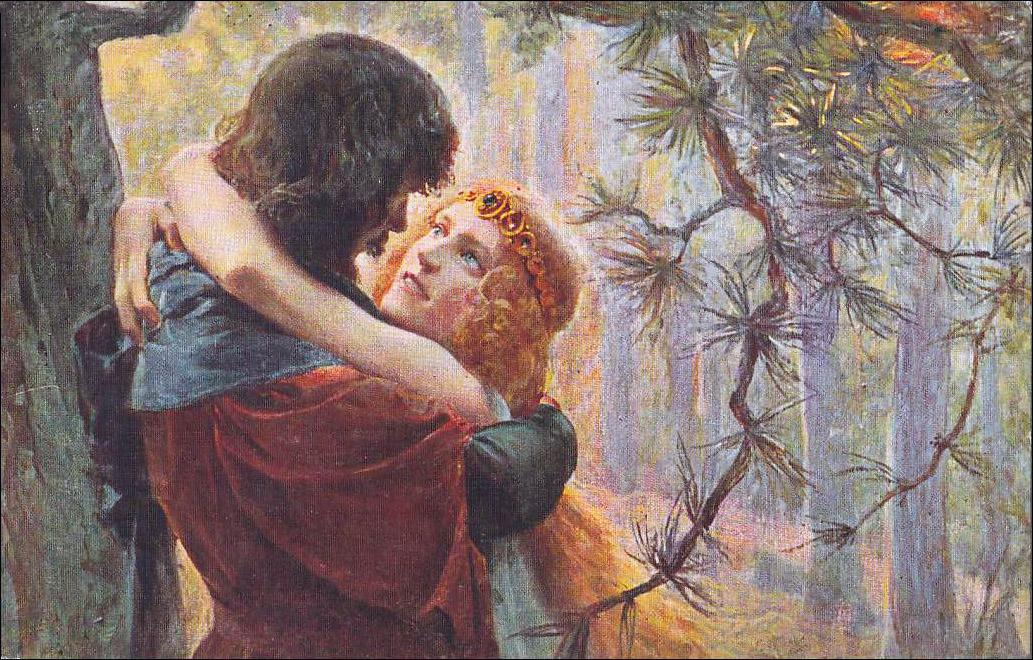
Tristan and Iseult (1911)
