= Illusions perdues =

1843 novel by Honoré de Balzac

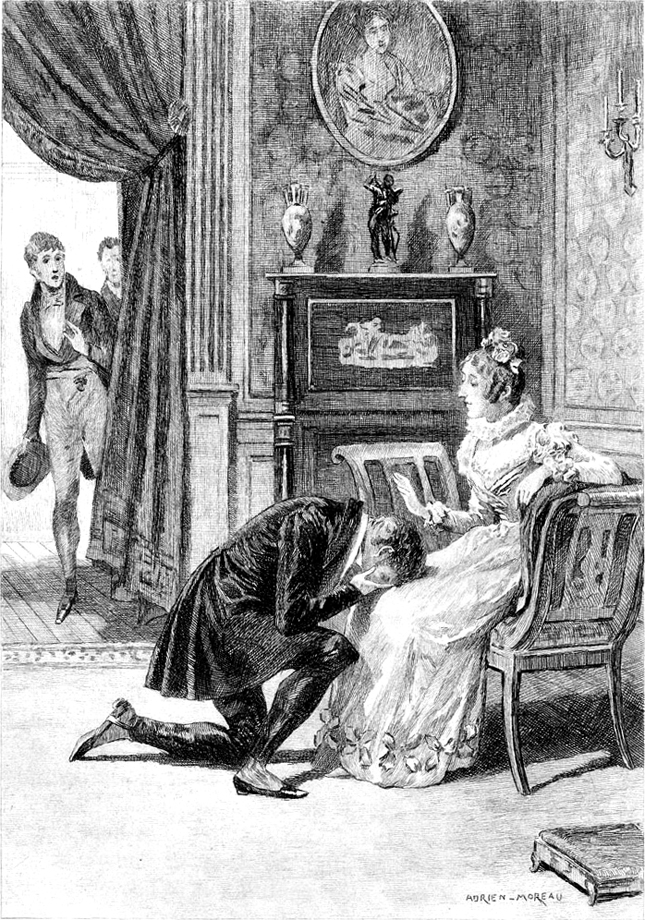
- Title page of Honoré de Balzac's Lost Illusions, Mme de Bargeton's Boudoir (1837).
- Author: Honoré de Balzac
- Language: French
- Series: La Comédie humaine
- Publication date: 1837–1843
- Publication place: France

Illusions perdues — in English, Lost Illusions — is a serial novel written by the French writer Honoré de Balzac between 1837 and 1843. It consists of three parts, starting in provincial France, thereafter moving to Paris, and finally returning to the provinces. The book resembles another of Balzac's greatest novels, La Rabouilleuse (The Black Sheep, 1842), that is set in Paris and in the provinces. It forms part of the Scènes de la vie de province in La Comédie humaine.

== Background ==
The novel's main character, Lucien Chardon, works as a journalist, and his friend David Séchard is a printer. These were both professions with which Balzac himself had experience. Balzac had started a printing business in Paris in 1826, which went bankrupt in 1828. His experiences influenced his description of David Séchard's working life. Balzac had bought the newspaper La Chronique de Paris in 1836 and founded La Revue Parisienne in 1840, both of which also went bust. A number of his novels had been published in serial form in the newspapers, though he often had disagreements with the publishers. He had also received harsh reviews in the newspapers from critics such as Charles Augustin Sainte-Beuve and Jules Janin. Balzac had been critical of the press in La Peau de chagrin and later published a criticism of the press called Monograph of the Paris Press in 1842.

== Writing and publication ==
Illusions perdues was published in three parts.

- 1837 — Les Deux Poètes (The Two Poets), Paris: Werdet
- 1839 — Un grand homme de province à Paris (A Great Man of the Provinces in Paris), Paris: Souverain
- 1843 — Ève et David (Eve and David), Paris: Furne

The titles of the various constituent parts of Illusions perdues, which came out over a period of six years, vary considerably from edition to edition and also because of publication in serial form. The eventual title of Part III, Les Souffrances de l’inventeur (The Inventor’s Sufferings), was superimposed by Balzac onto his personal copy of the Furne edition of La Comédie humaine. The Two Poets includes sonnets by the main character. In real life, these were written by poet friends of Balzac's including Théophile Gautier.

== Plot summary ==
Lucien Chardon, the son of a lower middle-class father and an impoverished mother of aristocratic descent, is the pivotal figure of the entire work. Living at Angoulême, he is impoverished, impatient, handsome and ambitious. His widowed mother, his sister Ève and his best friend, David Séchard, do nothing to lessen his high opinion of his own talents, for it is an opinion they share. Even as Part I of Illusions perdues, Les Deux poètes (The Two Poets), begins, Lucien has already written a historical novel and a sonnet sequence, whereas David is a scientist. Theirs is a fraternity of poetic aspiration, whether as scientist or writer, even before David marries Ève, the two young men are spiritual brothers. Lucien is introduced into the drawing-room of the leading figure of Angoulême high society, Mme de Bargeton, who rapidly becomes infatuated with him. It is not long before the pair flee to Paris where Lucien adopts his maternal patronymic of de Rubempré and hopes to make his mark as a poet. Mme de Bargeton, on the other hand, recognises her mésalliance and though remaining in Paris, severs all ties with Lucien, abandoning him to a life of destitution.

In Part II, Un Grand homme de province à Paris, Lucien is contrasted with the journalist Lousteau and the high-minded writer Daniel d'Arthez. Jilted by Mme de Bargeton for the adventurer Sixte du Châtelet, he moves in a social circle of high-class actress-prostitutes and their journalist lovers: soon he becomes the lover of Coralie. As a literary journalist he prostitutes his talent, yet still harbours the ambition of belonging to high society and longs to assume by royal warrant the surname and coat of arms of the de Rubemprés. He switches his allegiance from the liberal opposition press to the one or two royalist newspapers that support the government. This act of betrayal earns him the implacable hatred of his erstwhile journalist colleagues, who destroy Coralie's theatrical reputation. In the depths of his despair he forges his brother-in-law's name on three promissory notes. This is his ultimate betrayal of his integrity as a person. After Coralie's death he returns in disgrace to Angoulême, stowed away behind the Châtelets' carriage; Mme de Bargeton has just married du Châtelet, who has been appointed prefect of that region.

In Part III, Les Souffrances de l'inventeur, in Angoulême David Séchard is betrayed on all sides but is supported by his loving wife. He invents a new and cheaper method of paper production. At a thematic level, the advances of paper-manufacturing processes are very closely interwoven with the commercialization of literature. Lucien's forgery of his brother-in-law's signature almost bankrupts David, who has to sell the secret of his invention to business rivals. Lucien is about to commit suicide when he is approached by a sham Jesuit priest, the Abbé Carlos Herrera. He is the escaped convict Vautrin whom Balzac had already presented in Le Père Goriot. Herrera takes Lucien under his protection and they drive off to Paris, there to begin a fresh assault on the capital. Lucien's story continues in Splendeurs et misères des courtisanes.

== Themes ==
=== Provincial life ===
The lifestyle of the provinces is juxtaposed with that of the metropolis, as Balzac contrasts the varying tempos of life at Angoulême and in Paris, the different standards of living in those cities and their different perceptions.

=== Artistic life in Paris ===
Balzac explores the artistic life of Paris in 1821–22 and the nature of the artistic life generally. Lucien, who was already a not quite published author when the novel begins, fails to get his early literary work published whilst he is in Paris, and during his time in the capital writes nothing of any consequence. Daniel d'Arthez, on the other hand, does not actively seek literary fame; it comes to him because of his solid literary merit.

=== Journalism ===
Balzac denounces journalism, presenting it as the most pernicious form of intellectual prostitution. Throughout the book, the literary industry is compared to the fashion industry, for instance by using identical terms: “plume” describes a writing utensil and an ornament for hats; “tournure” and “style” are forms of writing and dressing; “boutiques” sell books and clothing. These linguistic doubles unveil the business interest in journalism, which, like fashion, seeks novelty and superficial appeal.

=== Duplicity ===
Balzac affirms the duplicity of all things, both in Paris and at Angoulême, e.g., the character of Lucien de Rubempré, who even has two surnames; David Séchard's ostensible friend, the notary Petit-Claud, who operates against his client, not for him; the legal comptes (accounts) which are contes fantastiques (fantastic tales); the theatre which lives by make-believe; high society likewise; the Abbé Carlos Herrera who is a sham priest, and in fact a criminal; the Sin against the Holy Ghost, whereby Lucien abandons his true integrity as a person, forging his brother-in-law's signature and even contemplating suicide.

== Narrative strategies ==
(1) Although Illusions perdues is a commentary upon the contemporary world, Balzac is vague in his delineation of the historico-political background. His delineation of the broader social background is far more precise.

(2) Illusions perdues employs several changes of tempo. Even the change of tempo from Part II to Part III is but a superficial point of contrast between life as it is lived in the capital and life in the provinces. Everywhere the same laws of human behaviour apply. A person's downfall may come from the rapier thrust of the journalist or from the slowly strangling machinations of the law.

(3) Most notably in La Cousine Bette Balzac was one of the first novelists to employ the technique of in medias res. In Illusions perdues there is an unusual example of this, Part II of the novel serving as the prelude to the extended flashback which follows in Part III.

(4) Illusions perdues is also full of the "sublimities and degradations", "excited emphasis" and "romantic rhetoric" to which F.R. Leavis had objected in Le Père Goriot. Characters and viewpoints are polarized. There is the strong and perhaps somewhat artificial contrast between Lucien and David, art and science, Lousteau and d’Arthez, journalism and literature, Paris and the provinces, etc. And this polarization reaches the point of melodrama as Balzac appears to draw moral distinctions between "vice" and "virtue". Coralie is the Fallen Woman, Ève an Angel of strength and purity. Yet Balzac also describes Coralie's love for Lucien as a form of redemptive purity, an "absolution" and a "benediction". Thus, through what structurally is melodrama, he underlines what he considers to be the fundamental resemblance of opposites.

(5) Introduced into narrative fiction by the Gothic novel (The Castle of Otranto, The Mysteries of Udolpho, The Monk), melodrama was widespread in literature around the time when Illusions perdues was written. Jane Austen satirizes it in Northanger Abbey. Eugène Sue made regular use of it. Instances in Illusions perdues are the use of improbable coincidence; Lucien, in an endeavour to pay Coralie's funeral expenses, writing bawdy love-songs when her body is hardly yet cold; and the deus ex machina (or Satanas ex machina?) in the form of Herrera's appearance at the end of the novel.

(6) Like all the major works of the Comédie humaine, Illusions perdues focuses on the social nexus. Within the nexus of love, in her relationship with Lucien, Coralie is life-giving: her love has a sacramental quality. In an environment of worldly manœuvring, her influence upon him is fatal. She is, in other words, both a Fallen and a Risen Woman, depending upon the nexus within which she is viewed. In the unpropitious environment of Angoulême, Mme de Bargeton is an absurd bluestocking; transplanted to Paris, she undergoes an immediate "metamorphosis", becoming a true denizen of high society – and rightfully, in Part III, the occupant of the préfecture at Angoulême. As to whether Lucien's writings have any value, the social laws are paramount, this is a fact which he does not realize until it is too late.

(7) Illusions perdues is, according to Donald Adamson, "a revelation of the secret workings of the world, rather than a Bildungsroman illuminating the development of character".

== Sequel ==
The success of this novel inspired Balzac to write a four-part sequel, Splendeurs et misères des courtisanes (published in parts from 1838 to 1847). Illusions perdues and Splendeurs et misères des courtisanes form part of La Comédie humaine, the series of novels and short stories written by Balzac depicting French society in the period of the Bourbon Restoration and July Monarchy (1815–1848).

== Adaptations ==
Illusions perdues had been adapted several times for film, television, and stage.

- In 1966, Illusions perdues aired as a 4-episode television adaptation, directed by Maurice Cazeneuve, starring Yves Rénier as Lucien.
- In April 2011, a ballet of the same name inspired by Balzac's novel was staged by the Bolshoi Ballet. It was choreographed by Alexei Ratmansky, and went on to open at the Palais Garnier in Paris in 2014.
- A French film adaptation, Lost Illusions, was screened at the 78th Venice Film Festival and released on October 20, 2021. It is directed by Xavier Giannoli and stars Benjamin Voisin as Lucien du Rubempré, with a supporting cast including Gérard Depardieu, Cécile de France, and Xavier Dolan.
- A stage adaptation by Pauline Bayle, performed at the Théâtre de la Bastille in Paris from September to October 2021.

== English translations ==
- Katherine Prescott Wormeley (Roberts Bros., 1893) in two volumes: Lost Illusions: The Two Poets; Eve and David and A Great Man of the Provinces in Paris.
- Ellen Marriage (J. M. Dent, 1897) in two volumes: Lost Illusions: Two Poets; Eve and David and A Distinguished Provincial at Paris.
- Kathleen Raine (John Lehmann, 1951). Lost Illusions.
- Herbert J. Hunt (Penguin, 1971). Lost Illusions.
- Raymond N. MacKenzie (University of Minnesota, 2020). Lost Illusions.

== Bibliography ==
Works of criticism

- Adamson, Donald (1981) "Illusions perdues", London: Grant & Cutler
- Baron, Anne-Marie (1996) "Artifices de mise en scène et art de l’illusion chez Balzac", in: L’Année balzacienne, 1996, pp. 23–35
- Bérard, Suzanne-Jean (1961) La Genèse d’un roman de Balzac: "Illusions perdues", 2 vols, Paris: Colin
- Borderie, Régine (2005) "Esthétique du bizarre: Illusions perdues", in: L’Année balzacienne, 2005, pp. 175–98
- Lukács, György (1967) "Illusions perdues", in Balzac et le réalisme français, Paris: Maspéro, pp. 48–68
- Prendergast, Christopher (1978) Balzac: fiction and melodrama. London: Edward Arnold

== See also ==
- 1837 in literature
