= La Maison Nucingen =

Short story by Honoré de Balzac

- Short story by Honoré de Balzac
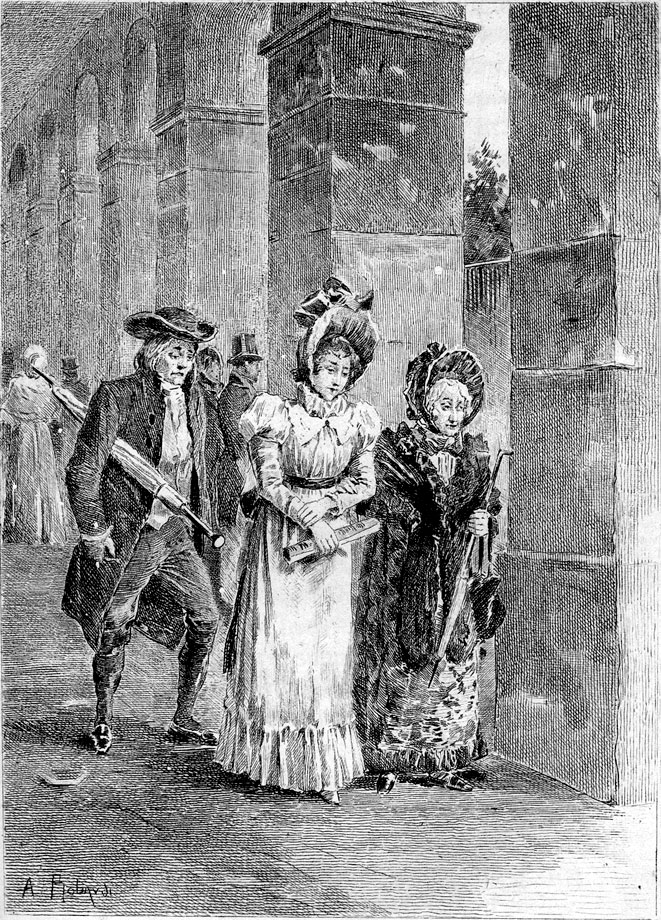
- Illustration by Alcide Théophile Robaudi.
- Country: France
- Language: French

Publication
- Publication date: 1837
- Series: La Comédie humaine

La Maison Nucingen (English "The House of Nucingen", also translated as “The Firm of Nucingen”) is a short story by Honoré de Balzac. It was published in 1837 and is one of the Scènes de la vie Parisienne of La Comédie humaine.

== Plot summary ==
The story is told in the first person by an anonymous narrator. In the private dining room of a famous Parisian restaurant, the narrator overhears the conversation of four journalists in the next room, Andoche Finot, Émile Blondet, Couture and Jean-Jacques Bixiou, all recurring characters in La Comédie humaine.

They comment and speculate about the wealth of Eugène de Rastignac who they remember was poor when he first arrived in Paris. Bixiou tells the others that Rastignac owes his wealth to his dealings with Maison Nucingen, the famous Parisian bank run by Baron de Nucingen. Rastignac is the lover of Nucingen's wife Delphine. Nucingen pretends to be ignorant of this, but also decides to use Rastignac. Nucingen thinks that "capital is a power only when you are very much richer than other people", which is why he embarks on complex operations which can be summed up as follows: he raises the prices of securities and buys them back after having them artificially lowered. He even goes so far as to use men well regarded in the Parisian sphere, of which Rastignac is a part, to believe in his imminent ruin and to fuel the panic which then allows him to speculate. Nucingen has the art of combining false bankruptcies, advancing his pawns in the form of straw men. He can then buy back at a very low price the stocks that he had initially sold at higher prices.

His first liquidation enabled him to acquire a luxury mansion and embark on an extravagant business in shares in the mines of Wortschin. He then juggled with a second, then a third liquidation. Nucingen used a large number of "straw men", among them Eugène de Rastignac, and the count of Lupeaulx, who all enriched themselves in the process. However some of Nucingen's other clients, the Aldriggers, and the Beaudenords are financially ruined.

== Themes ==
Frederick Lawton wrote of this story "The Firm of Nucingen is a scathing satire of the world of stock-jobbing, where the money of the small investor is robbed with impunity under cover of legality".

== Recurring Characters ==
Rastignac is also the main character of Père Goriot which also features the Nucingens, and includes the start of his affair with Delphine.

== Adaptation ==
The story was adapted into the French movie Nucingen House in 2008.
