= Père Goriot =

1835 novel by Honoré de Balzac

Father Goriot
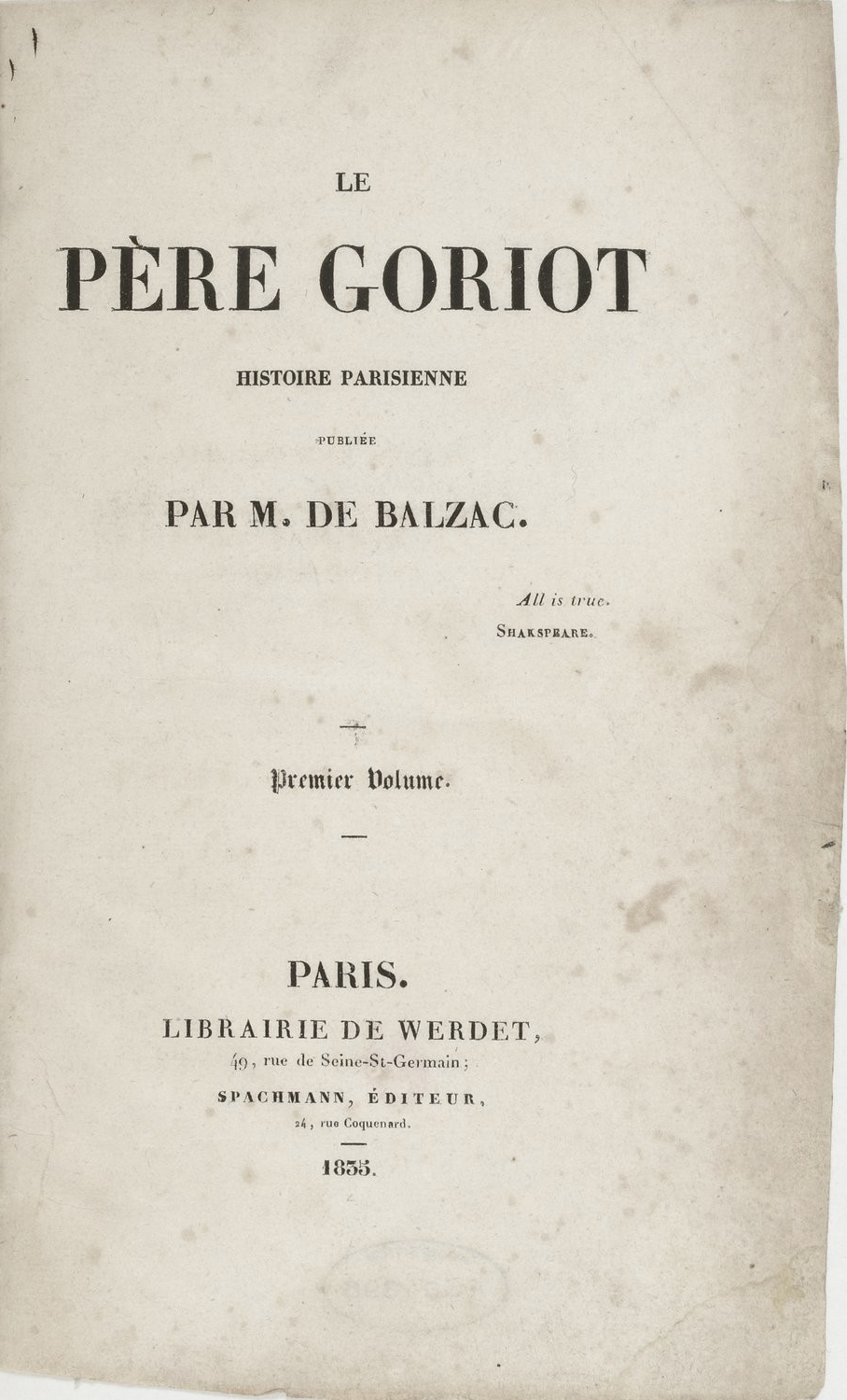
- Author: Honoré de Balzac
- Original title: Le Père Goriot
- Language: French
- Series: La Comédie humaine
- Set in: Paris, 1819
- Publisher: Revue de Paris
- Publication date: December 1834 – February 1835 (serialisation); March 1835 (bound)
- Publication place: France
- Media type: Serialisation in journal
- Dewey Decimal: 843.7
- Original text: Le Père Goriot at French Wikisource

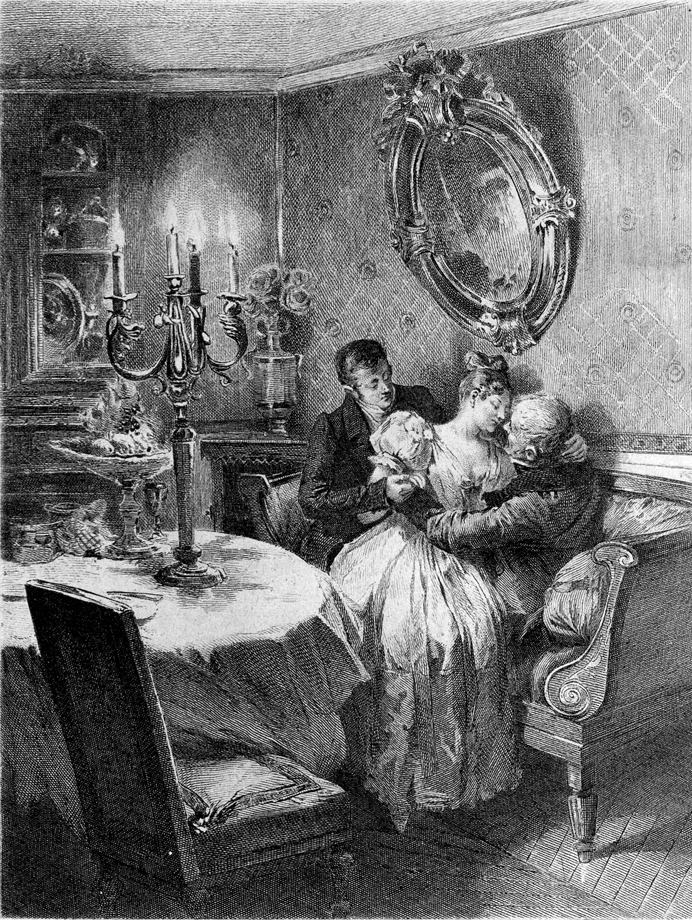
Title page engraving from an 1897 edition of Le Père Goriot, by an unknown artist; published by George Barrie & Son in Philadelphia

Le Père Goriot (Note: In some publications, the title is written simply as Père Goriot (including without the grave accent, as Pere Goriot) or Anglicized as Old Goriot.) (French pronunciation: [lə pɛʁ ɡɔʁjo], "Old Goriot" or "Father Goriot") is an 1835 novel by French novelist and playwright Honoré de Balzac (1799–1850), included in the Scènes de la vie privée section of his novel sequence La Comédie humaine. Set in Paris in 1819, it follows the intertwined lives of three characters: the elderly doting Goriot, a mysterious criminal-in-hiding named Vautrin and a naive law student named Eugène de Rastignac.

Originally published in serial form during the winter of 1834–1835, Le Père Goriot is widely considered Balzac's most important novel. It marks the first serious use by the author of characters who had appeared in other books, a technique that distinguishes Balzac's fiction. The novel is also noted as an example of his realist style, using minute details to create character and subtext.

The novel takes place during the Bourbon Restoration, which brought profound changes to French society; the struggle by individuals to secure a higher social status is a major theme in the book. The city of Paris also impresses itself on the characters – especially young Rastignac, who grew up in the provinces of southern France. Balzac analyzes, through Goriot and others, the nature of family and marriage, providing a pessimistic view of these institutions.

The novel was released to mixed reviews. Some critics praised the author for his complex characters and attention to detail; others condemned him for his many depictions of corruption and greed. A favorite of Balzac's, the book quickly won widespread popularity and has often been adapted for film and the stage. It gave rise to the French expression "Rastignac", a social climber willing to use any means to better his situation.

== Background ==
=== Historical background ===
The novel draws on several historical events that shook the French social order in short succession: the French Revolution, which led to the First Republic; Napoleon's rise, the fall and the return of the House of Bourbon. Le Père Goriot begins in June 1819, four years after Napoleon's defeat at Waterloo and the Bourbon Restoration. It depicts the mounting tension between the aristocracy, which had returned with Louis XVIII, and the bourgeoisie produced by the Industrial Revolution. In this period, France saw a tightening of social structures, with a lower class burdened with overwhelming poverty. By one estimate, almost three-quarters of Parisians did not make the 500–600 francs a year necessary for a minimal standard of living. At the same time, this upheaval made possible a social mobility unthinkable during the Ancien Régime. Individuals willing to adapt to the rules of this new society could sometimes ascend into its upper echelons from modest backgrounds, much to the distaste of the established wealthy class.

=== Literary background ===
When Balzac began writing Le Père Goriot in 1834, he had written several dozen books, including a stream of pseudonymously published potboiler novels. In 1829 he published Les Chouans, the first novel to which he signed his own name; this was followed by Louis Lambert (1832), Le Colonel Chabert (1832), and La Peau de chagrin (1831). Around this time, Balzac began organizing his work into a sequence of novels that he eventually called La Comédie humaine, divided into sections representing various aspects of life in France during the early 19th century.

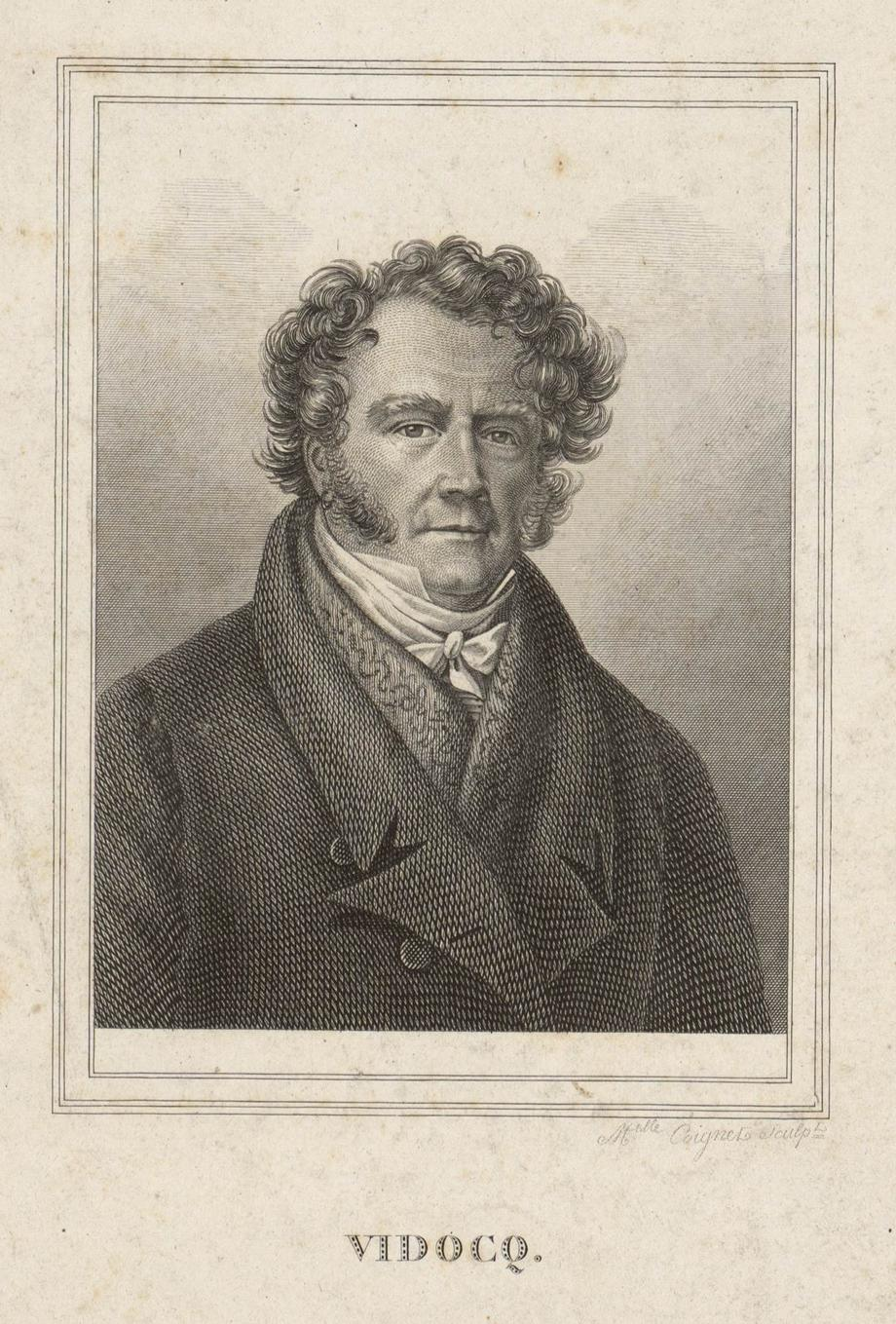
French criminal Eugène François Vidocq was the basis for the character Vautrin in Le Père Goriot.

One of these aspects which fascinated Balzac was the life of crime. In the winter of 1828–29, a French grifter-turned-policeman named Eugène François Vidocq published a pair of sensationalized memoirs recounting his criminal exploits. Balzac met Vidocq in April 1834, and used him as a model for a character named Vautrin he was planning for an upcoming novel.

== Writing and publication ==
In the summer of 1834 Balzac began to work on a tragic story about a father who is rejected by his daughters. His journal records several undated lines about the plot: "Subject of Old Goriot – A good man – middle-class lodging-house – 600 fr. income – having stripped himself bare for his daughters who both have 50,000 fr. income – dying like a dog." He wrote the first draft of Le Père Goriot in forty autumn days; it was published as a serial in the Revue de Paris between December and February. It was released as a stand-alone volume in March 1835 by Edmond Werdet, who also published the second edition in May. A revised third edition was published in 1839 by Charpentier. As was his custom, Balzac made copious notes and changes on proofs he received from publishers, so that the later editions of his novels were often significantly different from the earliest. In the case of Le Père Goriot, he changed a number of the characters into persons from other novels he had written, and added new passages.

In the first book edition, the novel was divided into seven chapters:

- In the first volume:
  - Une Pension bourgeoise (A Bourgeois Boarding House);
  - Les Deux Visites (The Two Visits);
  - L'Entrée dans le Monde (The Entrance into the World);
- In the second volume:
  - L'Entrée dans le Monde (Suite) [The Entrance into the World (Continuation)];
  - Trompe-la-Mort (Cheat-the-Death, Death-Dodger, or Dare-Devil);
  - Les Deux Filles (The Two Daughters);
  - La Mort du Père (The Father's Death).

The character Eugène de Rastignac had appeared as an old man in Balzac's earlier philosophical fantasy novel La Peau de chagrin. While writing the first draft of Le Père Goriot, Balzac named the character "Massiac", but he decided to use the same character from La Peau de chagrin. Other characters were changed in a similar fashion. It was his first structured use of recurring characters, a practice whose depth and rigor came to characterize his novels.

In 1843 Balzac placed Le Père Goriot in the section of La Comédie humaine entitled "Scènes de la vie parisienne" ("Scenes of life in Paris"). Quickly thereafter, he reclassified it – due to its intense focus on the private lives of its characters – as one of the "Scènes de la vie privée" ("Scenes of private life"). These categories and the novels in them were his attempt to create a body of work "depicting all society, sketching it in the immensity of its turmoil". Although he had prepared only a small predecessor for La Comédie humaine, entitled Études de Mœurs, at this time, Balzac carefully considered each work's place in the project and frequently rearranged its structure.

== Plot summary ==
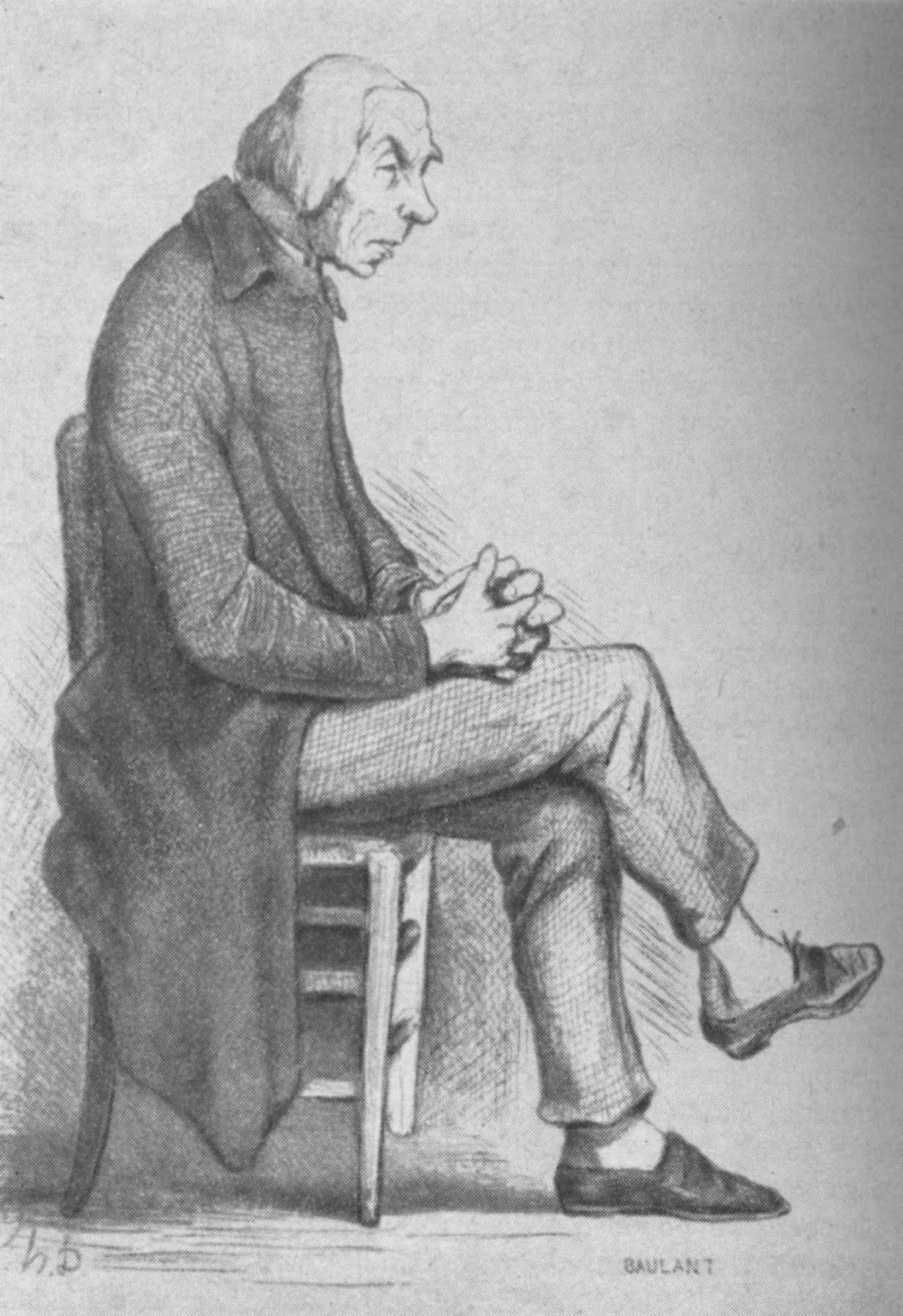
Father Goriot by Daumier (1842).

The novel opens with an extended description of the Maison Vauquer, a boarding house in Paris' rue Neuve-Sainte-Geneviève covered with vines, owned by the widow Madame Vauquer. The residents include the law student Eugène de Rastignac, a mysterious agitator named Vautrin, and an elderly retired vermicelli-maker named Jean-Joachim Goriot. The old man is ridiculed frequently by the other boarders, who soon learn that he has bankrupted himself to support his two well-married daughters.

Rastignac, who moved to Paris from the south of France, becomes attracted to the upper class. He has difficulty fitting in, but is tutored by his cousin, Madame de Beauséant, in the ways of high society. Rastignac endears himself to one of Goriot's daughters, Delphine, after extracting money from his own already-poor family. Vautrin, meanwhile, tries to convince Rastignac to pursue an unmarried woman named Victorine, whose family fortune is blocked only by her brother. He offers to clear the way for Rastignac by having the brother killed in a duel.

Rastignac refuses to go along with the plot, balking at the idea of having someone killed to acquire his wealth, but he takes note of Vautrin's machinations. This is a lesson in the harsh realities of high society. Before long, the boarders learn that police are seeking Vautrin, revealed to be a master criminal nicknamed Trompe-la-Mort (Daredevil, literally Cheat-the-Death or Death-Dodger). Vautrin arranges for a friend to kill Victorine's brother, in the meantime, and is captured by the police.

Goriot, supportive of Rastignac's interest in his daughter and furious with her husband's tyrannical control over her, finds himself unable to help. When his other daughter, Anastasie, informs him that she has been selling off her husband's family jewelry to pay her lover's debts, the old man is overcome with grief at his own impotence and suffers a stroke.

Delphine does not visit Goriot as he lies on his deathbed, and Anastasie arrives too late, only once he has lost consciousness. Before dying, Goriot rages about their disrespect toward him. His funeral is attended only by Rastignac, a servant named Christophe, and two paid mourners. Goriot's daughters, rather than being present at the funeral, send their empty coaches, each bearing their families' respective coat of arms. After the short ceremony, Rastignac turns to face Paris as the lights of evening begin to appear. He sets out to dine with Delphine, and declares to the city: "À nous deux, maintenant!" ("It's between you and me now!")

== Style ==
Balzac's style in Le Père Goriot is influenced by the American novelist James Fenimore Cooper and Scottish writer Walter Scott. In Cooper's representations of Native Americans, Balzac saw a human barbarism that survived through attempts at civilization. In a preface to the second edition in 1835, Balzac wrote that the title character Goriot – who made his fortune selling vermicelli during a time of widespread hunger – was an "Illinois of the flour trade" and a "Huron of the grain market". Vautrin refers to Paris as "a forest of the New World where twenty varieties of savage tribes clash" – another sign of Cooper's influence.

Scott was also a profound influence on Balzac, particularly in his use of real historical events as the backdrop for his novels. Although history is not central to Le Père Goriot, the post-Napoleonic era serves as an important setting, and Balzac's use of meticulous detail reflects the influence of Scott. In his 1842 introduction to La Comédie humaine, Balzac praises Scott as a "modern troubadour" who "vivified [literature] with the spirit of the past". At the same time, Balzac accused the Scottish writer of romanticizing history, and tried to distinguish his own work with a more balanced view of human nature.

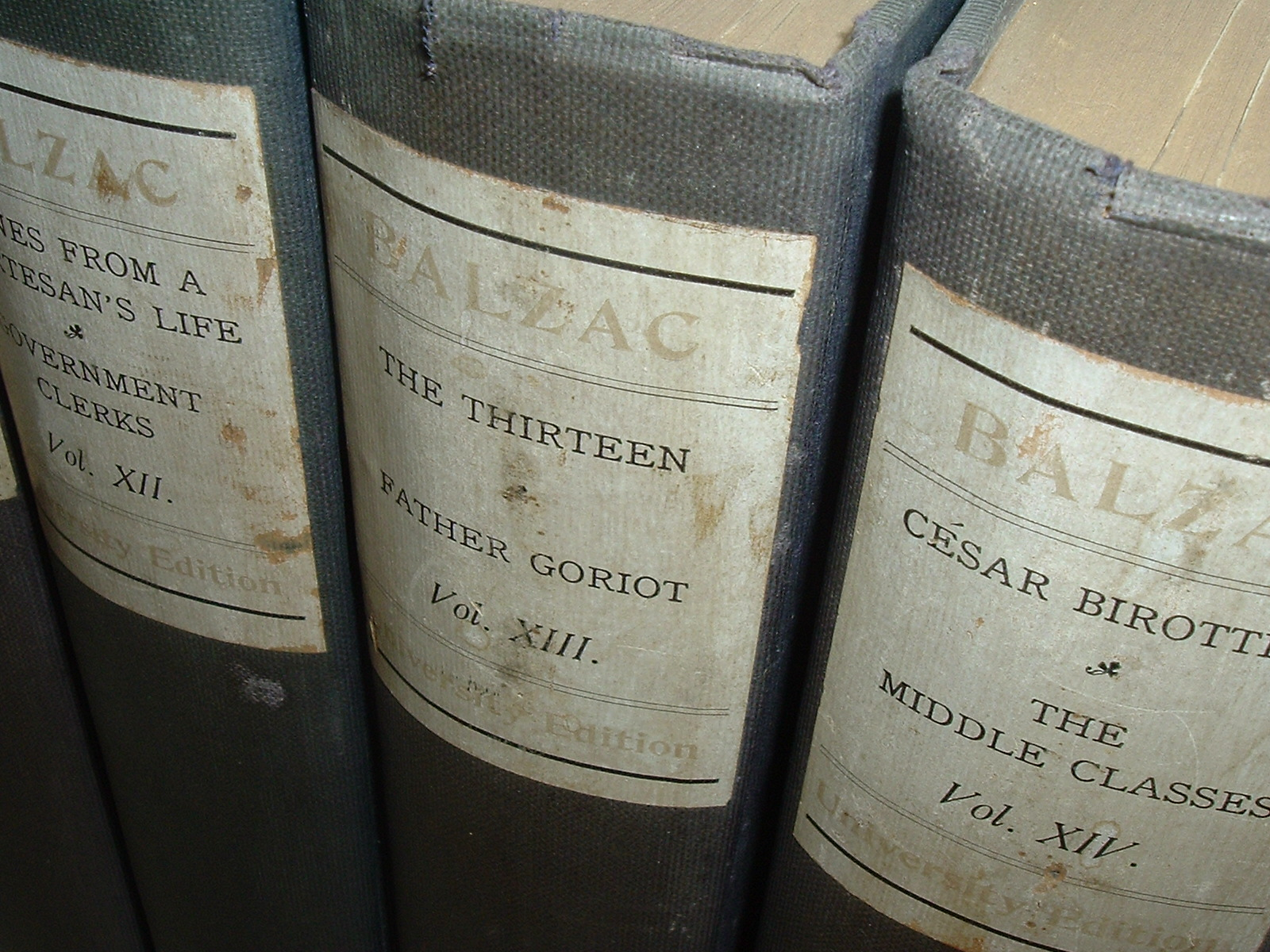
1901 edition of The Works of Honoré de Balzac, including Father Goriot

Although the novel is often referred to as "a mystery", it is not an example of whodunit or detective fiction. Instead, the central puzzles are the origins of suffering and the motivations of unusual behavior. Characters appear in fragments, with brief scenes providing small clues about their identity. Vautrin, for example, slips in and out of the story – offering advice to Rastignac, ridiculing Goriot, bribing the housekeeper Christophe to let him in after hours – before he is revealed as a master criminal. This pattern of people moving in and out of view mirrors Balzac's use of characters throughout La Comédie humaine.

Le Père Goriot is also recognized as a bildungsroman, wherein a naive young person matures while learning the ways of the world. Rastignac is tutored by Vautrin, Madame de Beauséant, Goriot, and others about the truth of Parisian society and the coldly dispassionate and brutally realistic strategies required for social success. As an everyman, he is initially repulsed by the gruesome realities beneath society's gilded surfaces; eventually, however, he embraces them. Setting aside his original goal of mastering the law, he pursues money and women as instruments for social climbing. In some ways this mirrors Balzac's own social education, reflecting the distaste he acquired for the law after studying it for three years.

=== Recurring characters ===
Le Père Goriot, especially in its revised form, marks an important early instance of Balzac's trademark use of recurring characters: persons from earlier novels appear in later works, usually during significantly different times of life. Pleased with the effect he achieved with the return of Rastignac, Balzac included 23 characters in the first edition of Le Père Goriot that would recur in later works; during his revisions for later editions the number increased to 48. Although Balzac had used this technique before, the characters had always reappeared in minor roles, as nearly identical versions of the same people. Rastignac's appearance shows, for the first time in Balzac's fiction, a novel-length backstory that illuminates and develops a returning character.

Balzac experimented with this method throughout the thirty years he worked on La Comédie humaine. It enabled a depth of characterization that went beyond simple narration or dialogue. "When the characters reappear", notes the critic Samuel Rogers, "they do not step out of nowhere; they emerge from the privacy of their own lives which, for an interval, we have not been allowed to see." Although the complexity of these characters' lives inevitably led Balzac to make errors of chronology and consistency, the mistakes are considered minor in the overall scope of the project. Readers are more often troubled by the sheer number of people in Balzac's world, and feel deprived of important context for the characters. Detective novelist Arthur Conan Doyle said that he never tried to read Balzac, because he "did not know where to begin".

This pattern of character reuse had repercussions for the plot of Le Père Goriot. Baron de Nucingen's reappearance in La Maison Nucingen (1837) reveals that his wife's love affair with Rastignac was planned and coordinated by the baron himself. This new detail sheds considerable light on the actions of all three characters within the pages of Le Père Goriot, complementing the evolution of their stories in the later novel.

=== Realism ===
Balzac uses meticulous, abundant detail to describe the Maison Vauquer, its inhabitants, and the world around them; this technique gave rise to his title as the father of the realist novel. The details focus mostly on the penury of the residents of the Maison Vauquer. Much less intricate are the descriptions of wealthier homes; Madame de Beauséant's rooms are given scant attention, and the Nucingen family lives in a house sketched in the briefest detail.

At the start of the novel, Balzac declares (in English): "All is true". Although the characters and situations are fictions, the details employed – and their reflection of the realities of life in Paris at the time – faithfully render the world of the Maison Vauquer. The rue Neuve-Sainte-Geneviève (where the house is located) presents "a grim look about the houses, a suggestion of a jail about those high garden walls". The interiors of the house are painstakingly described, from the shabby sitting room ("Nothing can be more depressing") to the coverings on the walls depicting a feast ("papers that a little suburban tavern would have disdained") – an ironic decoration in a house known for its wretched food. Balzac owed the former detail to the expertise of his friend Hyacinthe de Latouche, who was trained in the practice of hanging wallpaper. The house is even defined by its repulsive smell, unique to the poor boardinghouse.

== Themes ==
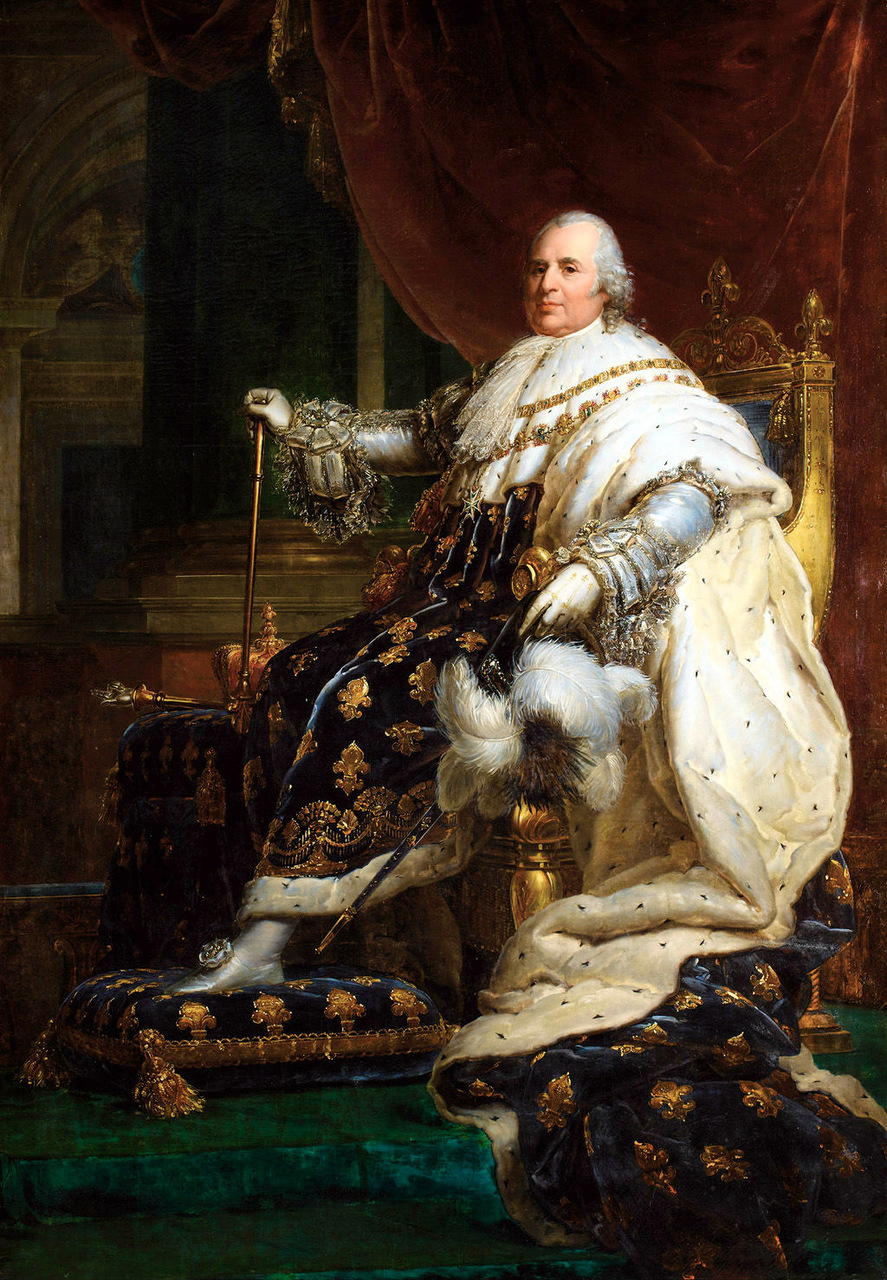
The Charter of 1814 granted by King Louis XVIII created a legal structure dominated by wealth and serves as the backdrop for Rastignac's maneuvers in Le Père Goriot.

=== Social stratification ===
One of the main themes in Le Père Goriot is the quest to understand and ascend society's strata. The Charter of 1814 granted by King Louis XVIII had established a "legal country" which allowed only a small group of the nation's most wealthy men to vote. Thus, Rastignac's drive to achieve social status is evidence not only of his personal ambition but also of his desire to participate in the body politic. As with Scott's characters, Rastignac epitomizes, in his words and actions, the Zeitgeist in which he lives.

Through his characters and narration, Balzac lays bare the social Darwinism of this society. In one particularly blunt speech, Madame de Beauséant tells Rastignac:

The more cold-blooded your calculations, the further you will go. Strike ruthlessly; you will be feared. Men and women for you must be nothing more than post-horses; take a fresh relay, and leave the last to drop by the roadside; in this way you will reach the goal of your ambition. You will be nothing here, you see, unless a woman interests herself in you; and she must be young and wealthy, and a woman of the world. Yet, if you have a heart, lock it carefully away like a treasure; do not let any one suspect it, or you will be lost; you would cease to be the executioner, you would take the victim's place. And if ever you should love, never let your secret escape you!

This attitude is further explored by Vautrin, who tells Rastignac: "The secret of a great success for which you are at a loss to account is a crime that has never been discovered, because it was properly executed." This sentence has been frequently – and somewhat inaccurately – paraphrased as: "Behind every great fortune is a great crime."

=== Influence of Paris ===
The novel's representations of social stratification are specific to Paris, perhaps the most densely populated city in Europe at the time. Traveling only a few blocks – as Rastignac does continually – takes the reader into vastly different worlds, distinguished by their architecture and reflecting the class of their inhabitants. Paris in the post-Napoleonic era was split into distinct neighborhoods. Three of these are featured prominently in Le Père Goriot: the aristocratic area of the Faubourg Saint-Germain, the newly upscale quarter of the rue de la Chaussée-d'Antin, and the run-down area on the eastern slope of the Montagne Sainte-Geneviève.

These quartiers of the city serve as microcosms which Rastignac seeks to master; Vautrin, meanwhile, operates in stealth, moving among them undetected. Rastignac, as the naive young man from the country, seeks in these worlds a new home. Paris offers him a chance to abandon his far-away family and remake himself in the city's ruthless image. His urban exodus is like that of many people who moved into the French capital, doubling its population between 1800 and 1830. The texture of the novel is thus inextricably linked to the city in which it is set; "Paris", explains critic Peter Brooks, "is the looming presence that gives the novel its particular tone".

It is said that in Le Père Goriot, Paris becomes a character in the same way the city did in The Hunchback of Notre Dame and London becomes in Charles Dickens' works. This is evident in Balzac's portrayal of the Parisian society as mercilessly stratified, corrupt, amoral, and money-obsessed. In addition, the protagonists living in its quarters were presented in perfect harmony with their environment.

=== Corruption ===
Rastignac, Vautrin, and Goriot represent individuals corrupted by their desires. In his thirst for advancement, Rastignac has been compared to Faust, with Vautrin as Mephistopheles. Critic Pierre Barbéris calls Vautrin's lecture to Rastignac "one of the great moments of the Comédie humaine, and no doubt of all world literature". France's social upheaval provides Vautrin with a playground for an ideology based solely on personal advancement; he encourages Rastignac to follow suit.

Still, it is the larger social structure that finally overwhelms Rastignac's soul – Vautrin merely explains the methods and causes. Although he rejects Vautrin's offer of murder, Rastignac succumbs to the principles of brutality upon which high society is built. By the end of the novel, he tells Bianchon: "I'm in Hell, and I have no choice but to stay there."

While Rastignac desires wealth and social status, Goriot longs only for the love of his daughters: a longing that borders on idolatry. Because he represents bourgeois wealth acquired through trade – and not aristocratic primitive accumulation – his daughters are happy to take his money, but will see him only in private. Even as he is dying in extreme poverty, at the end of the book, he sells his few remaining possessions to provide for his daughters so that they might look splendid at a ball.

=== Family relations ===
The relations between family members follow two patterns: the bonds of marriage serve mostly as Machiavellian means to financial ends, while the obligations of the older generation to the young take the form of sacrifice and deprivation. Delphine is trapped in a loveless marriage to Baron de Nucingen, a money-savvy banker. He is aware of her extramarital affairs, and uses them as a means to extort money from her. Anastasie, meanwhile, is married to the comte de Restaud, who cares less about the illegitimate children she has than the jewels she sells to provide for her lover – who is conning her in a scheme that Rastignac has heard was popular in Paris. This depiction of marriage as a tool of power reflects the harsh reality of the unstable social structures of the time.

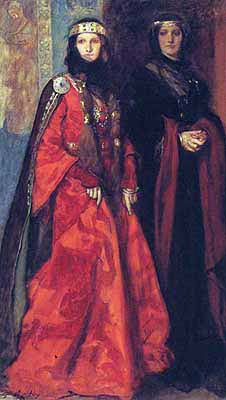
Balzac was accused of plagiarizing William Shakespeare's play King Lear, given the similarity of Goriot's daughters Anastasie and Delphine to Lear's children Goneril and Regan (depicted here in a 1902 painting by Edwin Austin Abbey).

Parents, meanwhile, give endlessly to their children; Goriot sacrifices everything for his daughters. Balzac refers to him in the novel as the "Christ of paternity" for his constant suffering on behalf of his children. That they abandon him, lost in their pursuit of social status, only adds to his misery. The end of the book contrasts Goriot's deathbed moments with a festive ball hosted by Madame de Beauséant – attended by his daughters, as well as Rastignac – suggesting a fundamental schism between society and the family.

The betrayal of Goriot's daughters is often compared to that of the characters in Shakespeare's King Lear; Balzac was even accused of plagiarism when the novel was first published. Discussing these similarities, critic George Saintsbury claims that Goriot's daughters are "as surely murderesses of their father as [Lear's daughters] Goneril and Regan". As Herbert J. Hunt points out in Balzac's Comédie humaine, however, Goriot's tale is in some ways more tragic, since "he has a Regan and a Goneril, but no Cordelia".

The narrative of Goriot's painful relations with his children has also been interpreted as a tragicomic parable of Louis XVI's decline. At a crucial moment of filial sentiment in Balzac's novel, Vautrin breaks in singing "O Richard, O mon roi"—the royalist anthem that precipitated the October Days of 1789 and the eventual downfall of Louis XVI—a connection that would have been powerful to Balzac's readers in the 1830s. An ill-founded faith in paternal legitimacy follows both Goriot and Louis XVI into the grave.

Rastignac's family, off-stage, also sacrifices extensively for him. Convinced that he cannot achieve a decent status in Paris without a considerable display of wealth, he writes to his family and asks them to send him money: "Sell some of your old jewelry, my kind mother; I will give you other jewels very soon." They do send him the money he requests, and – although it is not described directly in the novel – endure significant hardship for themselves as a result. His family, absent while he is in Paris, becomes even more distant despite this sacrifice. Although Goriot and Vautrin offer themselves as father figures to him, by the end of the novel they are gone and he is alone.

== Reception and legacy ==
Le Père Goriot is widely considered Balzac's essential novel. Its influence on French literature has been considerable, as shown by novelist Félicien Marceau's remark: "We are all children of Le Père Goriot." Brooks refers to its "perfection of form, its economy of means and ends". Martin Kanes, meanwhile, in his book Le Pére Goriot: Anatomy of a Troubled World, calls it "the keystone of the Comédie humaine". It is the central text of Anthony Pugh's voluminous study Balzac's Recurring Characters, and entire chapters have been written about the detail of the Maison Vauquer. Because it has become such an important novel for the study of French literature, Le Père Goriot has been translated many times into many languages. Thus, says Balzac biographer Graham Robb, "Goriot is one of the novels of La Comédie humaine that can safely be read in English for what it is."

Initial reviews of the book were mixed. Some reviewers accused Balzac of plagiarism or of overwhelming the reader with detail and painting a simplistic picture of Parisian high society. Others attacked the questionable morals of the characters, implying that Balzac was guilty of legitimizing their opinions. He was condemned for not including more individuals of honorable intent in the book. Balzac responded with disdain; in the second preface of 1835, he wrote with regard to Goriot: "Poor man! His daughters refused to recognize him because he had lost his fortune; now the critics have rejected him with the excuse that he was immoral."

Many critics of the time, though, were positive: a review in Le Journal des femmes proclaimed that Balzac's eye "penetrates everywhere, like a cunning serpent, to probe women's most intimate secrets". Another review, in La Revue du théâtre, praised his "admirable technique of details". The many reviews, positive and negative, were evidence of the book's popularity and success. One publisher's critique dismissed Balzac as a "boudoir writer", although it predicted for him "a brief career, but a glorious and enviable one".

Balzac himself was extremely proud of the work, declaring even before the final installment was published: "Le Père Goriot is a raging success; my fiercest enemies have had to bend the knee. I have triumphed over everything, over friends as well as the envious." As was his custom, he revised the novel between editions; compared to other novels, however, Le Père Goriot remained largely unchanged from its initial version.

According to the editor of the Norton Critical Edition, Peter Brooks, the book is now seen as "the most endurably popular of Balzac's myriad works" and a "classic of the 19th-century European novel", somewhat ironically in light of the reviews and Balzac's reputation in his own time.

In the years following its release, the novel was often adapted for the stage. Two theatrical productions in 1835 – several months after the book's publication – sustained its popularity and increased the public's regard for Balzac. In the 20th century, a number of film versions were produced, including adaptations directed by Travers Vale (1915), Jacques de Baroncelli (1922), and Paddy Russell (1968). The name of Rastignac, meanwhile, has become an iconic sobriquet in the French language; a "Rastignac" is synonymous with a person willing to climb the social ladder at any cost.

Another well known line of this book by Balzac is when Vautrin tells Eugene, "In that case I will make you an offer that no one would decline." This has been reworked by Mario Puzo in the novel The Godfather (1969) and its film adaptation (1972); "I'm gonna make him an offer he can't refuse". It was ranked as the second most significant cinematic quote in AFI's 100 Years...100 Movie Quotes (2005) by the American Film Institute.

== Bibliography ==
- Adamson, Donald: Old Goriot presented in Everyman Books, 1991.
- Auerbach, Erich. Père Goriot. New York: W. W. Norton & Company, 1998. ISBN 0-393-97166-X. pp. 279–289.
- Balzac, Honoré de. "Author's Introduction". La Comédie humaine. The Human Comedy: Introductions and Appendix. 1842. Online at Project Gutenberg. Retrieved on 19 January 2008.
- Balzac, Honoré de. Father Goriot. The Works of Honoré de Balzac. Vol. XIII. Philadelphia: Avil Publishing Company, 1901.
- Balzac, Honoré de. Père Goriot. New York: W. W. Norton & Company, 1998. ISBN 0-393-97166-X.
- Baran, J. H. "Predators and parasites in Le Père Goriot". Symposium. 47.1 (1993): 3–15. ISSN 0039-7709.
- Barbéris, Pierre. "The Discovery of Solitude". Père Goriot. New York: W. W. Norton & Company, 1998. ISBN 0-393-97166-X. pp. 304–314.
- Bellos, David. Honoré de Balzac: Old Goriot (Landmarks of World Literature). Cambridge: Cambridge University Press, 1987. ISBN 0-521-31634-0.
- Brooks, Peter. "Editor's Introduction". Père Goriot. New York: W. W. Norton & Company, 1998. ISBN 0-393-97166-X. pp. vii–xiii.
- Brooks, Peter. Realist Vision. New Haven: Yale University Press, 2005. ISBN 0-300-10680-7.
- Crawford, Marion Ayton. "Translator's Introduction". Old Goriot. Harmondsworth: Penguin Classics, 1951. ISBN 0-14-044017-8.
- Dedinsky, Brucia L. "Development of the Scheme of the Comédie humaine: Distribution of the Stories". The Evolution of Balzac's Comédie humaine. Ed. E. Preston Dargan and Bernard Weinberg. Chicago: University of Chicago Press, 1942. OCLC 905236.
- Douthwaite, Julia V. "The Once and Only Pitiful King," chapter 3 of The Frankenstein of 1790 and other Lost Chapters from Revolutionary France. Chicago: University of Chicago Press, 2012.
- Ginsberg, Michal Peled, ed. Approaches to Teaching Balzac's Old Goriot. New York: The Modern Language Association of America, 2000. ISBN 0-87352-760-7.
- Hunt, Herbert J. Balzac's Comédie Humaine. London: University of London Athlone Press, 1959. OCLC 4566561.
- Kanes, Martin. Père Goriot: Anatomy of a Troubled World. New York: Twayne Publishers, 1993. ISBN 0-8057-8363-6.
- McCarthy, Mary Susan. Balzac and His Reader: A Study in the Creation of Meaning in La Comédie humaine. Columbia: University of Missouri Press, 1982. ISBN 0-8262-0378-7.
- Mozet, Nicole. "Description and Deciphering: The Maison Vauquer". Père Goriot. New York: W. W. Norton & Company, 1998. ISBN 0-393-97166-X. pp. 338–353.
- Oliver, E. J. Balzac the European. London: Sheed and Ward, 1959. OCLC 4298277
- Petrey, Sandy. "The Father Loses a Name: Constative Identity in Le Père Goriot". Père Goriot. New York: W. W. Norton & Company, 1998. ISBN 0-393-97166-X. pp. 328–338.
- Pugh, Anthony R. Balzac's Recurring Characters. Toronto: University of Toronto Press, 1974. ISBN 0-8020-5275-4.
- Robb, Graham. Balzac: A Biography. New York: W. W. Norton & Company, 1994. ISBN 0-393-03679-0.
- Rogers, Samuel (1953). Balzac & The Novel. New York: Octagon Books. LCCN 75-76005.
- Saintsbury, George (1901). "Introduction". The Works of Honoré de Balzac. Vol. XIII. Philadelphia: Avil Publishing.
- Stowe, William W. Balzac, James, and the Realistic Novel. Princeton: Princeton University Press, 1983. ISBN 0-691-06567-5.
