= Les Secrets de la princesse de Cadignan =

Short story by Honoré de Balzac

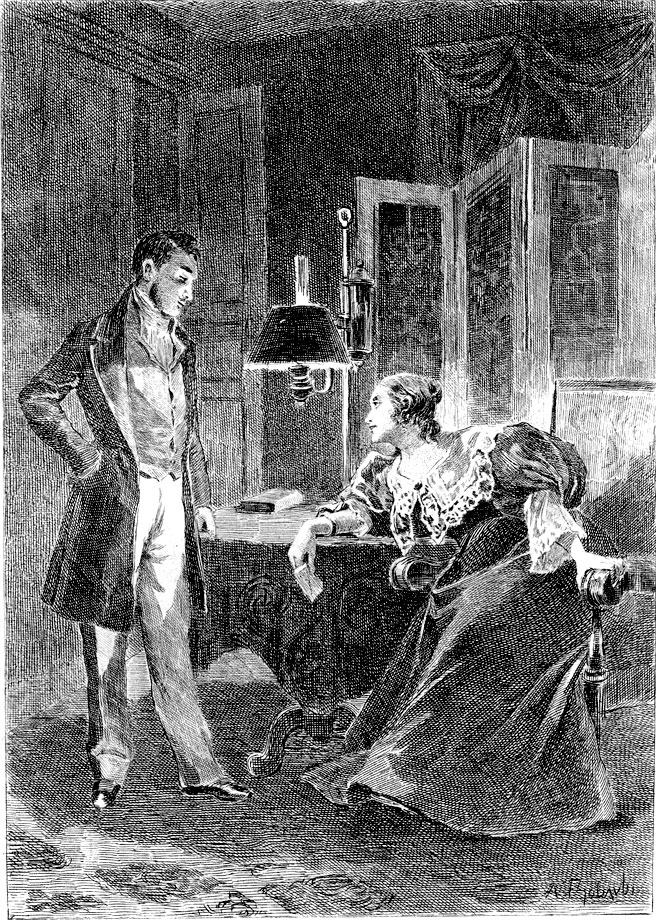
- Illustration by Alcide Théophile Robaudi
- Author: Honoré de Balzac
- Language: French
- Series: La Comédie humaine
- Publication date: 1839
- Publication place: France

Les Secrets de la princesse de Cadignan (English "The Secrets of the Princesse de Cadignan") is a short story by Honoré de Balzac. It was published in 1839 and is one of the Scènes de la vie Parisienne of La Comédie humaine.

The short story depicts a princess of Cadignan whose husband was exiled. After a number of extramarital affairs, the princess decides to seduce a conservative politician. She uses the pretext of conversing about a deceased mutual friend, and makes an effort to read the politician's books in order to have topics to discuss with him.

== Plot summary ==
Diane de Maufrigneuse, also known as the Princesse de Cadignan, is an aristocrat whose husband went into exile after the July Revolution in 1830 due to his loyalty to Charles X. She has had a number of love affairs which her husband has ignored. She was also loved by Michel Chrestien, who admired her from afar, usually attending the opera in order to see her. Chrestien, an ardent republican is killed in a republican uprising in 1832.

She wishes to meet and ensnare the esteemed writer and conservative politician, Daniel d'Arthez. Her pretext for meeting him is that he was a friend of Chrestien. They had been very close friends in spite of their different political opinions. In order to arrange this meeting, her friend Marquise d'Espard hosts a small dinner party and invites Diane, d'Arthez and some others. The Princesse and d'Arthez are seated next to each other, and speak about Chrestien. Afterwards, d'Arthez visits the Princesses' home every evening and falls in love with her. Diane hurriedly reads his books during the day in order to converse about them with d'Arthez in the evenings.

One evening Diane tells d'Arthez how high society has wronged her particularly by gossiping about her. Daniel falls more deeply in love with her. Then at her request he attends a party at Marquise d'Espard's home without her. There he hears some of the guests gossiping about Diane, particularly the ways in which she has used her former lovers. Daniel rebukes the others and speaks in defence of Diane.

Afterwards, Daniel and Diane become more committed in their love for each other. They spend more time together and d'Arthez spends less time on his writing.

The story is loosely based on the relationship between Dorothea Lieven and Francois Guizot.

== Reception and legacy ==
This story influenced works by other authors. It is analysed by a character in Marcel Proust's Sodome et Gomorrhe, and it also influenced the plot of Henry James's The American.

== Adaptation ==
1982: Les Secrets de la princesse de Cadignan, TV movie directed by Jacques Deray, with Claudine Auger in the role of the Princess of Cadignan; Marina Vlady: the Marquise d'Espard; François Marthouret: Daniel d'Arthez; Pierre Arditi: Émile Blondet; Niels Arestrup: Rastignac; Françoise Christophe: the Countess of Montcornet.

== Bibliography ==
- (in Italian) Loredana Bolzan, Segreti e bugie: Balzac sul cuore femminile, Rivista di Letterature Moderne e Comparate, January-March 2005, No. 58, vol. 1, p. 33-57.
- (in French) Jean-Loup Bourget, Balzac et le néo-classicisme: à propos des 'Secrets de la princesse de Cadignan' , Romanic Review, 1975, No. 66, p. 269-282.
- (in French) Tim Farrant, Le privé: espace menacé ? Des premières Scènes de la vie privée aux 'Secrets de la princesse de Cadignan' , L'Année balzacienne, 1994, No. 15, p. 121-138.
- Diana Festa-McCormick, Linguistic Deception in Balzac's 'Princesse de Cadignan' , Nineteenth-Century French Studies, spring-summer 1986, No. 14, vol. 3-4, p. 214-224.
- Alexander Fischler, Duplication and “Comédie morale” in Balzac's 'Les Secrets de la princesse de Cadignan' , Studies in Romanticism, summer 1985, No. 24, vol. 2, p. 257-266.
- (in French) Christelle Girard, Canonisation du roman, pensée du romanesque: Balzac, 'Les Secrets de la princesse de Cadignan' , Littérature, No. 173, March 2014, p. 35-54.
- Dominique Jullien, Of Stories and Women, SubStance, 1991, No. 20, vol. 2 (65), p. 77-88.
- (in French) Maryse Laffitte, 'Les Secrets de la princesse de Cadignan': féminité, vérité et roman, Revue romane, 1993, No. 28, vol. 2, p. 254-286.
- Thos. O. Mabbott, A Newly Found American Translation of Balzac, Modern Language Notes, April 1946, No. 61, vol. 4, p. 278-279.
- Angela S. Moger, Dressing and Undressing the Princess of Cadignan: Female Drapery/Narrative Striptease, Romanic Review, May 2004, No. 95, vol. 3, p. 315-325.
- Allan H. Pasco, Anti-Nous and Balzac's 'Princess de Cadignan' », Romance Quarterly, November 1987, No. 34, vol. 4, p. 425-433.
- (in French) Madeleine A. Simons, Le génie au féminin ou les paradoxes de 'La Princesse de Cadignan' , L'Année balzacienne, 1988, No. 9, p. 347-366.
