= La Peau de chagrin =

1831 novel by Honoré de Balzac

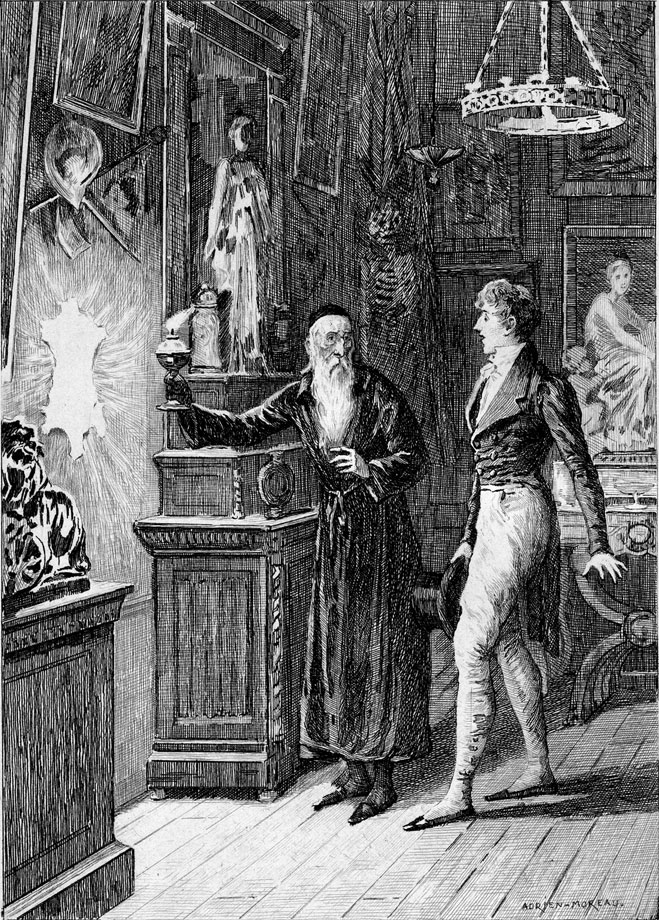
- 1897 illustration of La Peau de chagrin
- Author: Honoré de Balzac
- Language: French
- Series: La Comédie humaine
- Publication date: 1831
- Publication place: France

La Peau de chagrin (French pronunciation: [la po də ʃaɡʁɛ̃], The Skin of Shagreen), known in English as The Magic Skin and The Wild Ass's Skin, is an 1831 novel by French novelist and playwright Honoré de Balzac (1799–1850). Set in early 19th-century Paris, it tells the story of a young man who finds a magic piece of shagreen (untanned skin from a wild ass) that fulfills his every desire. For each wish granted, however, the skin shrinks and consumes a portion of his physical energy. La Peau de chagrin belongs to the Études philosophiques group of Balzac's sequence of novels, La Comédie humaine.

Before the book was completed, Balzac created excitement about it by publishing a series of articles and story fragments in several Parisian journals. Although he was five months late in delivering the manuscript, he succeeded in generating sufficient interest that the novel sold out instantly upon its publication. A second edition, which included a series of twelve other "philosophical tales", was released one month later.

Although the novel uses fantastic elements, its main focus is a realistic portrayal of the excesses of bourgeois materialism. Balzac's renowned attention to detail is used to describe a gambling house, an antique shop, a royal banquet, and other locales. He also includes details from his own life as a struggling writer, placing the main character in a home similar to the one he occupied at the start of his literary career. The central theme of La Peau de chagrin is the conflict between desire and longevity. The magic skin represents the owner's life-force, which is depleted through every expression of will, especially when it is employed for the acquisition of power. Ignoring a caution from the shopkeeper who offers him the skin, the protagonist greedily surrounds himself with wealth, only to find himself miserable and decrepit at the story's end.

La Peau de chagrin firmly established Balzac as a writer of significance in France. His social circle widened significantly, and he was sought eagerly by publishers for future projects. The book served as the catalyst for a series of letters he exchanged with a Polish baroness named Ewelina Hańska, who later became his wife. It also inspired Giselher Klebe's opera Die tödlichen Wünsche.

== Background ==
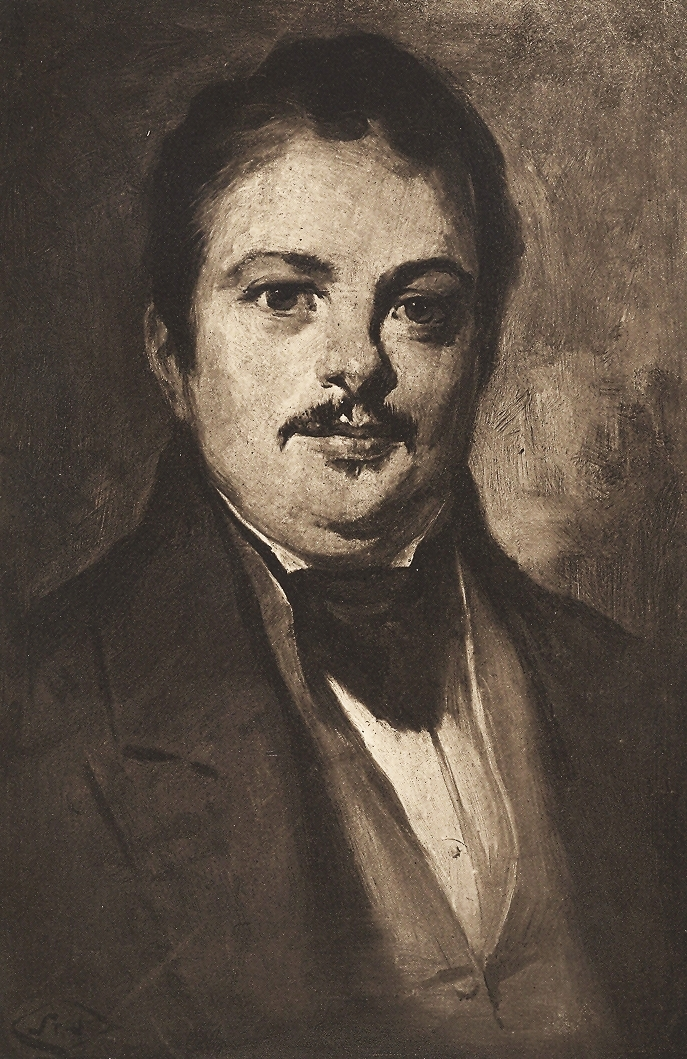
Honoré de Balzac spent ten years failing as an author before he wrote La Peau de chagrin.

In 1830 Honoré de Balzac had only begun to achieve recognition as a writer. Although his parents had persuaded him to make his profession the law, he announced in 1819 that he wanted to become an author. His mother was distraught, but she and his father agreed to give him a small income, on the condition that he dedicate himself to writing, and deliver to them half of his gross income from any published work. After moving into a tiny room near the Bibliothèque de l'Arsenal in Paris, Balzac wrote for one year, without success. Frustrated, he moved back to his family in the suburb of Villeparisis and borrowed money from his parents to pursue his literary ambitions further. He spent the next several years writing simple potboiler novels, which he published under a variety of pseudonyms. He shared some of his income from these with his parents, but by 1828 he still owed them 50,000 francs.

He published for the first time under his own name in 1829. Les Chouans, a novel about royalist forces in Brittany, did not succeed commercially, but it made Balzac known in literary circles. He achieved a major success later the same year when he published La Physiologie du mariage, a treatise on the institution of marriage. Bolstered by its popularity, he added to his fame by publishing a variety of short stories and essays in the magazines Revue de Paris, La Caricature, and La Mode. He thus made connections in the publishing industry that later helped him to obtain reviews of his novels.

At the time, French literary appetites for fantastic stories had been whetted by the 1829 translation of German writer E. T. A. Hoffmann's collection Fantastic Tales; the gothic fiction of England's Ann Radcliffe; and French author Jules Janin's 1829 novel L'Âne Mort et la Femme Guillotinée (The Dead Donkey and the Guillotined Woman). Although he planned a novel in the same tradition, Balzac disliked the term "fantastic", referring to it once as "the vulgar program of a genre in its first flush of newness, to be sure, but already too much worn by the mere abuse of the word".

The politics and culture of France, meanwhile, were in upheaval. After reigning for six controversial years, King Charles X was forced to abdicate during the July Revolution of 1830. He was replaced by Louis-Philippe, who named himself "King of the French" (rather than the usual "King of France") in an attempt to distance himself from the Ancien Régime. The July Monarchy brought an entrenchment of bourgeois attitudes, in which Balzac saw disorganization and weak leadership.

== Writing and publication ==
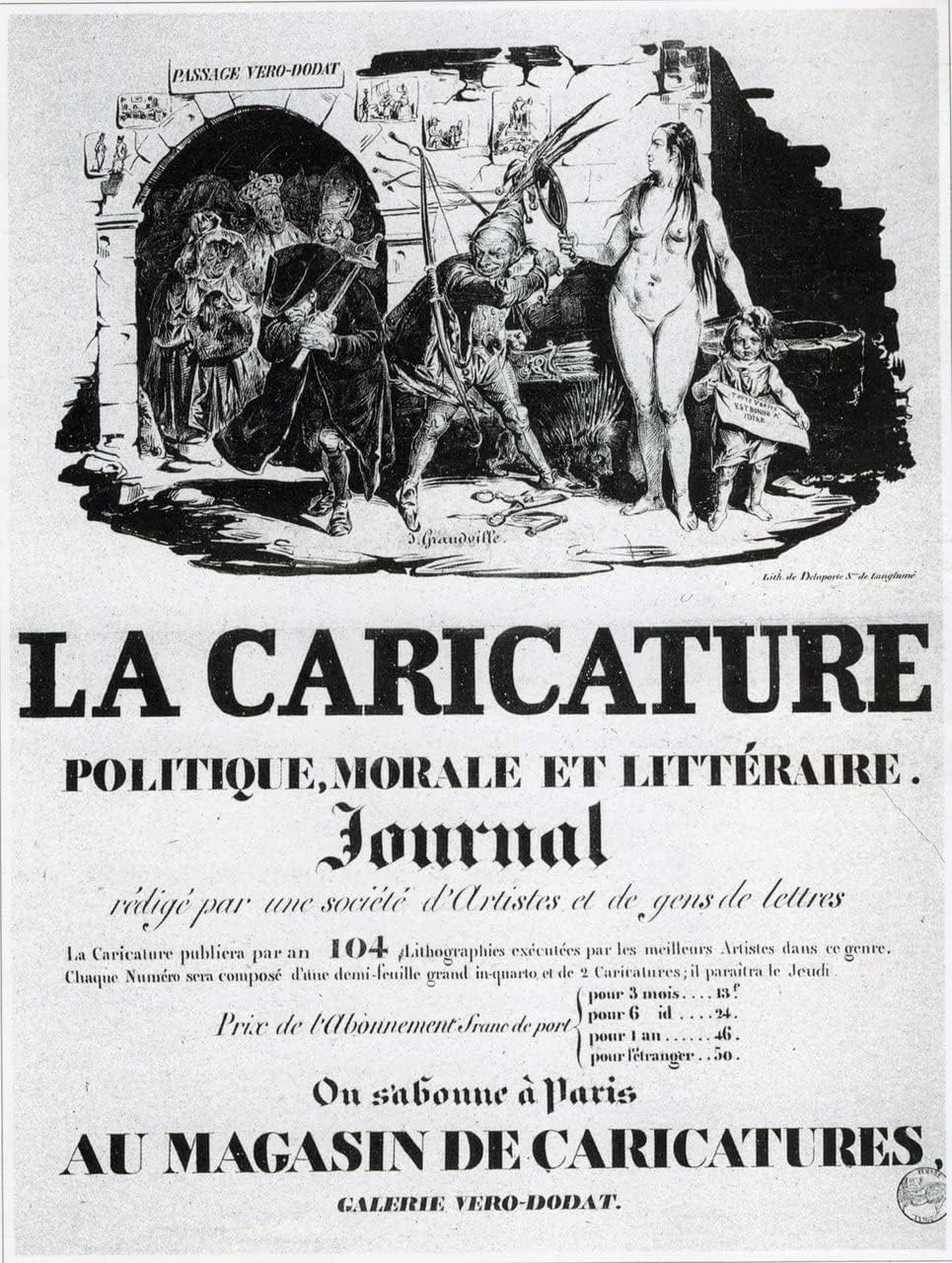
Balzac publicized the novel he was writing in the Parisian journal La Caricature.

The title La Peau de chagrin first appeared in print on 9 December 1830, as a passing mention in an article Balzac wrote for La Caricature under the pseudonym Alfred Coudreux. His scrapbook includes the following note, probably written at the same time: "L'invention d'une peau qui représente la vie. Conte oriental." ("The invention of a skin that represents life. Oriental story.") One week later, he published a story fragment called "Le Dernier Napoléon" in La Caricature, under the name "Henri B...". In it, a young man loses his last Napoleon coin at a Parisian gambling house, then continues to the Pont Royal to drown himself. During this early stage, Balzac did not think much of the project. He referred to it as "a piece of thorough nonsense in the literary sense, but in which [the author] has sought to introduce certain of the situations in this hard life through which men of genius have passed before achieving anything". Before long, though, his opinion of the story improved.

By January 1831 Balzac had generated enough interest in his idea to secure a contract with publishers Charles Gosselin and Urbain Canel. They agreed on 750 copies of an octavo edition, with a fee of 1,125 francs paid to the author upon receipt of the manuscript – by mid-February. Balzac delivered the novel in July.

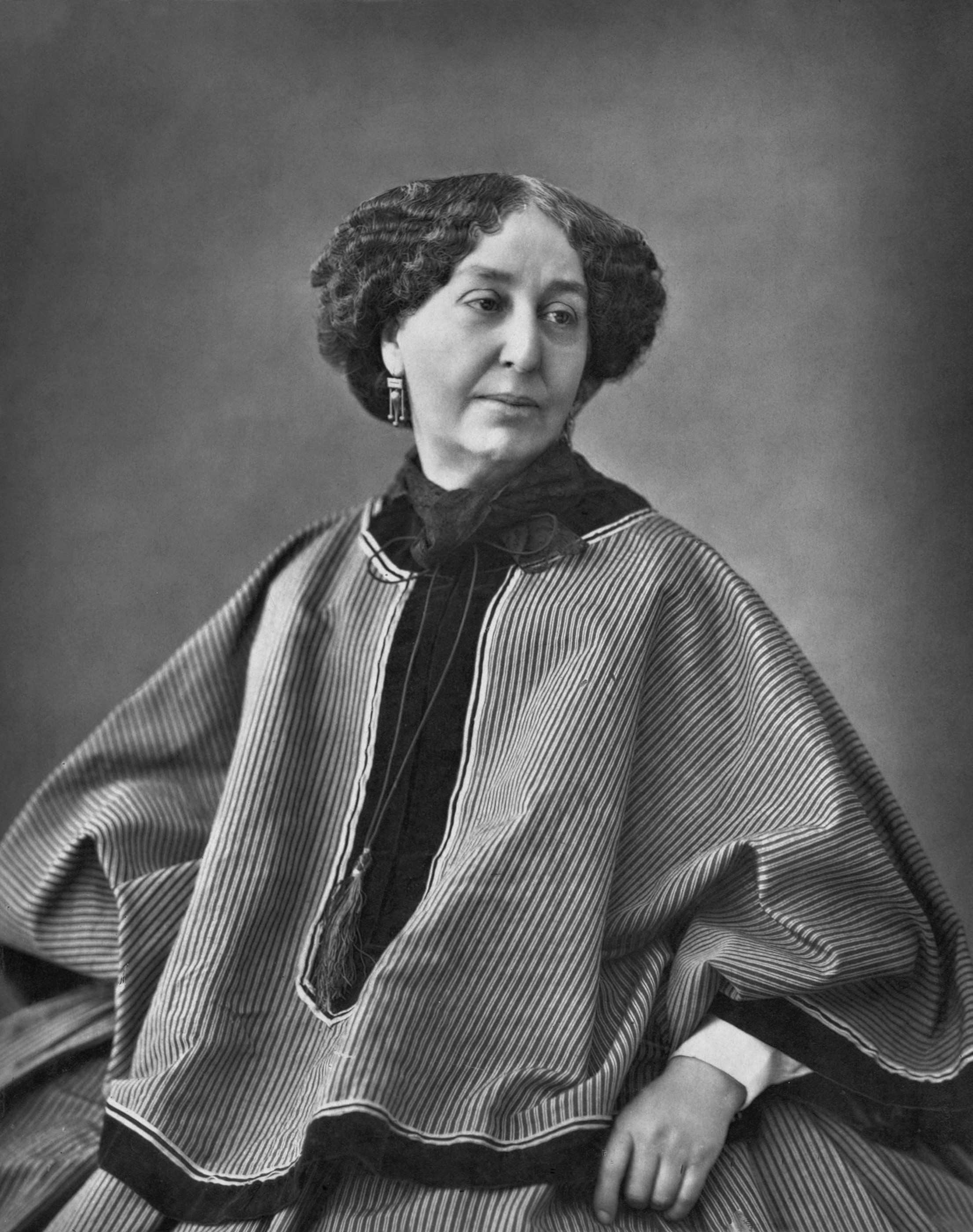
Balzac's friend George Sand was among the first to read the manuscript as it neared completion.

During the intervening months, however, he provided glimpses of his erratic progress. Two additional fragments appeared in May, part of a scheme to promote the book before its publication. "Une Débauche", published in the Revue des deux mondes, describes an orgiastic feast that features constant bantering and discussion from its bourgeois participants. The other fragment, "Le Suicide d'un poète", was printed in the Revue de Paris; it concerns the difficulties of a would-be poet as he tries to compensate for his lack of funds. Although the three fragments were not connected into a coherent narrative, Balzac was excerpting characters and scenes from his novel-in-progress.

The novel's delayed publication was a result of Balzac's active social life. He spent many nights dining at the homes of friends, including novelist Eugène Sue and his mistress Olympe Pélissier, as well as the feminist writer George Sand and her lover Jules Sandeau. Balzac and Pélissier had a brief affair, and she became the first lover with whom he appeared in public. Eventually he removed himself from Paris by staying with friends in the suburbs, where he committed himself to finishing the work. In late spring he allowed Sand to read a nearly-finished manuscript; she enjoyed it and predicted it would do well.

Finally, in August 1831, La Peau de chagrin: Conte philosophique was published in two volumes. It was a commercial success, and Balzac used his connections in the world of Parisian periodicals to have it reviewed widely. The book sold quickly, and by the end of the month another contract had been signed: Balzac would receive 4,000 francs to publish 1,200 additional copies. This second edition included a series of twelve other stories with fantastic elements, and was released under the title Romans et contes philosophiques (Philosophical Novels and Stories). A third edition, rearranged to fill four volumes, appeared in March 1833.

== Synopsis ==
La Peau de chagrin consists of three sections: "Le Talisman" ("The Talisman"), "La Femme sans cœur" ("The Woman without a Heart"), and "L'Agonie" ("The Agony"). The first edition contained a "Preface" and a "Moralité", which were excised from subsequent versions. A two-page Epilogue appears at the end of the final section.

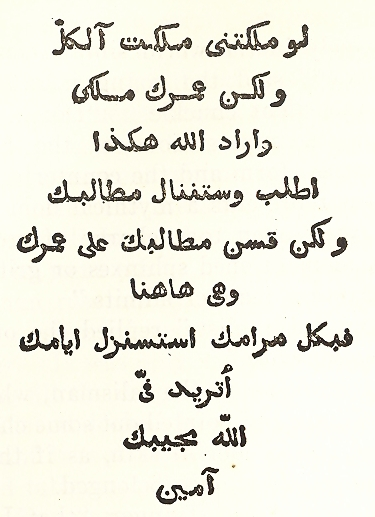
Arabic writing engraved into the shagreen promises that the owner "shal[l] possess all things".

"Le Talisman" begins with the plot of "Le Dernier Napoléon": A young man named Raphaël de Valentin wagers his last coin and loses, then proceeds to the river Seine to drown himself. On the way, however, he decides to enter an unusual shop and finds it filled with curiosities from around the world. The elderly shopkeeper leads him to a piece of shagreen hanging on the wall. It is inscribed with "Oriental" writing; the old man calls it "Sanskrit", but it is imprecise Arabic. The skin promises to fulfill any wish of its owner, shrinking slightly upon the fulfillment of each desire. The shopkeeper is willing to let Valentin take it without charge, but urges him not to accept the offer. Valentin waves away the shopkeeper's warnings and takes the skin, wishing for a royal banquet, filled with wine, women, and friends. He is immediately met by acquaintances who invite him to such an event; they spend hours eating, drinking, and talking.

Part two, "La Femme sans cœur", is narrated as a flashback from Valentin's point of view. He complains to his friend Émile about his early days as a scholar, living in poverty with an elderly landlord and her daughter Pauline, while trying fruitlessly to win the heart of a beautiful but aloof woman named Foedora. Along the way he is tutored by an older man named Eugène de Rastignac, who encourages him to immerse himself in the world of high society. Benefiting from the kindness of his landladies, Valentin maneuvers his way into Foedora's circle of friends. Unable to win her affection, however, he becomes the miserable and destitute man found at the start of "Le Talisman".

"L'Agonie" begins several years after the feast of parts one and two. Valentin, having used the talisman to secure a large income, finds both the skin and his health dwindling. He tries to break the curse by getting rid of the skin, but fails. The situation causes him to panic, horrified that further desires will hasten the end of his life. He organizes his home to avoid the possibility of wishing for anything: his servant, Jonathan, arranges food, clothing, and visitors with precise regularity. Events beyond his control cause him to wish for various things, however, and the skin continues to recede. Desperate, the sickly Valentin tries to find some way of stretching the skin, and takes a trip to the spa town of Aix-les-Bains in the hope of recovering his vitality.

With the skin no larger than a periwinkle leaf, he is visited by Pauline in his room; she expresses her love for him. When she learns the truth about the shagreen and her role in Raphaël's demise, she is horrified. Raphaël cannot control his desire for her and she rushes into an adjoining room to escape him and so save his life. He pounds on the door and declares both his love and his desire to die in her arms. She, meanwhile, is trying to kill herself to free him from his desire. He breaks down the door, they consummate their love in a fiery moment of passion, and he dies.

== Style ==
Although he preferred the term "philosophical", Balzac's novel is based upon a fantastic premise. The skin grants a world of possibility to Valentin, and he uses it to satisfy many desires. Pressured into a duel, for example, he explains how he need neither avoid his opponent's gunshot nor aim his own weapon; the outcome is inevitable. He fires without care, and kills the other man instantly. Elsewhere, the supernatural qualities of the skin are demonstrated when it resists the efforts of a chemist and a physicist to stretch it.

This inclusion of the fantastic, however, is mostly a framework by which the author discusses human nature and society. One critic suggests that "the story would be much the same without it". Balzac had used supernatural elements in the potboiler novels he published under noms de plume, but their presence in Peau de chagrin signaled a turning point in his approach to the use of symbolism. Whereas he had used fantastic objects and events in earlier works, they were mostly simple plot points or uncomplicated devices for suspense. With La Peau de chagrin, on the other hand, the talisman represents Valentin's soul; at the same time, his demise is symbolic of a greater social decline. Balzac's real foci in the 1831 novel are the power of human desire and the nature of society after the July Revolution. French writer and critic Félicien Marceau even suggests that the symbolism in the novel allows a purer analysis than the individual case studies of other Balzac novels; by removing the analysis to an abstract level, it becomes less complicated by variations of individual personality. As an everyman, Valentin displays the essential characteristics of human nature, not a particular person's approach to the dilemma offered by the skin.

In his Preface to the novel's first edition, Balzac meditates on the usefulness of fantastic elements: "[Writers] invent the true, by analogy, or they see the object to be described, whether the object comes to them or they go toward the object ... Have men the power to bring the universe into their brain, or is their brain a talisman with which they abolish the laws of time and space?" Critics agree that Balzac's goal in La Peau de chagrin was the former.

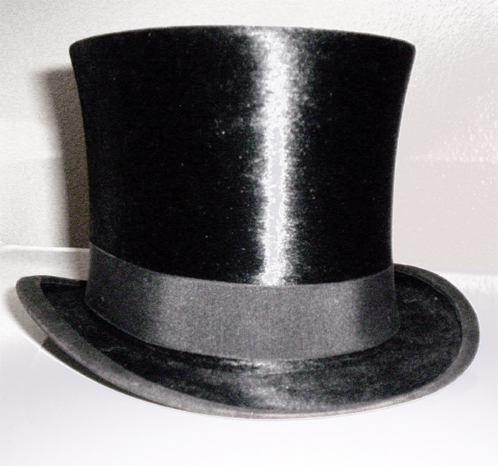
Extensive details about men's hats appear at the start of the novel, part of Balzac's realist approach to storytelling.

=== Realism ===
The novel is widely cited as an important early example of the realism for which Balzac became famous. Descriptions of Paris are one example: the novel is filled with actual locations, including the Palais Royal and the Notre-Dame de Paris cathedral. The narration and characters allude repeatedly to art and culture, from Gioachino Rossini's opera Tancredi to the statue of Venus de Milo.

The book's third paragraph contains a long description of the process and purpose behind the ritual in gambling houses whereby "the law despoils you of your hat at the outset." The atmosphere of the establishment is described in precise detail, from the faces of the players to the "greasy" wallpaper and the tablecloth "worn by the friction of gold". The emphasis on money evoked in the first pages – and its contrast with the decrepit surroundings – mirrors the novel's themes of social organization and economic materialism.

The confluence of realist detail with symbolic meaning continues when Valentin enters the antique shop; the store represents the planet itself. As he wanders about, he tours the world through the relics of its various epochs: "Every land of earth seemed to have contributed some stray fragment of its learning, some example of its art." The shop contains a painting of Napoleon; a Moorish yataghan; an idol of the Tartars; portraits of Dutch burgomasters; a bust of Cicero; an Ancient Egyptian mummy; an Etruscan vase; a Chinese dragon; and hundreds of other objects. The panorama of human activity reaches a moral fork in the road when the shopkeeper leads Valentin to Raphael's portrait of Jesus Christ. It does not deter him from his goal, however; only when he finds the skin does Valentin decide to abort his suicidal mission. In doing so, he demonstrates humanity favoring ego over divine salvation.

=== Opening image ===
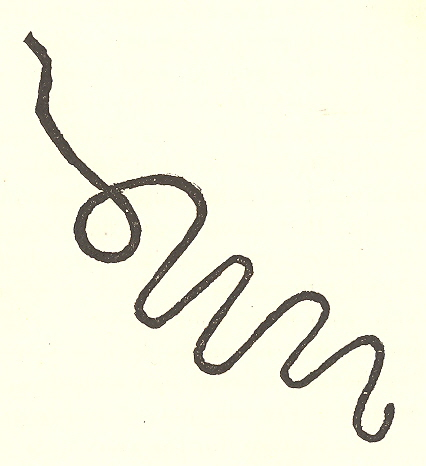
The curvy line from Volume IX, Chapter IV of Laurence Sterne's 1759 novel Tristram Shandy is reprinted at the start of Balzac's novel.

At the start of the novel, Balzac includes an image from Laurence Sterne's 1759 novel Tristram Shandy: a curvy line drawn in the air by a character seeking to express the freedom enjoyed "whilst a man is free". Balzac never explained his purpose behind the use of the symbol, and its significance to La Peau de chagrin is the subject of debate. In his comprehensive review of La Comédie humaine, Herbert J. Hunt connects the "serpentine squiggle" to the "sinuous design" of Balzac's novel. Critic Martin Kanes, however, suggests that the image symbolizes the impossibility of language to express an idea fully. This dilemma, he proposes, is directly related to the conflict between will and knowledge indicated by the shopkeeper at the start of the novel.

== Themes ==
=== Autobiography ===
Balzac mined his own life for details in the first parts of La Peau de Chagrin, and he likely modeled the protagonist Raphaël de Valentin on himself. Details recounted by Valentin of his impoverished living quarters are autobiographical allusions to Balzac's earliest days as an author: "Nothing could be uglier than this garret, awaiting its scholar, with its dingy yellow walls and odor of poverty. The roofing fell in a steep slope, and the sky was visible through chinks in the tiles. There was room for a bed, a table, and a few chairs, and beneath the highest point of the roof my piano could stand." Although they allow for a degree of embellishment, biographers and critics agree that Balzac was drawing from his own experience.

Other parts of the story also derive from the author's life: Balzac once attended a feast held by the Marquis de Las Marismas, who planned to launch a newspaper – the same situation in which Valentin finds himself after expressing his first wish to the talisman. Later, Valentin visits the opera armed with a powerful set of glasses that allow him to observe every flaw in the women on stage (to guard against desire). These may also have been drawn from Balzac's experience, as he once wrote in a letter about a set of "divine" opera glasses he ordered from the Paris Observatory.

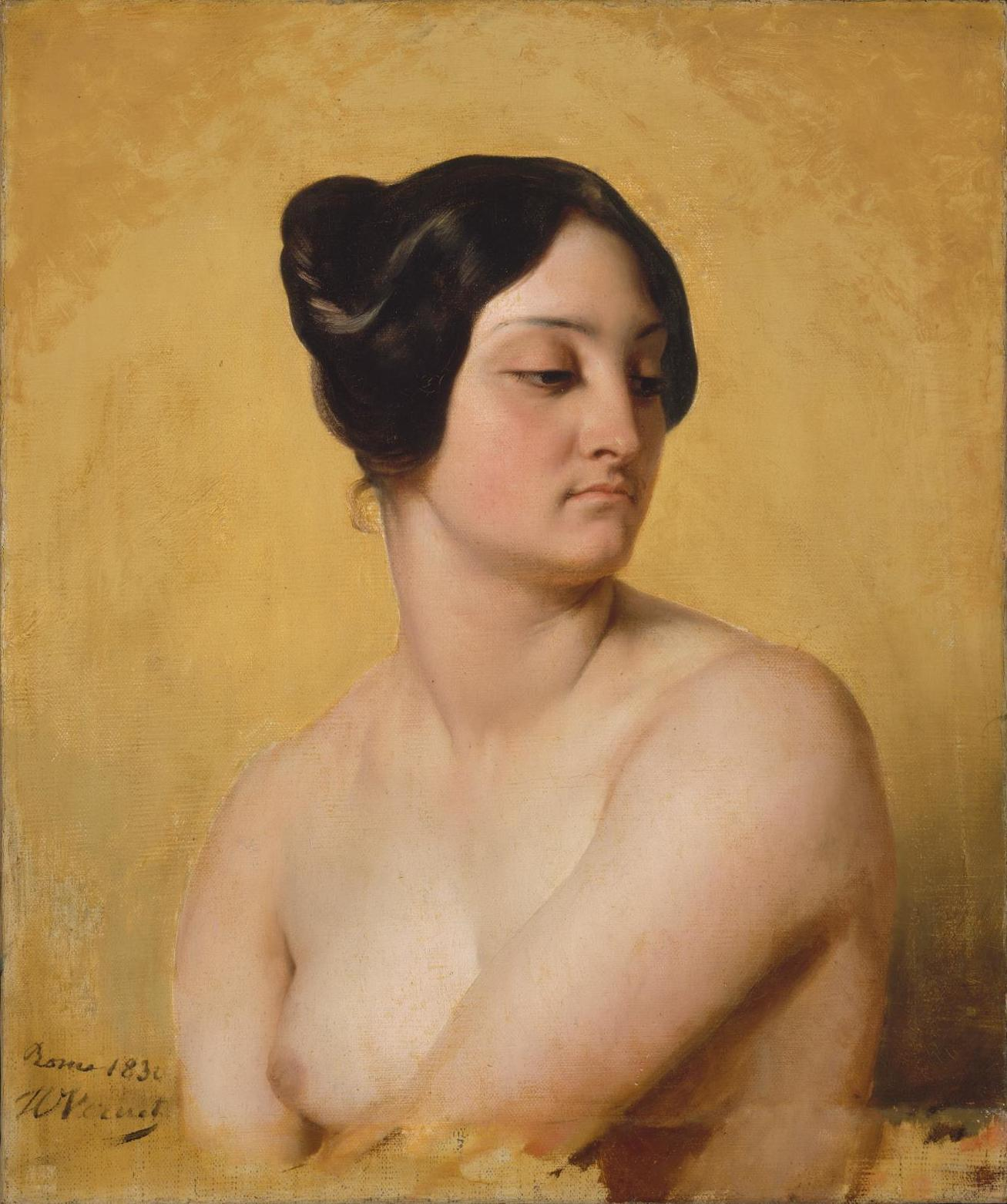
Similarities exist between Olympe Pélissier and the novel's "Woman without a Heart", but critics and biographers agree that the character is a composite of women from Balzac's life.

More significant is the connection between the women in the novel and the women in Balzac's life. Some critics have noted important similarities between Valentin's efforts to win the heart of Foedora and Balzac's infatuation with Olympe Pélissier. A scene in which Valentin hides in Foedora's bedroom to watch her undress is said to come from a similar situation wherein Balzac secretly observed Pélissier. It's probable that Pélissier was not the model for Foedora, however, since she accepted Balzac's advances and wrote him friendly letters; Foedora, by contrast, declares herself outside the reach of any interested lover. Critics agree that the "Woman without a Heart" described in the novel is a composite of other women Balzac knew. The character of Pauline, meanwhile, was likely influenced by another of Balzac's mistresses, Laure de Berny.

=== Vouloir, pouvoir, and savoir ===
At the start of the book, the shopkeeper discusses with Valentin "the great secret of human life". They consist of three words, which Balzac renders in capital letters: VOULOIR ("to will"), POUVOIR ("to be able"), and SAVOIR ("to know"). Will, he explains, consumes us; power (or, in one translation, "to have your will") destroys us; and knowledge soothes us. These three concepts form the philosophical foundation of the novel.

The talisman connects these precepts to the theory of vitalism; it physically represents the life force of its owner, and is reduced with each exercise of the will. The shopkeeper tries to warn Valentin that the wisest path lies not in exercising his will or securing power, but in developing the mind. "What is folly", he asks Valentin, "if not an excess of will and power?" Overcome with the possibilities offered by the skin, however, the young man throws caution to the wind and embraces his desire. Upon grabbing the talisman, he declares: "I want to live with excess." Only when his life force is nearly depleted does he recognize his mistake: "It suddenly struck him that the possession of power, no matter how enormous, did not bring with it the knowledge of how to use it ... [he] had had everything in his power, and he had done nothing."

The will, Balzac cautions, is a destructive force that seeks only to acquire power unless tempered by knowledge. The shopkeeper presents a foil for Valentin's future self, offering study and mental development as an alternative to consuming desire. Foedora also serves as a model for resistance to the corruption of will, insofar as she seeks at all times to excite desire in others while never giving in to her own. That Valentin is happiest living in the material squalor of his tiny garret – lost in study and writing, with the good-hearted Pauline giving herself to him – underscores the irony of his misery at the end of the book, when he is surrounded with the fruits of his material desire.

=== Society ===
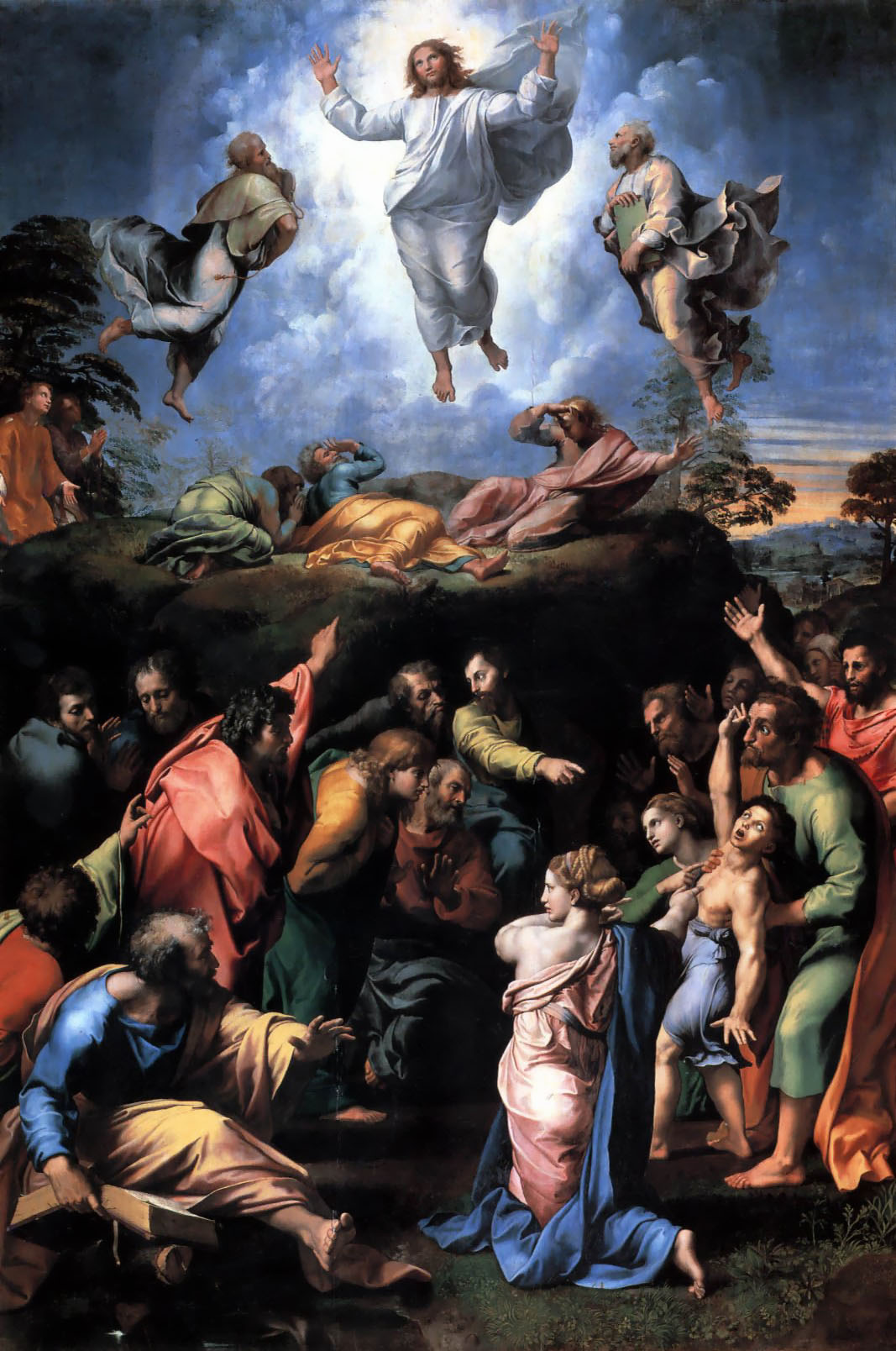
Raphael's painting The Transfiguration comforts the novel's protagonist; the face of Jesus Christ is able to "cease the burning torment that consumed the marrow of his bones".

The novel extrapolates Balzac's analysis of desire from the individual to society; he feared that the world, like Valentin, was losing its way due to material excess and misguided priorities. In the gambling house, the orgiastic feast, the antique shop, and the discussions with men of science, Balzac examines this dilemma in various contexts. The lust for social status to which Valentin is led by Rastignac is emblematic of this excess; the gorgeous but unattainable Foedora symbolizes the pleasures offered by high society.

Science offers no panacea. In one scene, a group of doctors offer a range of quickly formulated opinions as to the cause of Valentin's feebleness. In another, a physicist and a chemist admit defeat after employing a range of tactics designed to stretch the skin. All of these scientific approaches lack an understanding of the true crisis, and are therefore doomed to fail. Although it is only shown in glimpses – the image of Christ, for example, painted by Valentin's namesake, the Renaissance artist Raphael – Balzac wished to remind readers that Christianity offered the potential to temper deadly excess. After failing in their efforts to stretch the skin, the chemist declares: "I believe in the devil"; "And I in God", replies the physicist.

The corruption of excess is related to social disorganization in a description at the start of the final section. Physically feeble though living in absolute luxury, Raphaël de Valentin is described as retaining in his eyes "an extraordinary intelligence" with which he is able to see "everything at once":

That expression was painful to see ... It was the inscrutable glance of helplessness that must perforce consign its desires to the depths of its own heart; or of a miser enjoying in imagination all the pleasures that his money could procure for him, while he declines to lessen his hoard; the look of a bound Prometheus, of the fallen Napoleon of 1815, when he learned at the Elysee the strategical blunder that his enemies had made, and asked for twenty-four hours of command in vain ...

== Reception and legacy ==
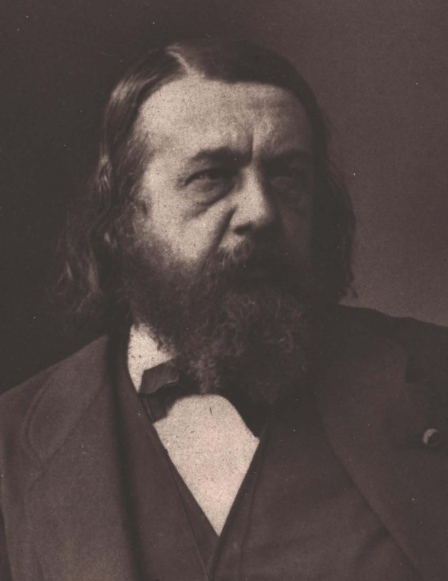
Balzac's friend Théophile Gautier paid tribute to Balzac's novel in his 1833 story collection Les Jeunes-France.

The novel sold out immediately after going on sale, and was reviewed in every major Parisian newspaper and magazine. In some cases Balzac wrote the reviews himself; using the name "Comte Alex de B—", he announced that the book proved he had achieved "the stature of genius". Independent reviews were less sweeping, but also very positive. Poet Émile Deschamps praised the rhythm of the novel, and the religious commentator Charles Forbes René de Montalembert indicated approvingly that it highlighted the need for more spirituality in society as a whole. Although some critics chastised Balzac for reveling in negativity, others felt it simply reflected the condition of French society. German writer Johann Wolfgang von Goethe declared it a shining example of the "incurable corruption of the French nation". Critics argue about whether Goethe's comments were praise for the novel or not.

This storm of publicity caused a flurry of activity as readers around France scrambled to obtain the novel. Balzac's friend and La Caricature editor Charles Philipon wrote to the author one week after publication: "there is no getting hold of La Peau de chagrin. Grandville had to stop everything to read it, because the librarian sent round every half-hour to ask if he had finished." Friends near and far wrote to Balzac indicating their similar difficulties in locating copies. The second edition was released one month later, and it was followed by parodies and derivative works from other writers. Balzac's friend Théophile Gautier included a comical homage in his 1833 story collection Les Jeunes-France when, during a recreation of the feast from Balzac's novel, a character says: "This is the point at which I'm supposed to pour wine down my waistcoat ... It says so in black and white on page 171 of La Peau de chagrin ... And this is where I have to toss a 100-sou coin in the air to see whether or not there's a God."

The novel established Balzac as a prominent figure in the world of French literature. Publishers fought among themselves to publish his future work, and he became a mainstay on the list of invitation for social functions around Paris. Balzac took pride in his novel's success, and declared to the editor of the journal L'Avenir that "Elle est donc le point de départ de mon ouvrage" ("This is the point of departure for my body of work"). Consistently popular even after his death, La Peau de chagrin was republished nineteen times between 1850 and 1880.

When he developed his scheme for organizing all of his novels and stories into a single sequence called La Comédie humaine, Balzac placed La Peau de chagrin at the start of the section called Études philosophiques ("Philosophical Studies"). Like the other works in this category – including the similarly autobiographical Louis Lambert (1832) – it deals with philosophy and the supernatural. But it also provides a bridge to the realism of the Études des mœurs ("Study of Manners"), where the majority of his novels were located.

=== L'Étrangère ===
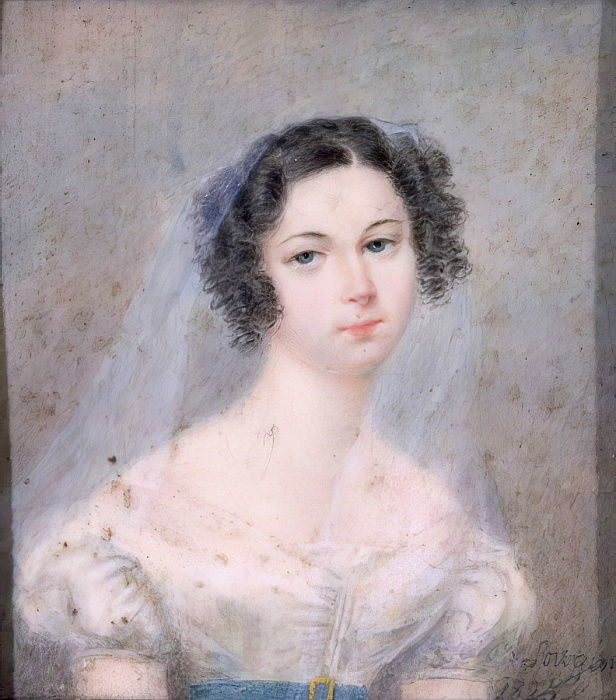
Polish baroness Ewelina Hańska wrote to Balzac after reading La Peau de chagrin, signing her letter L'Étrangère ("The Stranger", "The Foreigner"). They married in 1850.

The popularity of the novel extended to Ukraine, where a baroness named Ewelina Hańska read about Balzac's novels in newspapers she received from Paris. Intrigued, she ordered copies of his work, and she read them with her cousins and friends around Volhynia. They were impressed by the understanding he showed toward women in La Physiologie du mariage, but felt that La Peau de chagrin portrayed them in a cruel and unforgiving light. Hańska wrote a letter to Balzac, signed it as L'Étrangère ("The Stranger"), and mailed it from Odessa on 28 February 1832.

With no return address, Balzac was left to reply in the Gazette de France, with the hope that she would see the notice. She did not, but wrote again in November: "Your soul embraces centuries, monsieur; its philosophical concepts appear to be the fruit of long study matured by time; yet I am told you are still young. I would like to know you, but feel I have no need to do so. I know you through my own spiritual instinct; I picture you in my own way, and feel that if I were to actually set eyes upon you, I should instantly exclaim, 'That is he!'"

Eventually she revealed herself to him, and they began a correspondence that lasted for fifteen years. Although she remained faithful to her husband Wacław, Mme. Hańska and Balzac enjoyed an emotional intimacy through their letters. When the baron died in 1841, the French author began to pursue the relationship outside the written page. They wed in the town of Berdychiv on 14 March 1850, five months before he died.

=== Recurring characters ===
Because it was among the first novels he released under his own name, Balzac did not use characters in La Peau de chagrin from previous works. He did, however, introduce several individuals who resurfaced in later stories. Most significant of these is Eugène de Rastignac, the older gentleman who tutors Valentin in the vicious ways of high society. Thirty pages into the writing of his 1834 novel Le Père Goriot, Balzac suddenly crossed out the name he had been using for a character – Massiac – and used Rastignac instead. The relationship between teacher and student in La Peau de chagrin is mirrored in Le Père Goriot, when the young Rastignac is guided in the ways of social realpolitik by the incognito criminal Vautrin.

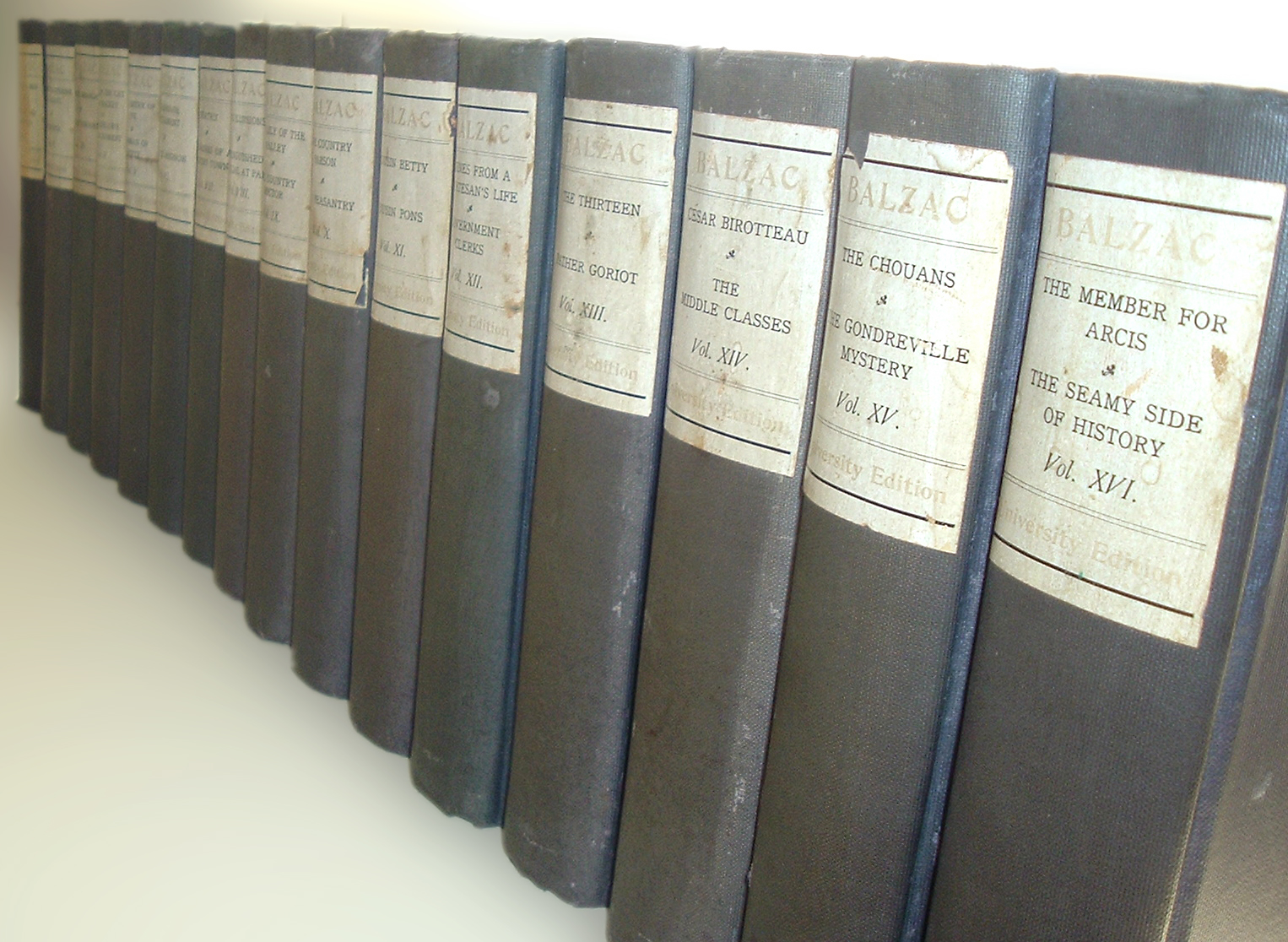
La Peau de chagrin is one of nearly 100 stories in Balzac's collection La Comédie humaine.

Balzac used the character Foedora in three other stories, but eventually wrote her out of them after deciding on other models for social femininity. In later editions of La Peau de chagrin, he changed the text to name one of the bankers "Taillefer", whom he had introduced in L'Auberge rouge (1831). He also used the name Horace Bianchon for one of the doctors, thus connecting the book to the famous physician who appears in thirty-one stories in La Comédie humaine. So vividly had the doctor been rendered that Balzac himself called out for Bianchon while lying on his deathbed.

The use of recurring characters lends Balzac's work a cohesion and atmosphere unlike any other series of novels. It enables a depth of characterization that goes beyond simple narration or dialogue. "When the characters reappear", notes the critic Samuel Rogers, "they do not step out of nowhere; they emerge from the privacy of their own lives which, for an interval, we have not been allowed to see." Although the complexity of these characters' lives inevitably led Balzac to make errors of chronology and consistency, the mistakes are considered minor in the overall scope of the project. Readers are more often troubled by the sheer number of people in Balzac's world, and feel deprived of important context for the characters. Detective novelist Arthur Conan Doyle said that he never tried to read Balzac, because he "did not know where to begin".

=== Influence ===
Balzac's novel was adapted for the libretto of Giselher Klebe's 1959 opera Die tödlichen Wünsche (The Deadly Wishes). 1977–1978 the German composer Fritz Geißler composed Das Chagrinleder after a libretto by Günther Deicke. In 1989–1990 the Russian composer Yuri Khanon wrote the ballet L’Os de chagrin (The Shagreen Bone), based on Balzac's text, which included an opera-interlude of the same name. In 1992 a biographic pseudo-documentary in the form of an opera-film based on his opera L'os de Chagrin («Chagrenevaia Kost»,ru) was released.

The novel has also been cited as a possible influence on Oscar Wilde for his 1890 novel The Picture of Dorian Gray, although this hypothesis is rejected by most scholars. The protagonist, Dorian Gray, acquires a magical portrait that ages while he remains forever youthful.

Russian literature specialist Priscilla Meyer maintains in her book How the Russians Read the French, that both La Peau de Chagrin and Pere Goriot were extensively paralleled, subverted and inverted, by Dostoevsky in Crime and Punishment.

The story was first adapted into a 1909 French silent film entitled The Wild Ass's Skin, directed by Albert Capellani, written by Michel Carre and starring Henri Desfontaines, which, despite its brief 19-minute running time, was formatted into three acts.

In 1915, American director Richard Ridgely made a film adaptation of Balzac's novel entitled The Magic Skin for Thomas A. Edison, Inc. The 50-minute film starred Mabel Trunnelle, Bigelow Cooper, and Everett Butterfield, and diluted the supernatural aspects of the story by revealing it all to be a dream.

In 1920, it was adapted again as a 54-minute British silent film called Desire (aka The Magic Skin), written and directed by George Edwardes-Hall, and starring Dennis Neilson-Terry, Yvonne Arnaud and Christine Maitland.

In 1943, the novel was adapted as an Argentine film titled La piel de zapa, featuring famous actor and singer Hugo del Carril.

George D. Baker directed yet another version of the story, a 1923 American silent film called Slave of Desire starring George Walsh and Bessie Love.

In 1960 Croatian animator Vladimir Kristl made an animated short entitled Šagrenska koža (The Piece of Shagreen Leather) inspired by Balzac's novel.

It was adapted for French television in 1980, with Marc Delsaert, Catriona MacColl, Anne Caudry, Richard Fontana and Alain Cuny.

In 2010, a French and Belgian television film adaptation titled The Skin of Sorrow featured Thomas Coumans, Mylène Jampanoï, Jean-Paul Dubois, Julien Honoré, Jean-Pierre Marielle and Annabelle Hettmann.

Toward the end of his life, Austrian psychoanalyst Sigmund Freud felt a special connection to Balzac's novel, since he believed that his world was shrinking like Valentin's talisman. Diagnosed with a fatal tumor, Freud resolved to commit suicide. After re-reading La Peau de chagrin, he said to his doctor: "This was the proper book for me to read; it deals with shrinking and starvation." The next day, his doctor administered a lethal dose of morphine, and Freud died.

In 2011 French director Marianne Badrichani staged an adaptation of La Peau de Chagrin in London's Holland Park.

The novel was the basis for the 2026 comic book Chagrin by Rodolphe and Griffo.
