= Judith and Holofernes (Vernet) =

Painting by Horace Vernet

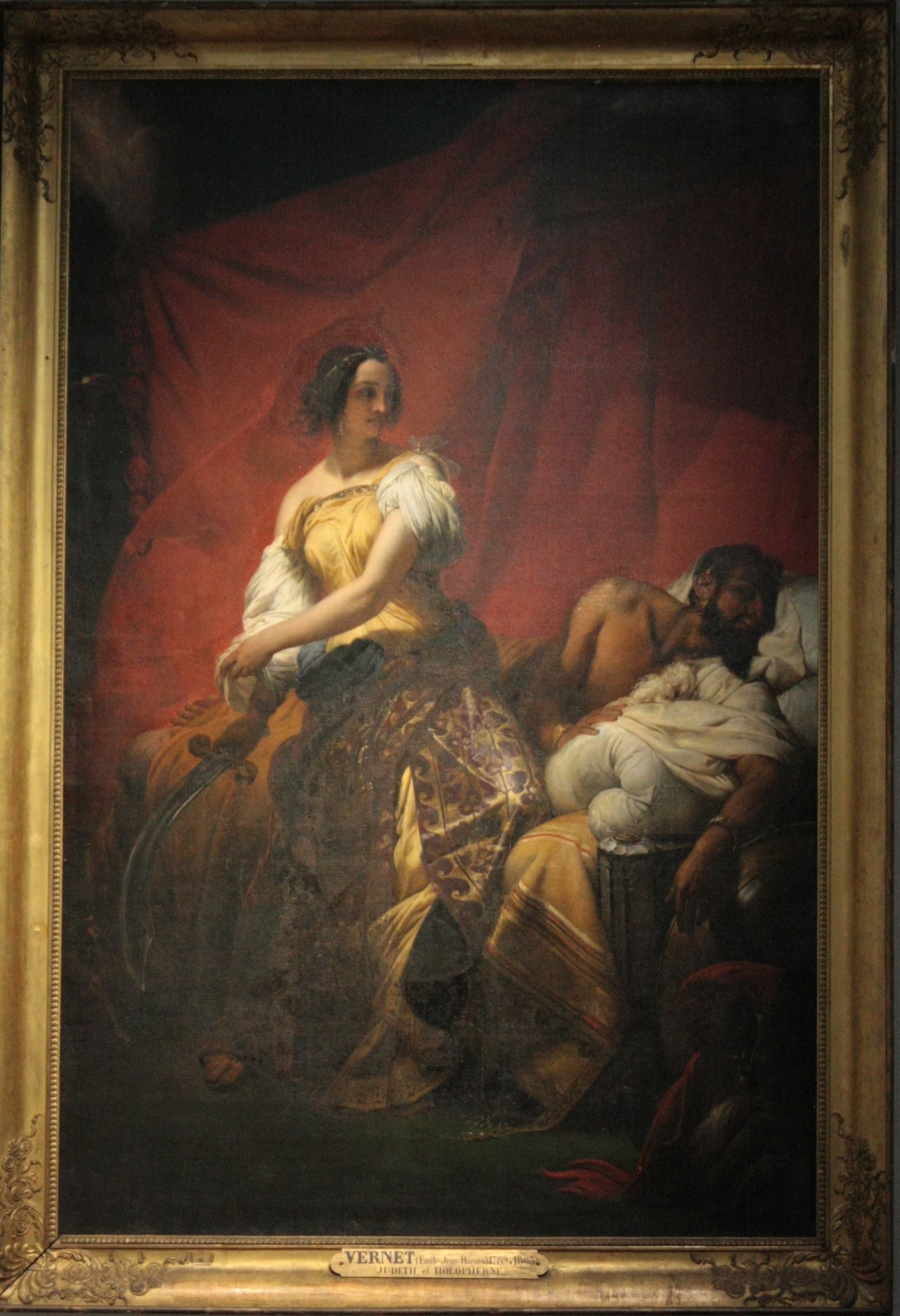
Judith and Holofernes (1830) by Horace Vernet

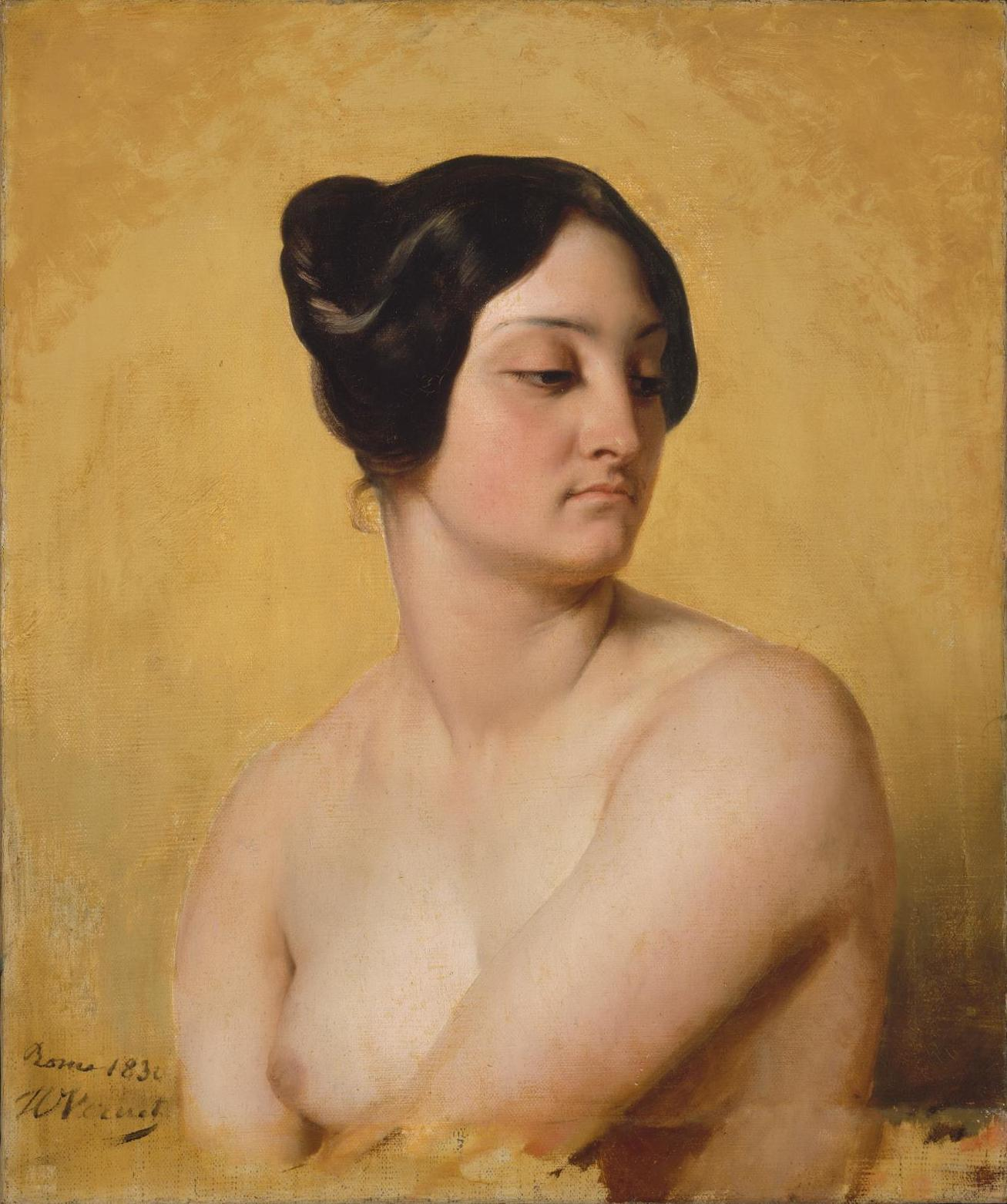
Study of Olympe Pélissier as Judith, 1830 (Boston Museum of Fine Arts).

Judith and Holofernes is an oil on canvas painting by Horace Vernet, from 1830. He was then director of the Académie de France à Rome It shows Judith just before beheading Holofernes. Since 22 December 1912 it has been in the Musée des Beaux-Arts de Pau.

== History ==
Two models sat for the work; Olympe Pélissier for Judith and Federico Ricci as Holofernes. Vernet produced two studies - a nude bust of Pélissier and a study of two figures together, with Judith seducing and in contact with Holofernes, unlike the finished work.

It was first exhibited at the 1831 Paris Salon, where it was noted by the art critics Étienne-Jean Delécluze, Charles Blanc and Heinrich Heine. It influenced the chapter "Sous la tente" in Gustave Flaubert's Salammbô, A Woman's Vengeance in Jules Barbey d'Aurevilly's Les Diaboliques and Friedrich Hebbel's play Judith.

It was bought by the Direction des Musées Royaux, and placed on display at the Musée du Luxembourg before the end of that year. It was moved to the Château de Saint-Cloud in 1835. It was later assigned to the Department of Paintings in the Louvre, before being deposited in its present home.

A copy of the work by a painter called "Rouede" or "Rouche", who eventually became a pupil of Vernet, was rediscovered in the 1990s around dustbins by an inhabitant of Toulouse.

== Bibliography (in French) ==
- Ambroise, Guillaume; Ségura, Patrick; Vasquez, Dominique (2007). Peintures du 19th century. Musée des beaux-arts de Pau. Bordeaux: Le Festin. p. 120-121. ISBN 978-2-915262-56-8.
- Comte, Philippe (1977). "Judith et Holopherne ou la naissance d'une tragédie". Revue du Louvre et des musées de France (3): 137–139..
- Comte, Philippe (1993). Ville de Pau : Musée des Beaux-Arts, catalogue des peintures, 2nd edition.
