= Rossini! Rossini! =

- Directed by: Mario Monicelli
- Written by: Mario Monicelli; Suso Cecchi d'Amico; Nicola Badalucco; Bruno Cagli
- Starring: Sergio Castellitto; Sabine Azéma
- Cinematography: Franco Di Giacomo
- Edited by: Ruggero Mastroianni
- Music by: Giovanni Pergolesi; Gioachino Rossini
- Release date: 1991
- Running time: 130 minutes
- Country: Italy
- Language: Italian

Rossini! Rossini! is a 1991 Italian biographical film written and directed by Mario Monicelli. It depicts real life events of composer Gioachino Rossini. Monicelli replaced Robert Altman, who was experiencing differences with the producers. The film won the David di Donatello for Best Costumes.

== Plot ==
In 1816 the Italian composer Gioachino Rossini is already famous all over the country. However, his last opera The Barber of Seville is not understood and even booed by the audience at La Scala for the indecency of the sets and love situations. Also disappointed by the replicas at the Teatro San Carlo in Naples, then Rossini decides to move to Paris, where he is hailed as a genius.

== Cast ==
- Sergio Castellitto as Young Rossini
- Philippe Noiret as Old Rossini
- Giorgio Gaber as Domenico Barbaja
- Jacqueline Bisset as Isabella Colbran
- Assumpta Serna as Maria Marcolini
- Sabine Azéma as Olympe Pélissier
- Galeazzo Benti as La Rochefoucauld
- Feodor Chaliapin Jr. as Baron Rothschild
- Claudio Gora as Dr. Bardos
- Silvia Cohen as Marietta Alboni
- Pia Velsi as Adina
- Maurizio Mattioli as Mimì
- Vittorio Gassman as Ludwig van Beethoven (cameo)
