= Chagrin (comic book) =

2026 comic book by Rodolphe and Griffo

- Page count: 136 pages
- Publisher: Glénat Éditions

Creative team
- Writer: Rodolphe, after Honoré de Balzac
- Artist: Griffo
- Colourist: Griffo

Original publication
- Date of publication: 4 March 2026
- Language: French
- ISBN: 9782344068458

Chagrin is a 2026 comic book by the French writer Rodolphe and Belgian illustrator Griffo.

== Background ==
The story was adapted from the 1831 novel La Peau de chagrin by Honoré de Balzac. It was the sixth collaboration between Rodolphe and Griffo.

== Plot ==
In Paris in the 1830s, the impoverished nobleman Raphaël de Valentin has a gambling addiction, longs for social status and tries to write an autobiographical novel. He comes over a magic shagreen skin that can fulfill any wish he has, but shrinks and shortens his life with each wish.

== Publication ==
The comic book is 136 pages long and was published by Glénat Éditions on 4 March 2026.

== Reception ==
Denis Marc of RTBF called Rodolphe's adaptation "brilliant" and wrote that Griffo's drawings create the "ideal atmosphere" for the downfall and pain of the main character. Benoist Marchon of ActuaBD wrote that Griffo has employed a dynamic style and envisioned the alleys and monuments of 19th-century Paris with "mischievous pleasure", which includes some anachronisms. Marchon wrote that the cover image does not reflect the comic's quality and may make people refrain from reading it.
