= Olympe Pélissier =

French artists' model

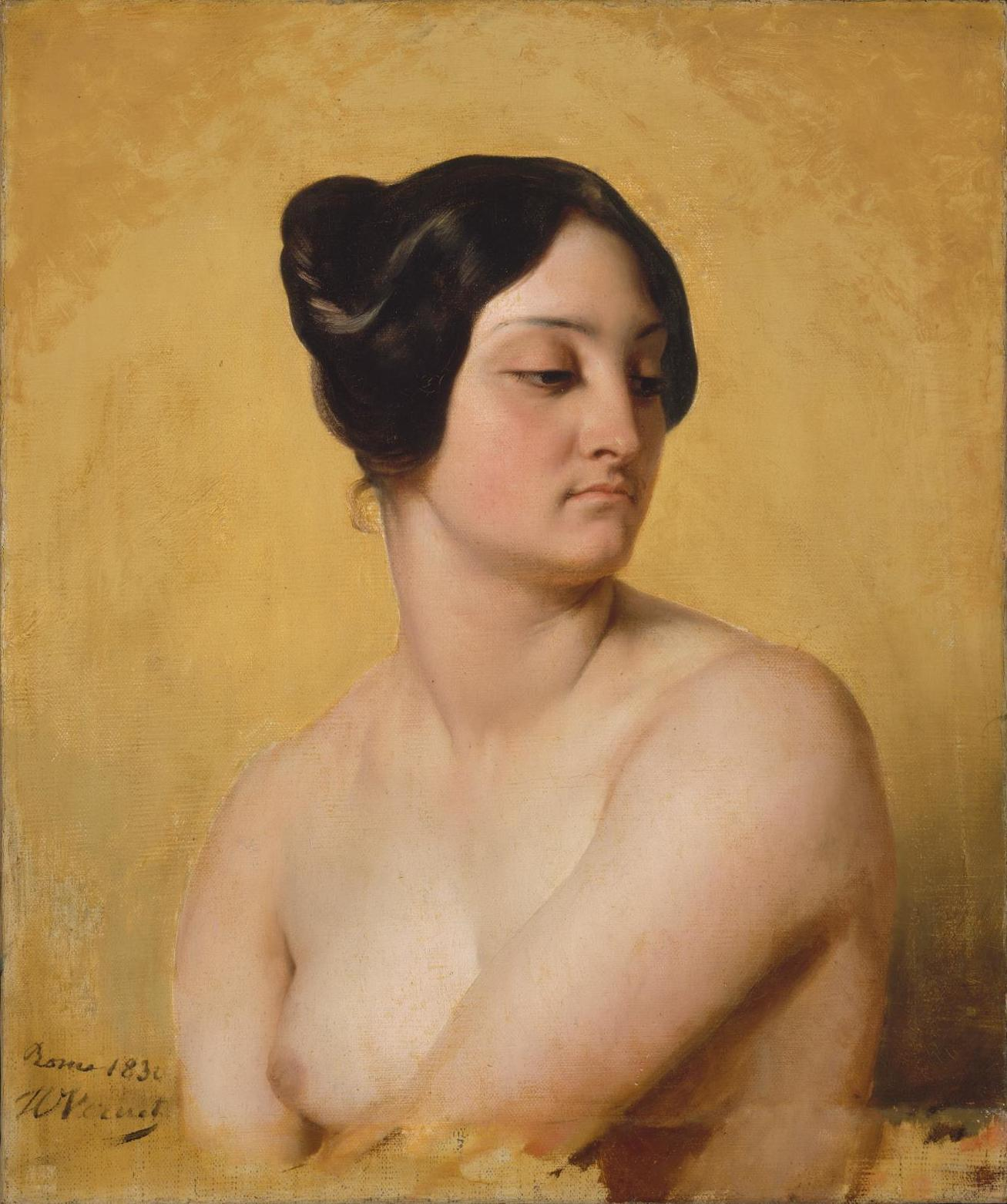
- Study of Olympe Pélissier by Horace Vernet for his Judith and Holofernes
- Born: 9 May 1799; Paris, France
- Died: 22 March 1878 (aged 78); Paris, France
- Occupation: Courtesan
- Spouse: Gioachino Rossini

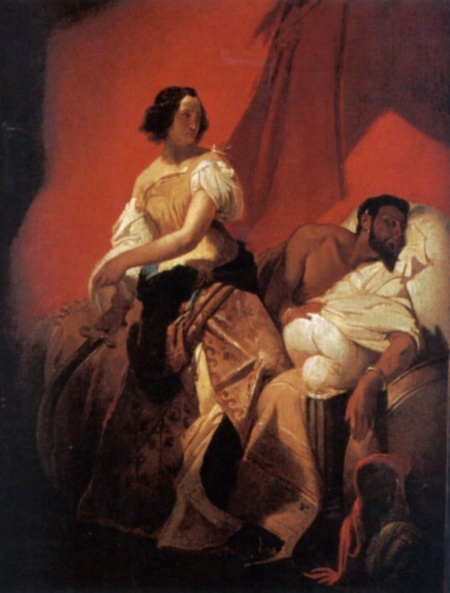
Vernet's Judith and Holofernes, for which Pélissier modelled

Olympe Pélissier (9 May 1799 – 22 March 1878) was a French artists' model and courtesan and the second wife of the Italian composer Gioachino Rossini. She sat for Vernet for his painting of Judith and Holofernes. Honoré de Balzac described her as "the most beautiful courtesan in Paris".

== Biography ==
Olympe Pélissier was born in Paris on 9 May 1799, out of wedlock, to an unmarried woman who later married Joseph Pélissier. She was sold by her mother at age fifteen to a young duke, who installed her in a small furnished house. The duke contracted a venereal disease and had to give her up. Pélissier was then sold to a rich Anglo-American. She soon gained her independence and began to look for other lovers.

Under the Bourbon Restoration, Pélissier had been a notable figure in Parisian society, admired by the Comte de Girardin, holding salons attended by Baron Schikler, and in 1830 had a liaison with the writer Eugène Sue, who introduced her to Honoré de Balzac. Pélissier and Balzac were lovers for a year, starting in 1830. After Pélissier rejected him, the affair left Balzac full of resentments. A few years later Balzac called Pélissier "an evil courtesan." Amongst her lovers, who included aristocrats, artistic and literary figures, were the painters Horace Vernet and Alfred d'Orsay and the musician Vincenzo Bellini.

The affair with Sue was longer lasting, but the relationship consisted of a frequent swing between quarrels and strong passions. It ended when Pélissier met Gioacchino Rossini. She and Rossini first met in the 1830s in the aftermath of his separation from his first wife Isabella Colbran. The couple lived in his house in Paris until a cholera epidemic forced them to leave the city in favour of Italy. At the end of 1836, they moved to Bologna, where for etiquette's sake they lived under separate roofs. In Bologna Pélissier met Rossini's first wife, Isabella Colbran. Pélissier felt suffocated in Bologna and pressured her companion to move. In November 1837 they moved to Milan where they held musical evenings every Friday night. Among the regular guests was Franz Liszt. However, she held the social position of the courtesan, a companion, but not a future bride to the composer. Even Marie d'Agoult, who had abandoned her husband to follow the musician Liszt, was sceptical: "Rossini spent the winter in Milan with Mademoiselle Pélissier and tried to introduce her into society, but no lady of class ever visited her".

In October 1845 Isabella, Rossini's first wife died, and in August 1846 Rossini and Pélissier married. Bologna was being affected by uprisings as part of the 1848 Revolution, so the couple moved to Florence. They stayed for seven years, during which time Rossini's health declined. He suffered from depression, caused by the effects of gonorrhea. Pélissier missed Paris, and wished to return there to seek medical help for Rossini, so in May 1855 they returned there, taking a large apartment on the Rue de la Chaussée-d'Antin.

In Paris they restarted their musical evenings, which became legendary within Paris society. Guests included Alexandre Dumas fils, Eugène Delacroix, Franz Liszt, and Giuseppe Verdi. The couple had a new villa constructed in the Passy suburb of Paris in 1859. Rossini died a rich man in 1868, allowing Pélissier to live a comfortable life after his death, although on her death, the estate was to pass to the Municipality of Pesaro to establish the Conservatorio Statale di Musica "Gioachino Rossini".

Olympe Pélissier died on 22 March 1878.

== In art and literature ==
I offer these modest songs to my dear wife Olympe as a simple testimony of gratitude for the affectionate, intelligent care which she lavished on me during my overlong and terrible illness.

— Dedication of Musique anodine, 1857

Her lover, the painter Horace Vernet, painted her as Judith in his 1830 work Judith and Holofernes.

Balzac cast her as the merciless Fedora in his 1831 novel La Peau de chagrin. The incident where the hero, Raphaël de Valentin, secretes himself in Fedora's bedroom was reputedly based on an experience Balzac had with Pélissier, although Balzac denied this.

In 1832, Rossini composed the cantata Giovanna d'Arco (Joan of Arc) in her honour. In 1857 he dedicated Musique anodine to her.

Pélissier is a character in the 1974 French television film Eugène Sue, played by Claudine Coster.

The 1991 Mario Monicelli film Rossini! Rossini! about the life of Rossini features Sabine Azéma as Pélissier.

== Bibliography ==
- Baccolini, Luca (2017). Storie segrete della storia di Bologna (in Italian). Newton Compton Editori. ISBN 9788822713322.
- Barricelli, Jean-Pierre (2017). Balzac and Music: Its Place and Meaning in His Life and Work. Routledge. ISBN 9781317208563.
- Franceschi, Leonardo De (2001). Lo sguardo eclettico: il cinema di Mario Monicelli. Marsilio. ISBN 978-8831777636.
- Christians, Ian; Groves, Sir Charles (2016). Discovering Classical Music. Pen and Sword. ISBN 9781473887879.
- Migozzi, Jacques; Guern, Philippe Le, eds. (2004). Productions du populaire: colloque international de Limoges, 14-16 mai 2002 (in French). Presses Univ. Limoges. ISBN 9782842873370.
- Miller, Christopher L. (2007). The French Atlantic Triangle: Literature and Culture of the Slave Trade. Duke University Press. ISBN 9780822388838.
- Osborne, Richard (2004). "Rossini's life". In Senici, Emanuele; Cross, Jonathan (eds.). The Cambridge Companion to Rossini. Cambridge University Press. pp. 11–25. ISBN 9780521001953.
- Osborne, Richard (2007). Rossini. Oxford University Press. ISBN 9780199884575.
- Roberts, Warren (2015). Rossini and Post-Napoleonic Europe. Boydell & Brewer. ISBN 9781580465304.
- Stokes, Richard (2008). "Notes to Hyperion CD CDA 67647". Hyperion Records.
