= Marianne Badrichani =

Franco-British theatre director

- Born: Marianne Brault; Paris
- Occupation(s): Theatre director, writer, producer

Marianne Badrichani (Brault-Badrichani) is a Franco-British theatre maker, director, dramatist, producer and acting coach. She is based in London.

== Career ==
With a background in film production in Paris, she trained at the Royal Central School of Speech and Drama and with Katie Mitchell at the National Theatre Studio. She began directing and co-producing plays and immersive performances in London in 2000, presenting productions across London, in the Fringe, Off-West End and West End, as well as in unusual venues (Brompton Cemetery, Holland Park, Harrow Train Station, etc..).

She is a member of the Cross Channel Theatre Group, an initiative launched by the Institut Francais du Royaume-Uni which promotes French new writing in the UK - she was also their resident artist between 2014 and 2016. In 2012, she directed shows in China, where she took Cravate Club/Members Only by Fabrice Roger-Lacan then Trois Ruptures/Three Splits by Rémi De Vos in May 2015 after a run at the Coronet Theatre.

She has worked on a trilogy of new adaptations staging French playwrights discussing their work with the characters of their plays (Ionesco/Dinner at the Smiths) or with their muses (Sacha Guitry, Ma Fille et Moi). After a run in London in 2018, Sacha Guitry, Ma Fille et Moi returned to the Playground Theatre (Notting Hill, London) in January 2019. In 2022 her production Je t'aime moi non plus/Texts by Moliere was staged in London, in Edinburgh at the French Institute for Scotland, and in Paris at the Théâtre Montparnasse.

She is an associate artist at Elephant and Castle's BOLD Theatre founded by Sarah Davey-Hull since 2020. She co-directed What They Forgot To tell Us (2021) and The Foreigners' Panto (2023)at Bold with Shani Erez and Sarah Goddard. Her latest project was French Toast, adapted from a play by Jean Poiret, which successfully ran at Riverside Studios in October 2024.

== Productions ==
=== As director/theatre maker ===
Plays include : French Toast at Riverside Studios, Je t'aime moi non plus/Texts by Molière at Institut français du Royaume-Uni, Chelsea Theatre, Theatre Montparnasse,Sacha Guitry, Ma Fille et Moi, Trois Ruptures/Three Splits by Rémi De Vos with Chris Campbell and Edith Vernes (Print Room, Chelsea Theatre and the Nine Theatre in Beijing), Members Only with Robert Bathurst and Nicholas Tennant (Trafalgar Studios and Oriental Palace in Beijing), The Little Black Book with Paul McGann and Susannah Harker and Three Women with Marcia Warren, Annie Firbank and Camilla Rutherford (both at Riverside Studios), The Match by Driss Ksikes at Gate Theatre for Nour Festival, Paris Calling New Writing (Royal National Theatre).

=== As translator/writer ===
The Season in the Congo for Joe Wright and the Young Vic, Dr Seuss' The Cat in the Hat for Katie Mitchell, Interiors for Vanishing Point (both at Theatre de la Ville, Paris).

== Honours ==
Marianne Badrichani was appointed Chevalier des Arts et des Lettres by the French Ministry of Culture in 2024.

== Other work ==
She also teaches drama at Lamda, run workshops at Westminster School and is a member of the audition panel at the Royal Central School of Speech and Drama.
