= La Revue des musées de France =

La Revue des musées de France, Revue du Louvre is a publication produced by the council for the national museums of France. It includes news of museum acquisitions and articles on works in French museums. Its chief editors are currently Françoise Baratte, Geneviève Bresc-Bautier, Christian Briend, Anne Distel and Stéphane Loire.

It has existed under its current name since 2004. It was founded in 1951 as La Revue des arts, being renamed La Revue des arts, Musées de France in 1958, La Revue du Louvre et des musées de France at an unknown date, and Revue du Louvre, Revue des musées de France in 1991. It was reduced to four issues a year in 2017.
