= Isabella Colbran =

Spanish opera singer

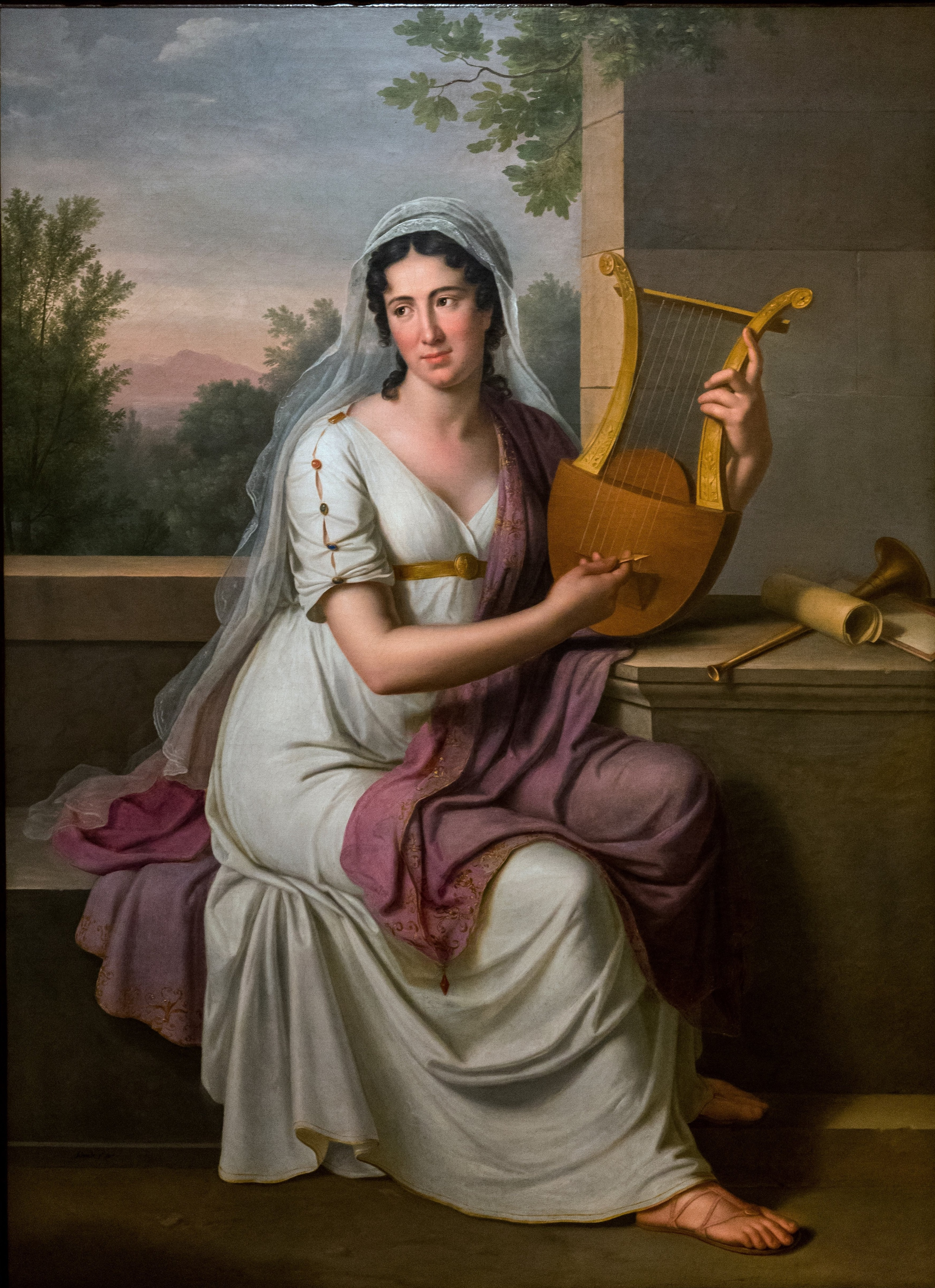
Isabella Colbran painted by Heinrich Schmidt

Isabella Angela Colbran (2 February 1785 – 7 October 1845) was a Spanish opera soprano and composer. She was known as the muse and first wife of composer Gioachino Rossini.

== Early years ==
Colbran was born in Madrid, Spain, to Giovanni Colbran, King of Spain Carlos III's head court musician and violinist, and Teresa Ortola. She started her musical studies as a singer and composer at the age of six with composer and cellist Francisco Parjea, castrato Carlo Martinelli, and famous castrato and composer Girolamo Crescentini. In 1801, Colbran and her father moved to Paris where she made her concert debut and was warmly received by Napoleon's court. Both of them traveled to Italy, going to Milan, Venice, Rome, before settling and moving permanently to Naples. She inherited land in Sicily and a villa in Castenaso in 1820, after her father's death.

== Opera career ==
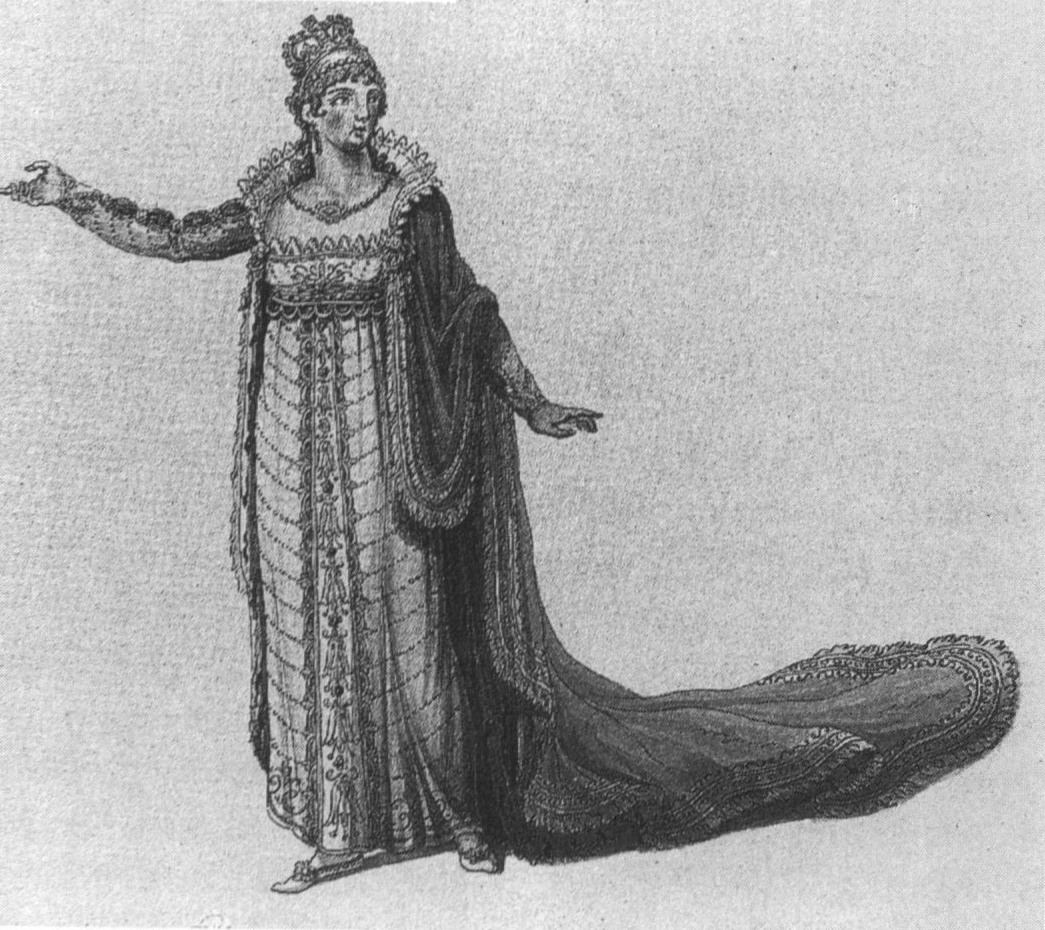
Colbran as Elisabetta, by Giacomo Pregliasco (1815)

Colbran's dramatic soprano voice and sizable three octave range, along with her significant dramatic abilities, allowed her to have an extremely successful operatic career. She was described as a true dramatic soprano capable of the most elaborate coloratura. She mainly acted in grand, tragic roles, which never saw her doing comedic operas. The timbre of her voice was described at "sweet and mellow, with a rich middle register able conjure touching lyricism." She was said to have "the celestial art of singing to such a degree that signs of the liveliest admiration for and purest delight in her have been made clear and manifest in the places of the major monarchs of Europe". She had the advantage of a voice of exceptional compass and of striking dignity of movement and gesture. She sang at Accademia Polimniaca and Accademia Filarmonica in Bologna in 1807 before moving on to Teatro alla Scala in 1807. For nearly a decade Colbran was considered one of the best singers in Europe and had a large and loyal following, especially in Naples, and was loved by King Charles VI. She was hired with a 7-year contract with the Teatro di San Carlo and became the mistress of impresario Domenico Barbaia, which lasted less than a year. Colbran had the great ability, beauty of tone, and the ability to sustain phrases of canto spianato. (Note: canto spianato: style that includes cantabile and portamento; requires legato, smooth register change, limited ornamentation.) She started working with composer Gioachino Rossini, who would end up writing 18 operas just for her voice from 1815 to 1823, including Otello, Armida and Maometto II. Rossini said that Colbran was the "greatest interpreter of his music". Critics described Colbran's talent as "a wealth of exquisitely observed detail [that] could be read into the statuesque calm of her every gesture". The vocal demands of the roles Rossini had created for her is inferred to be a cause to the rapid deterioration of her voice and vocal cords. By the age of 20, she had performed and wooed the crowds of all of Europe. She was described by Stendhal as "a beauty of the most imposing sort; with large features that are superb on the stage, magnificent stature, blazing eyes, à la circassienne, a forest of the most beautiful jet-black hair, and, finally, an instinct for tragedy. As soon as she appeared [on stage] wearing a diadem on her head, she commanded involuntary respect even from people who had just left her in the foyer." From 1806 to 1815, she was considered the most celebrated soprano in all of Europe. In 1823, her fee per opera was £1,500. Overall, she was considered the queen of Theatro di San Carlo, and just the queen of theatre, for a very long time.

On 2 January 1823, the phrase "Pray for the Soul of Colbran Rossini" (pregate per l'anima della Colbran Rossini) was inscribed on the walls of Venice. This was because of the opera Maometto II's first performance in Venice on 26 December 1822, which had been met with much dissent from the audience, who had gone ill-disposed to the theatre. While Colbran's performance was praised, the opera was receiving criticisms and threats to the actors and actresses' lives if they chose to continue. The opera gave 25 performances in Italy, and eventually gave additional performances in France. The opera is considered one of Rossini's boldest and most politically motivated.

== Later years ==
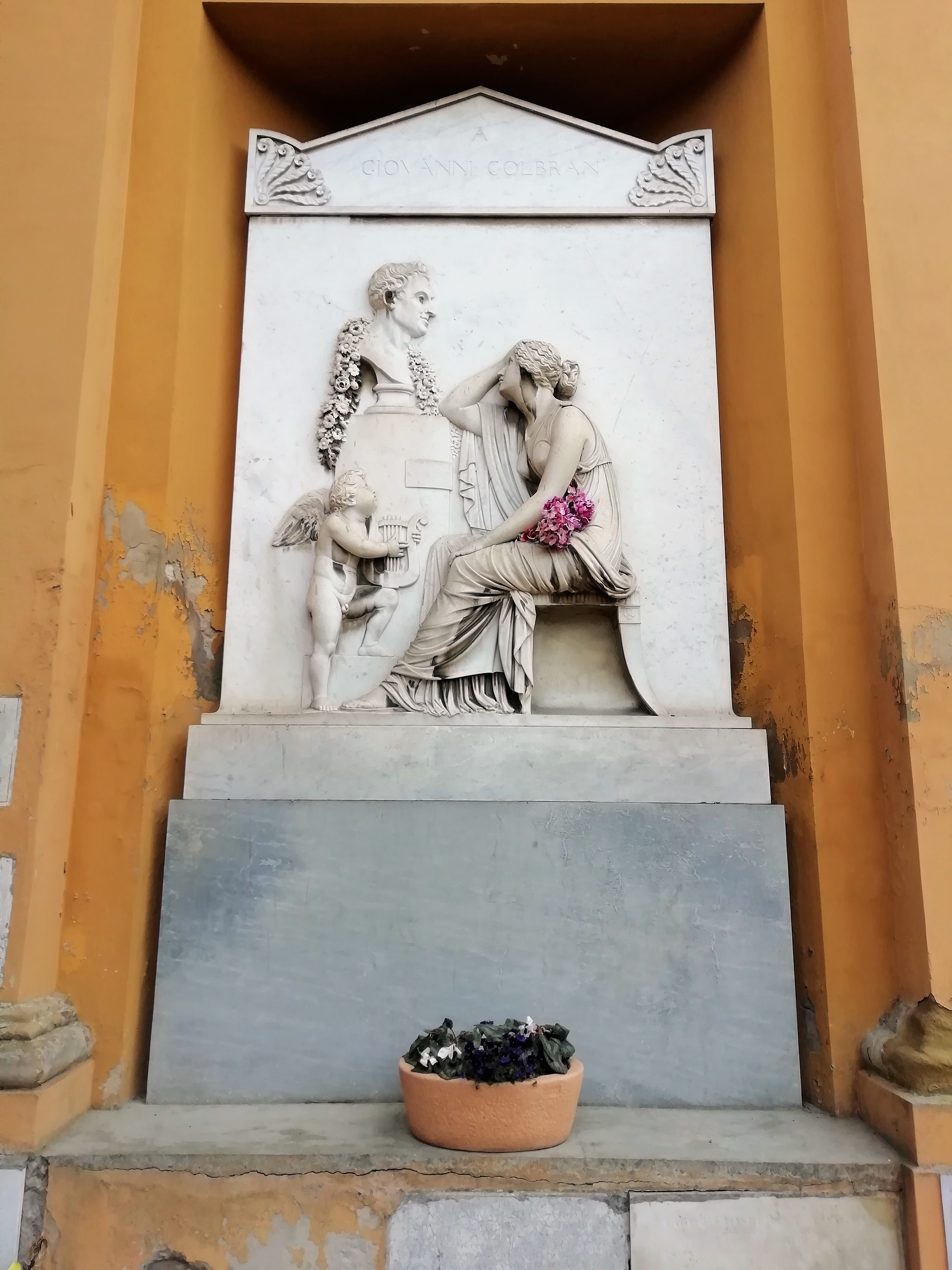
Colbran-Rossini Memorial

Colbran's voice and sense of pitch in performance declined in 1815, but she continued to perform for many years after. It is said she suffered from a strained voice, which is another way for saying she had a hard time staying in tune. She finally retired from singing in 1824 at the age of 42 and started composing shortly after. She fell ill around 1830, which may be a contributor to her debilitating gambling habits that started around this time. Her health had become ruined by the chronic gonoccal pelvic inflammatory disease that was given to her by Rossini. Isabella ended up living with Rossini's father Giuseppe Rossini, until her death on 7 October 1845. She died in the villa in Castenaso, given to her in her father's will.

== Marriage ==
In 1815, while in Naples, Colbran met Rossini, where she quickly became his muse. He was contacted to write an opera by Domenico Barbaia about Queen Elizabeth of England, eventually writing the opera Elisabetta, regina d'Inghilterra, specifically writing the main voice part for Colbran. After many years of dating, they wed on 16 March 1822 at the church of Beata Vergine del Pilar in Castenaso, near Bologna. After their marriage, Rossini took control of all her jobs, money, inherited land, and everything she owned, calling her his property in letters. The couple then traveled to Vienna and London to tour Rossini's operas. She was called his protectress by Rossini's close friends. When Colbran's father died in 1820, Rossini bought him a tomb for him on his family's cemetery plot, officially making it the Colbran-Rossini plot. While they had very successful careers working with each other, their marriage was not a very happy one. Rossini cheated on Colbran with many different women while he would tour after she retired as a singer. Rossini left her sometime between 1829 and 1837, some sources saying they were divorced in 1837. He courted many women during this time, eventually dating Olympe Pélissier in 1830. Rossini continued to financially support Colbran until her death. When word got back to Rossini in August 1845 how ill she truly was, he visited her, dropping everything he was currently doing. What was said in the room is not known, but he left the room with tears streaming down his face. He instructed those in charge of the villa where she was staying to do everything possible to meet her needs and wishes. People close to her said there was no doubt she loved him until her death. Her last words were Rossini's name. When she died, he paid for a marble statue-like headstone to be put up in her memory and buried her next to her father's tomb in his family's plot, with himself eventually being buried next to her. He quickly sold the villa she died in, too heartbroken to even enter the house after her death.

== Compositions ==
Colbran composed four collections of songs, each collection dedicated to an important influence to her: two of the Queens of Spain, the Empress of Russia, and one of her teachers, Crescentini. Using her theatrical background as a guide, her compositions often included dramatic elements that used Word painting and offered refinement and a deep sense of character. For musical and lyrical emphasis, she often added embellishments and fermatas to enhance repeated figures, usually prior to the return of the initial melodic statement. She would use harp and/or piano as accompaniment with all of her compositions.

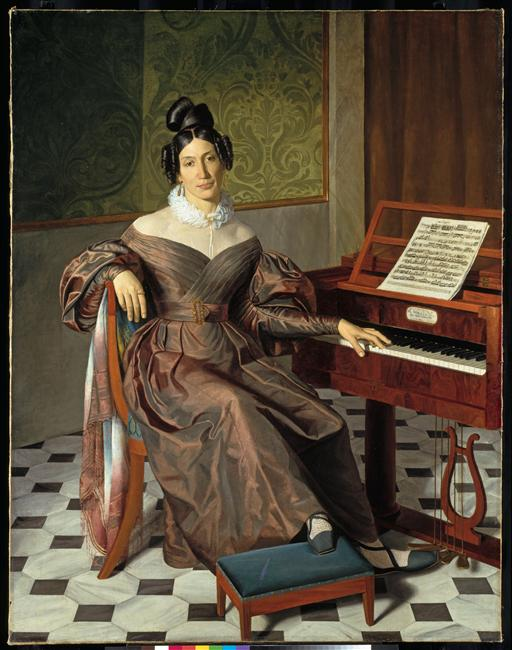
Isabella Colbran; portrait by Johann Baptist Reiter (c. 1835)

=== List of compositions ===
- Cavatina di partenza (Dedicated to Gaetanl Marinelli and Girolamo Crecentini)
- Sei canzoncine ou petits airs italiens avec traduction française et accompagnement de piano ou harpe (published by Magazin de Musique):
  - Première recueil (Dedicated to the Queen of Spain, Maria Luisa of Parma)
    - 1. Povero cor, tu palpiti
    - 2. Il piè s'allontana
    - 3. Benché ti sia crudel
    - 4. Per costume, o mio bel
    - 5. Vorrei che almen per gioco
    - 6. Chi sa qual core
  - Deuxième recueil (Dedicated to the Empress of Russia, Elizaveta Alekseyevna)
    - 7. La speranza al cor mi dice
    - 8. Ad onta del fato
    - 9. T'intendo, sì, mio cor
    - 10. Ch'io mai vi possa lasciar d'amare
    - 11. Voi siete, o luci belle
    - 12. Mi lagnerò tacendo
  - Troisième recueil (Dedicated to the past Queen of Spain, Julie Clary)
    - 13. Ombre amene, amiche piante
    - 14. Quel cor che mi prometti
    - 15. Più bella aurora
    - 16. So che un sogno è la speranza
    - 17. Se son lontano
    - 18. Quel ruscelletto che l'onde chiare
  - Quatrième recueil (Dedicated to Girolamo Crecentini)
    - 19. Placido zeffiretto
    - 20. Amo-te solo
    - 21. Vanne felice rio
    - 22. Vanne al mio sene
    - 23. Sempre più t'amo
    - 24. Voi siete o luci belle

== Notes and references ==
Notes
