= Rodolphe (comics writer) =

French comics writer (1948–2026)

- Rodolphe in 2010
- Born: Rodolphe Daniel Jacquette; 18 May 1948; Bois-Colombes, France
- Died: 22 September 2026 (aged 78); Colombes, France
- Occupation: Comics writer

Rodolphe Daniel Jacquette (18 May 1948 – 22 September 2026), known professionally as Rodolphe, was a French comics writer. A recipient of the Jacques-Lob Prize, he was best known for his work on the series Comanche, Kenya, Amazonia, Namibia, Cliff Burton and Das Reich. He made six comic albums in collaboration with the illustrator Griffo, the last of which was Chagrin from 2026.

Jacquette died of a cardiac arrest in Colombes, on 22 September 2026, at the age of 78.
