= Bust of Auguste Rodin (Bourdelle) =

1910 sculpture by Antoine Bourdelle

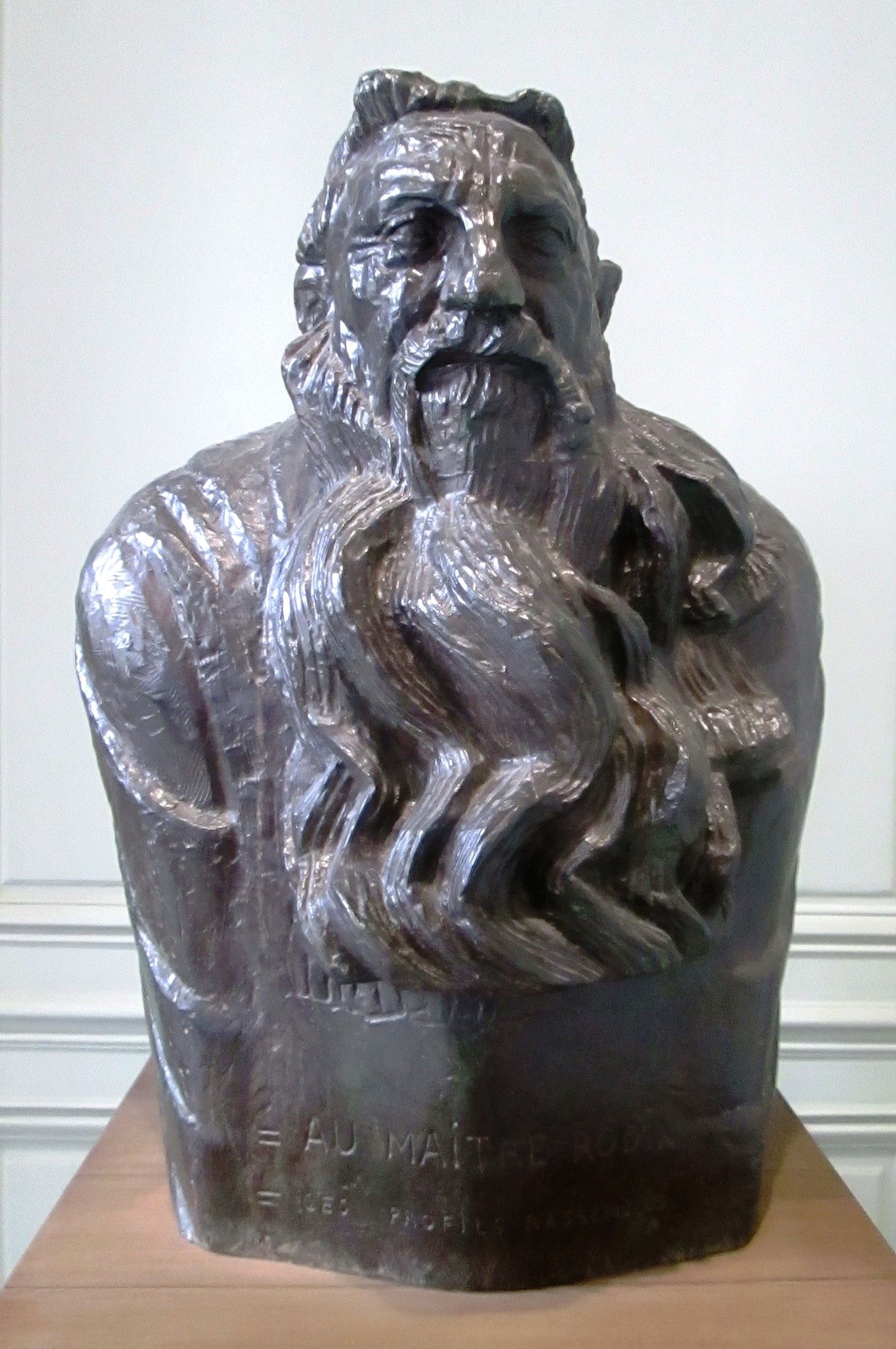
- Bronze cast of the bust at the Musée Rodin
- Artist: Antoine Bourdelle
- Year: 1909-10
- Medium: bronze
- Dimensions: 89.5 cm (35.2 in)

The Bust of Auguste Rodin is a totemic portrait originally moulded in clay in 1909 by the French artist Antoine Bourdelle. The artist's teacher and associate, Auguste Rodin, is portrayed as a sacred icon with the visage and horns of Michelangelo's Moses. A bronze cast of a modified version was displayed in the 1910 Salon de la Société Nationale des Beaux–Arts on the Champ de Mars along with his Hercules the Archer.

== See also ==
- List of works by Antoine Bourdelle
- Bust of Auguste Rodin (Claudel)
