= Hercules the Archer =

1909 sculpture by Antoine Bourdelle

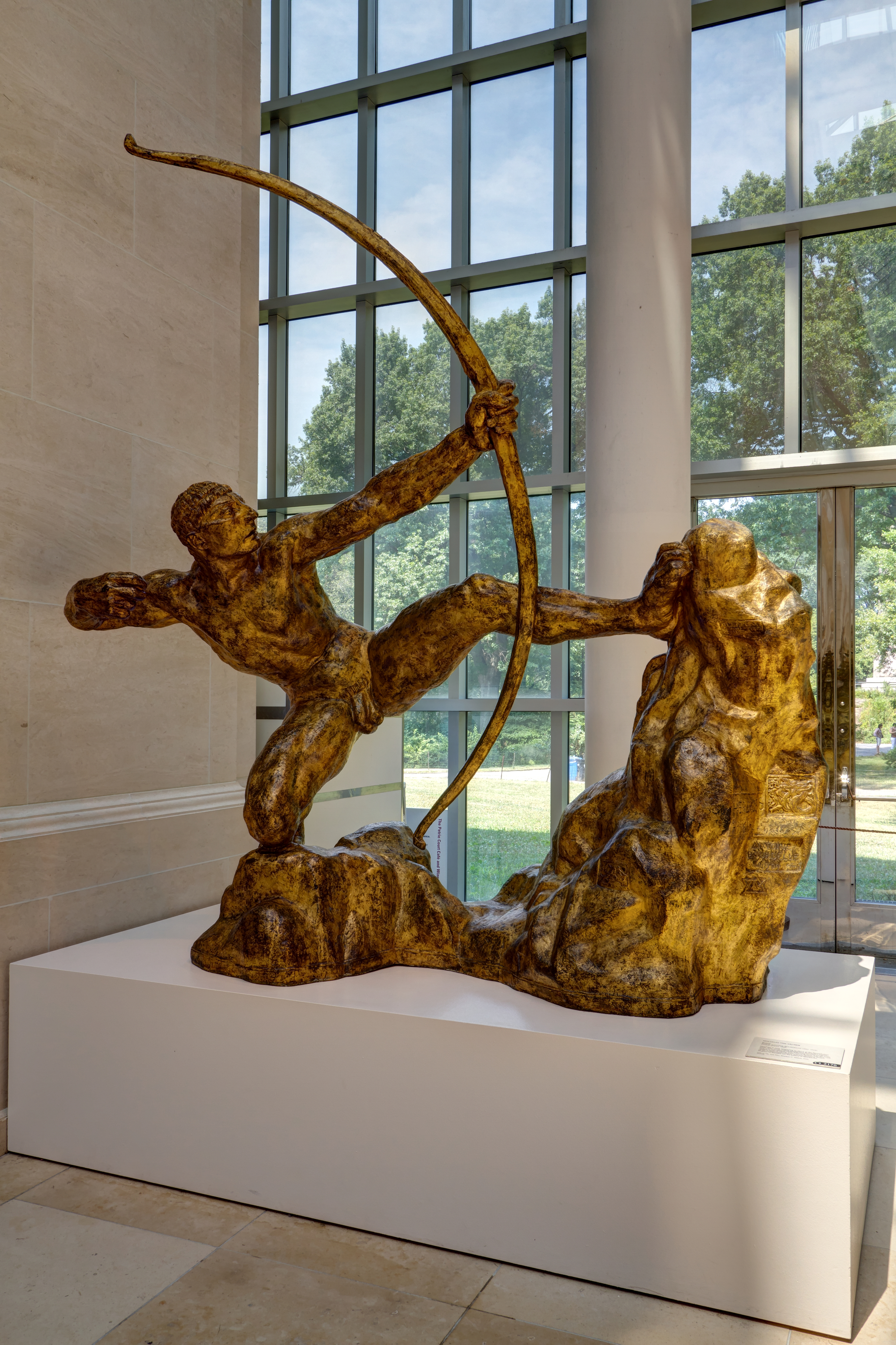
Hercules the Archer in the Metropolitan Museum of Art, New York, gilt-bronze

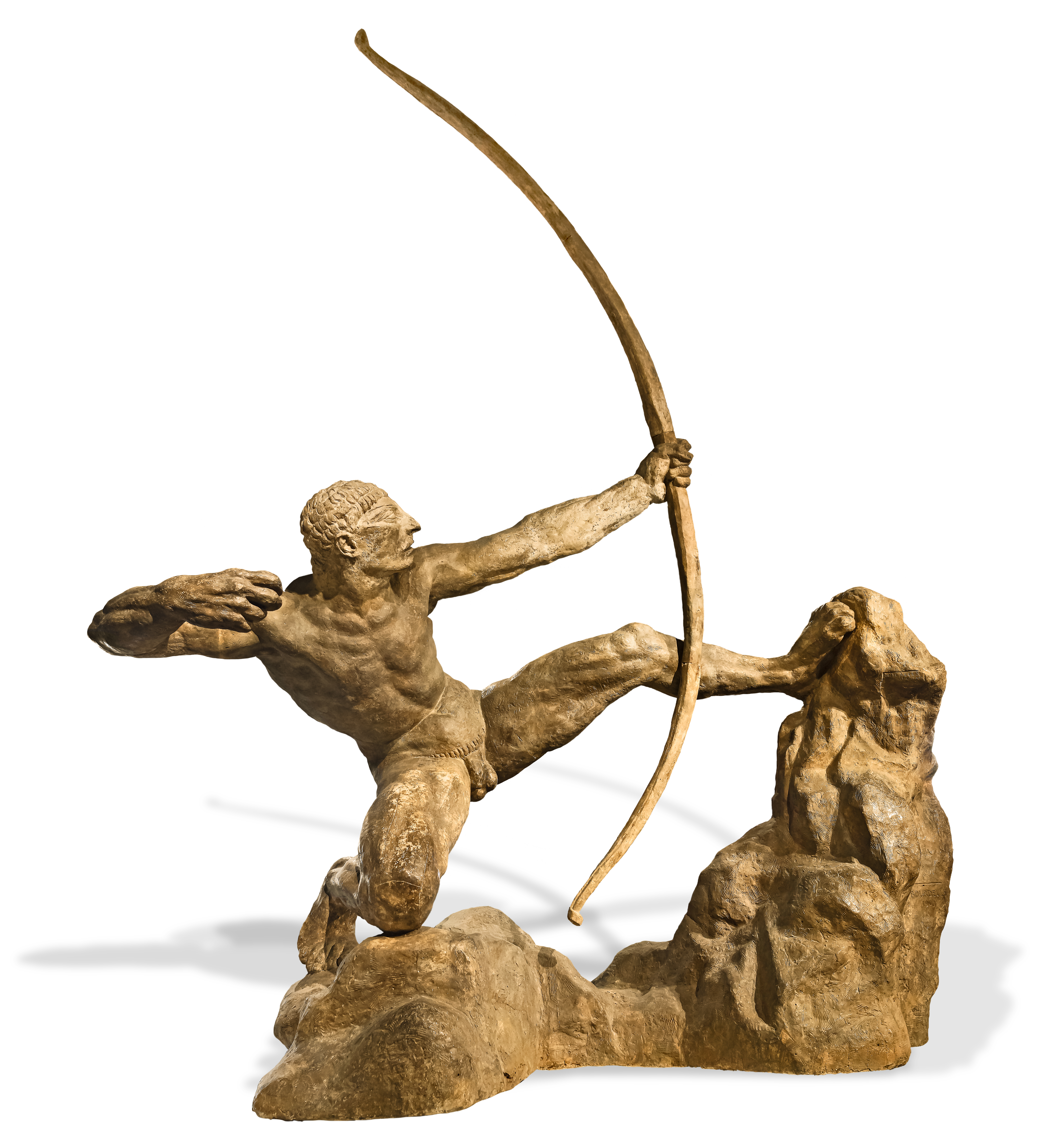
Hercules the Archer, plaster, Musée Ingres, Montauban

Hercules the Archer (1909) is a sculpture by Antoine Bourdelle which now exists in multiple versions. It was commissioned by financier and philanthropist Gabriel Thomas in April 1909, as a unique work. Bourdelle modeled it in clay over the summer of 1909, for which his friend Paul Gustave André Doyen-Parigot, a captain in the French Army, posed. The sculpture was cast in gilt-bronze by Eugène Rudier, and exhibited at the National Society of Fine Arts in 1910. Its dimensions are 2.50 m × 2.40 m.

The second version was developed around 1923. It differed from the first version with additions of reliefs on the rock right, representing the Lernaean Hydra and the Nemean Lion. Finally a banner along the base of the sculpture and the monogram completed the work.

== Background ==
3D model of Antoine Bourdelle's statue, Herakles the Archer.

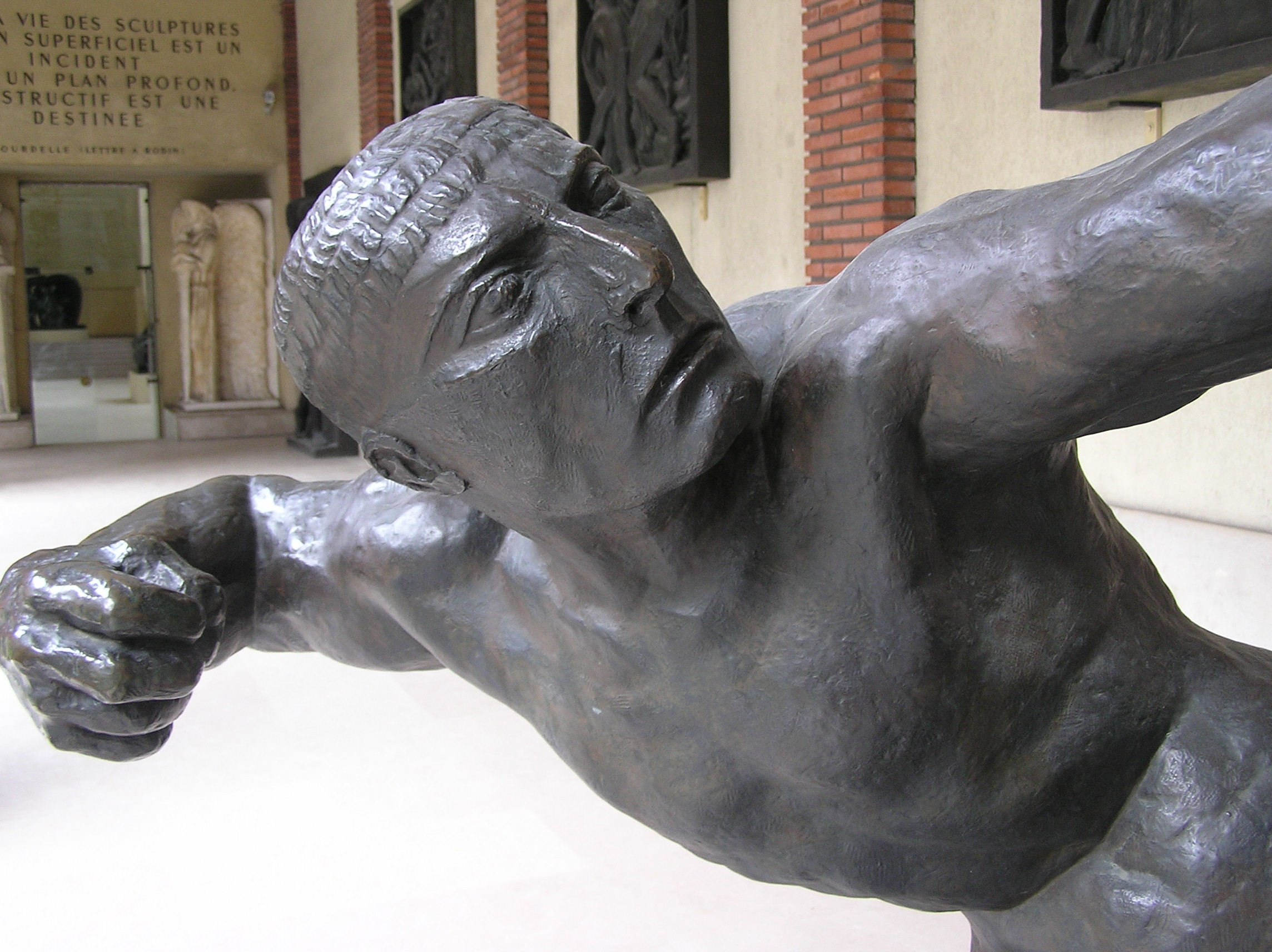
Detail, Musée Antoine Bourdelle, Paris

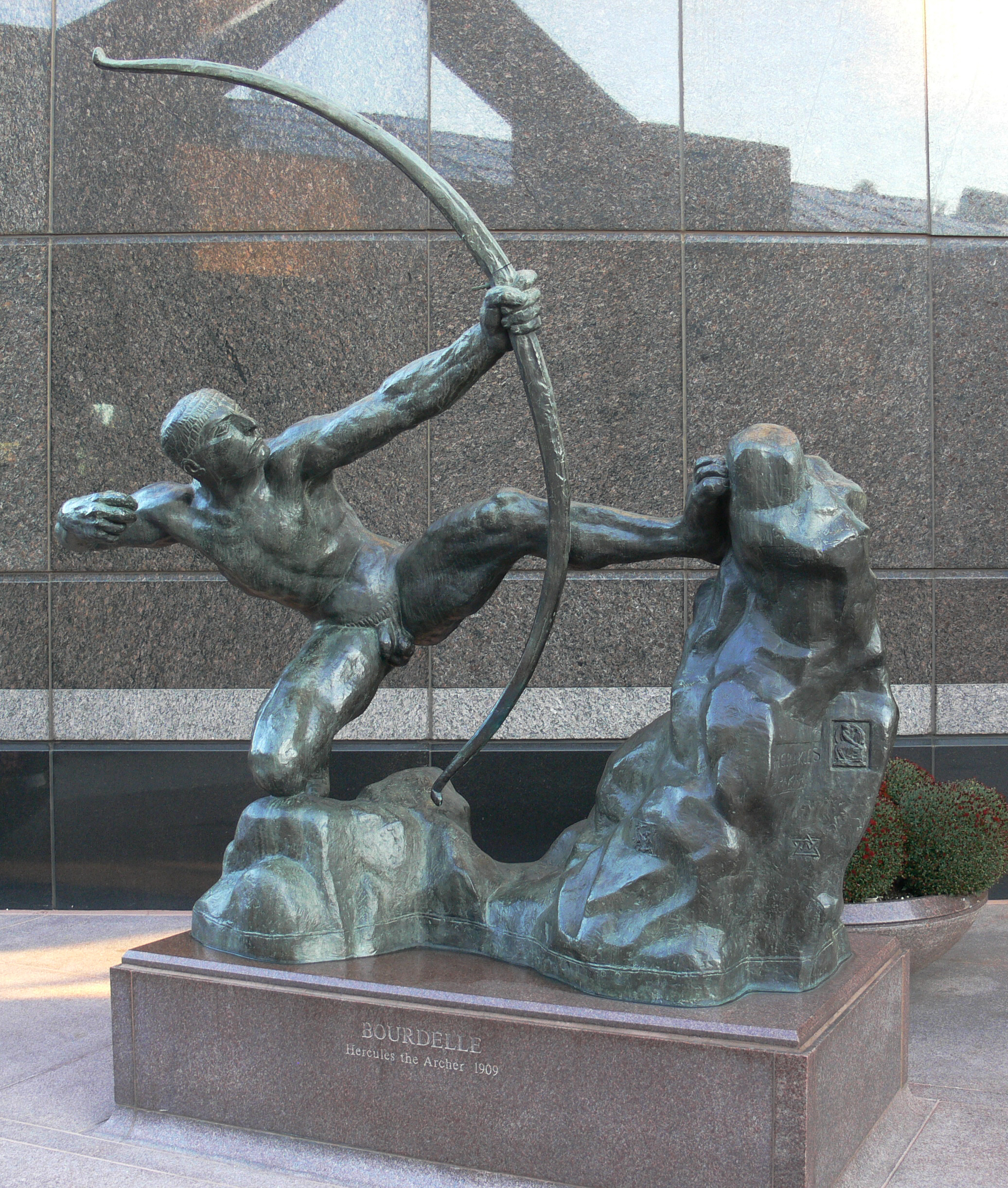
Copy at Trammell Crow Center sculpture garden, Dallas, Texas

Bourdelle was inspired by the Labours of Hercules, and chose the sixth of them: the extermination of the Stymphalian birds. In the Greek mythology, the birds of this lake were monstrous in size, feeding on human flesh, which infested the woods surrounding the lake Stymphale, in Arcadia. Using their sharp-pointed feathers bronze (according to one of several versions) as arrows, to kill men and beasts, and devour them.

For the creation of this work, Antoine Bourdelle asked his friend the captain Doyen-Parigot (1854–1916), whom he had met at the "Saturday Rodin" to pose for him. This military man was an accomplished sportsman. The deployment of the body and muscle tension required by archery highlight the muscles of the model. Bourdelle modified the head of the model at the request of his friend who had requested for anonymity.

Bourdelle did several studies to produce a small sculpture, which he considered as completed in 1909. During the visit to his workshop, the patron Gabriel Thomas was fascinated by this sculpture and commissioned a monumental sculpture for the garden of his home in Bellevue.

== International success ==
In 1914, Antoine Bourdelle became aware of the injury suffered because of the exclusivity granted to Gabriel Thomas. Indeed, after the Venice Biennale where Bourdelle had presented a cast of Hercules the Archer, he was forced to refuse to sell a bronze statue. Seeing Bourdelle's disappointment, Thomas agreed to end his exclusivity and allow Bourdelle to make further copies. The first new sculpture went to Sweden in 1920. Thereafter, Thomas made a new bronze which remained in his family until it was sold in 1991 to Drouot-Montaigne, this work is now in Tokyo.

After Thomas' agreement to concede his rights, a copy was given in 1916 to the Gallery of Modern Art in Rome. In 1920, the museum Waldemarsudde of Stockholm bought the first copy of Thomas. In 1923, copies were sold to museums in Brussels, Prague and New York. In 1925, the city of Toulouse provided a Hercules statue for its sports museum. In 1926, the Musée du Luxembourg in Paris bought a Hercules (it is now at the Musée d'Orsay). In 1927, the Musée des Beaux-Arts de Lyon had a copy in turn. There are now a number of further versions in museums and cities.

Adolphe Willette made a caricature of the statue.

=== Belgium ===
- Antwerp, Middelheim museum, Nachtegalen Park

=== France ===
- Paris, Musée Bourdelle, Musée d'Orsay and Gare Montparnasse
- Montauban, musée Ingres
- Toulouse, place Héraklès
- Lyon, Musée des Beaux-Arts de Lyon
- Égreville, Jardin-musée Bourdelle d'Égreville

=== Germany ===
- Cologne, University of Cologne

=== Asia ===
- Tokyo, Japan, National Museum of Western Art (NMWA), Bridgestone Museum of Art and Tokyo Fuji Art Museum
- Hakone, Japan, Hakone Open Air Museum

=== America ===
- Buenos Aires, Argentina, in a garden of the quarter Recoleta (the statue is named El arquero)
- New Orleans, Louisiana, Sydney and Walda Besthoff Sculpture Garden, New Orleans Museum of Art
- New York, U.S., Metropolitan Museum of Art
- Los Angeles, U.S., Los Angeles County Museum of Art
- New York, U.S., Syracuse University Quad

== Photos ==
=== The studies ===
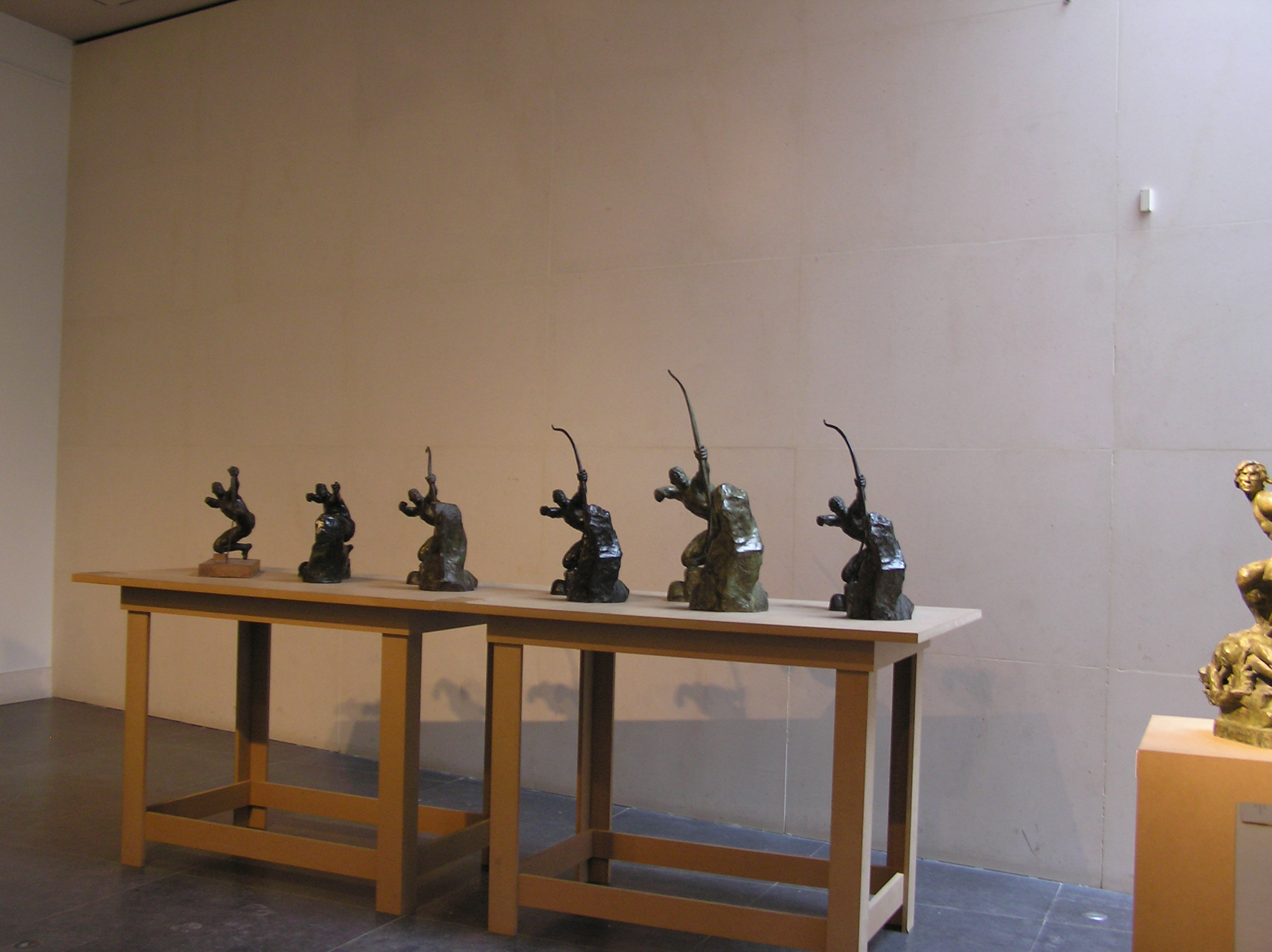
The six studies of 1909

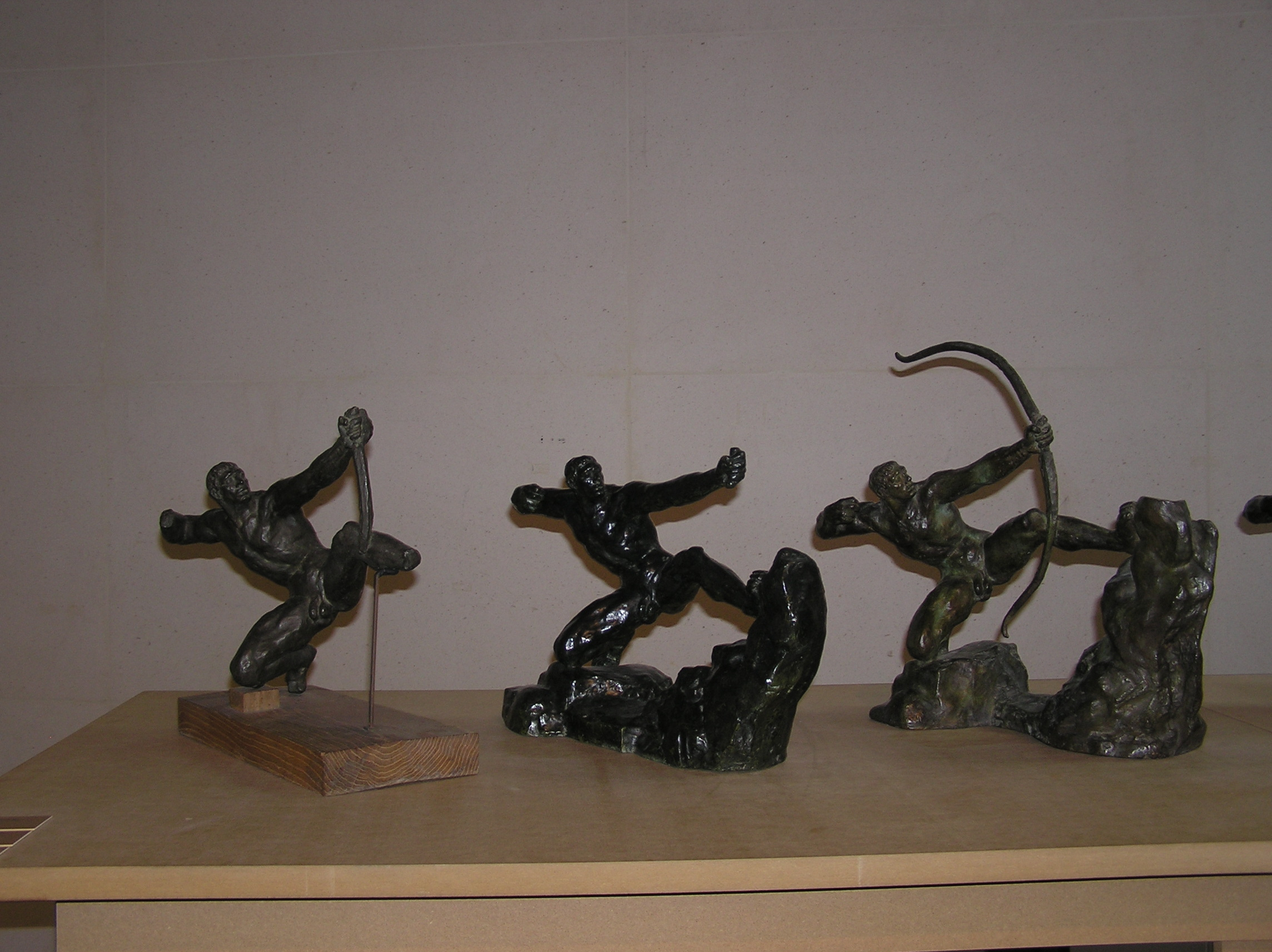
The first three studies

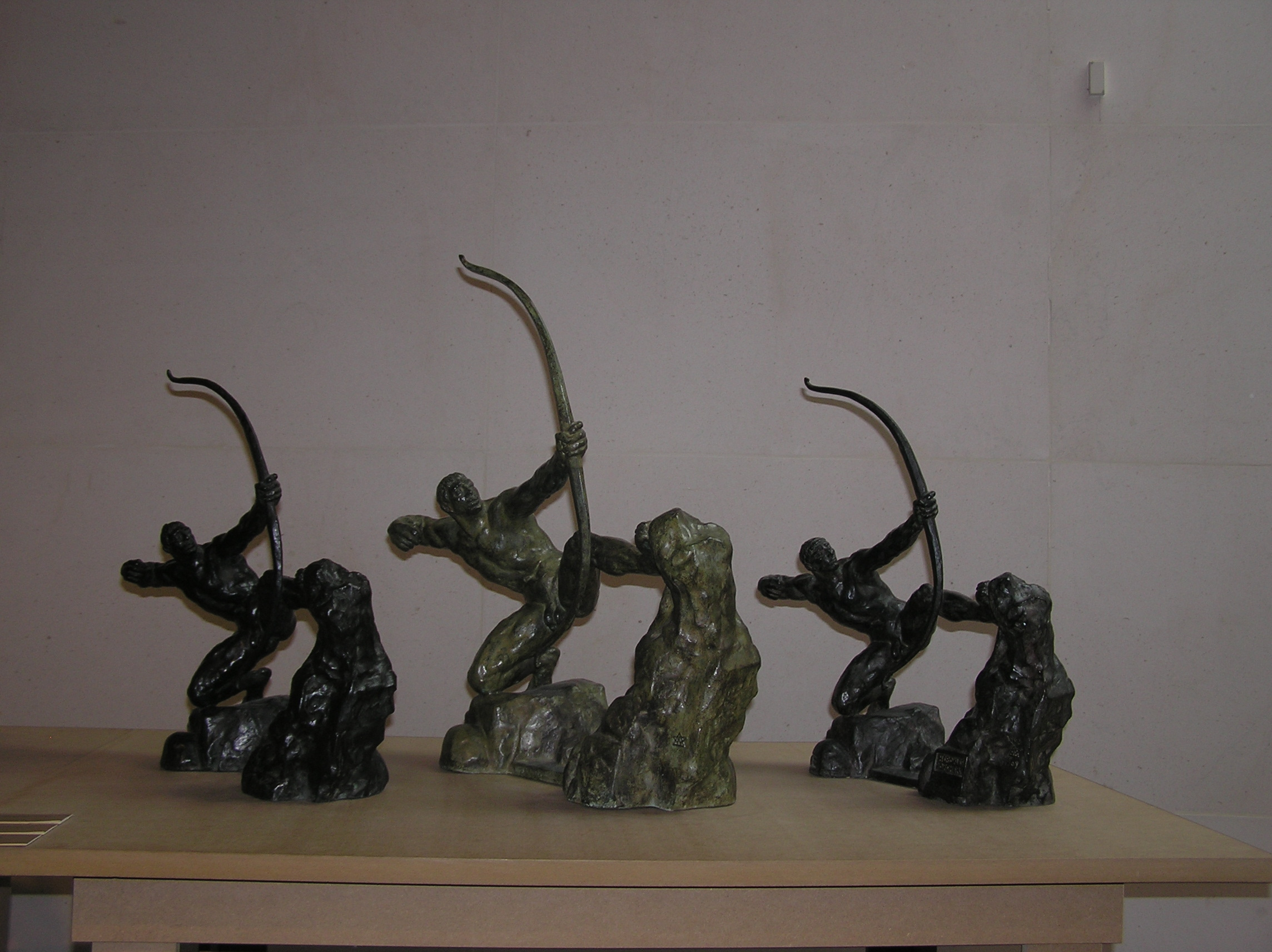
The next studies

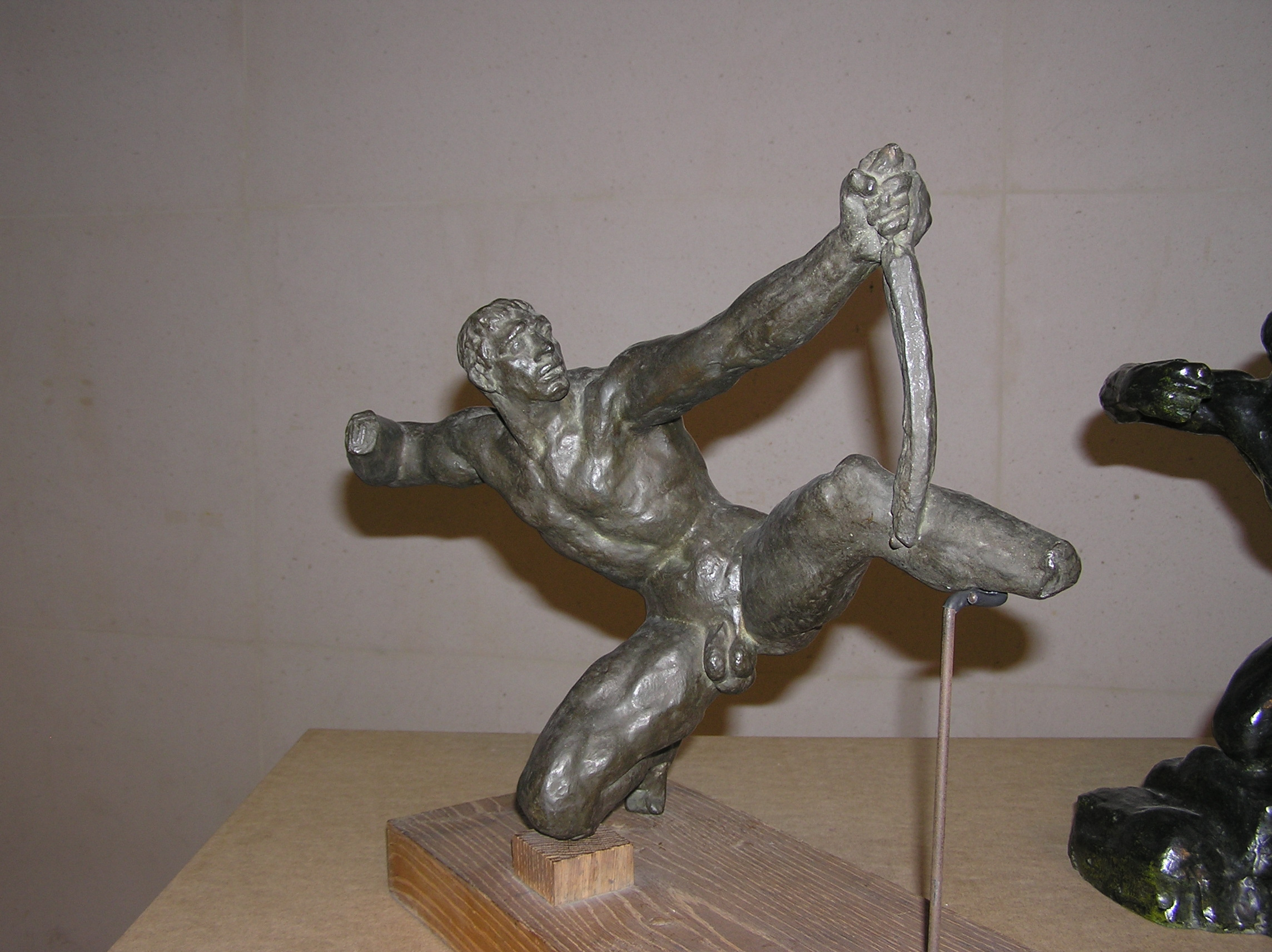
The first study

=== The copies of the statue ===
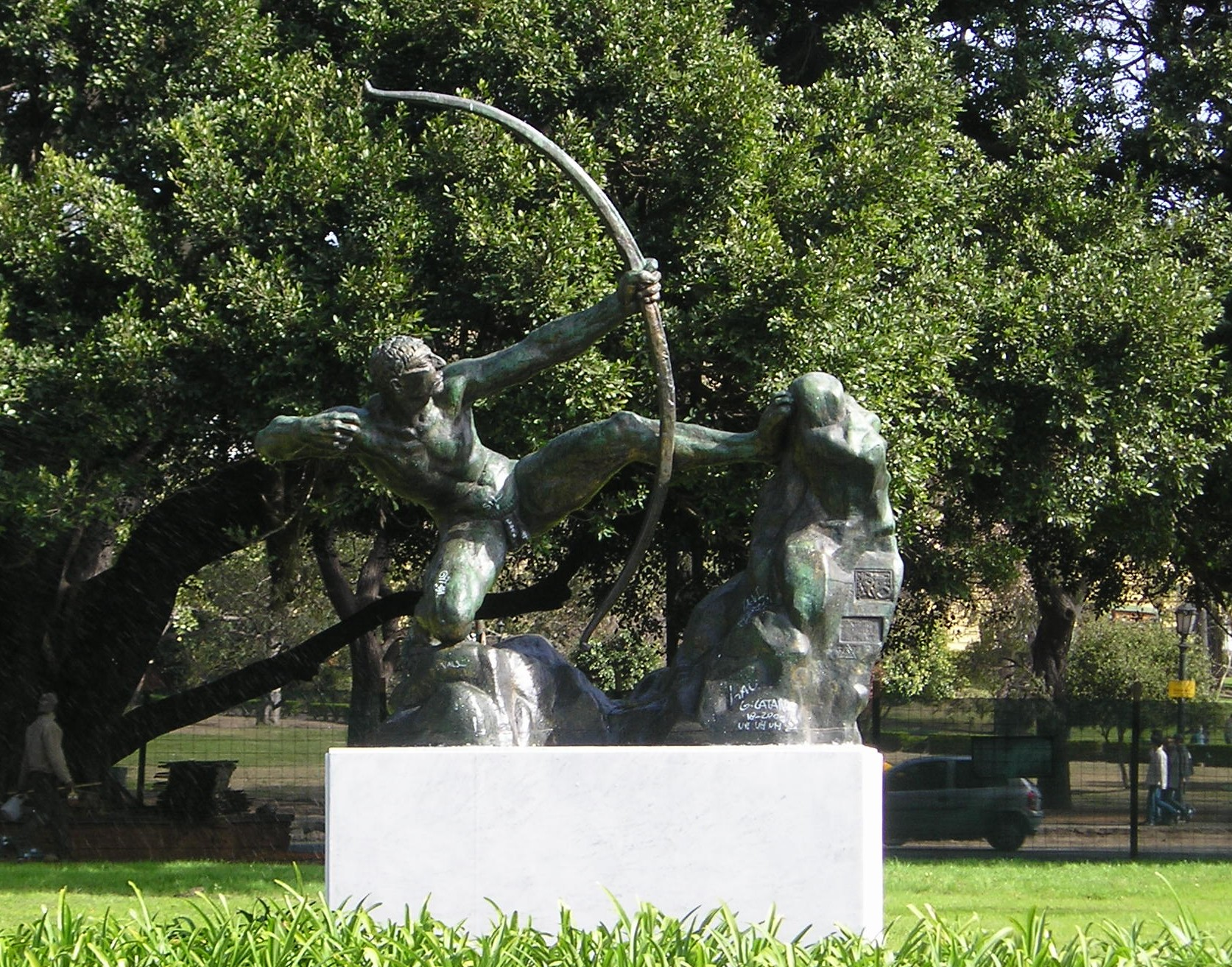
El arquero in Buenos Aires, bronze

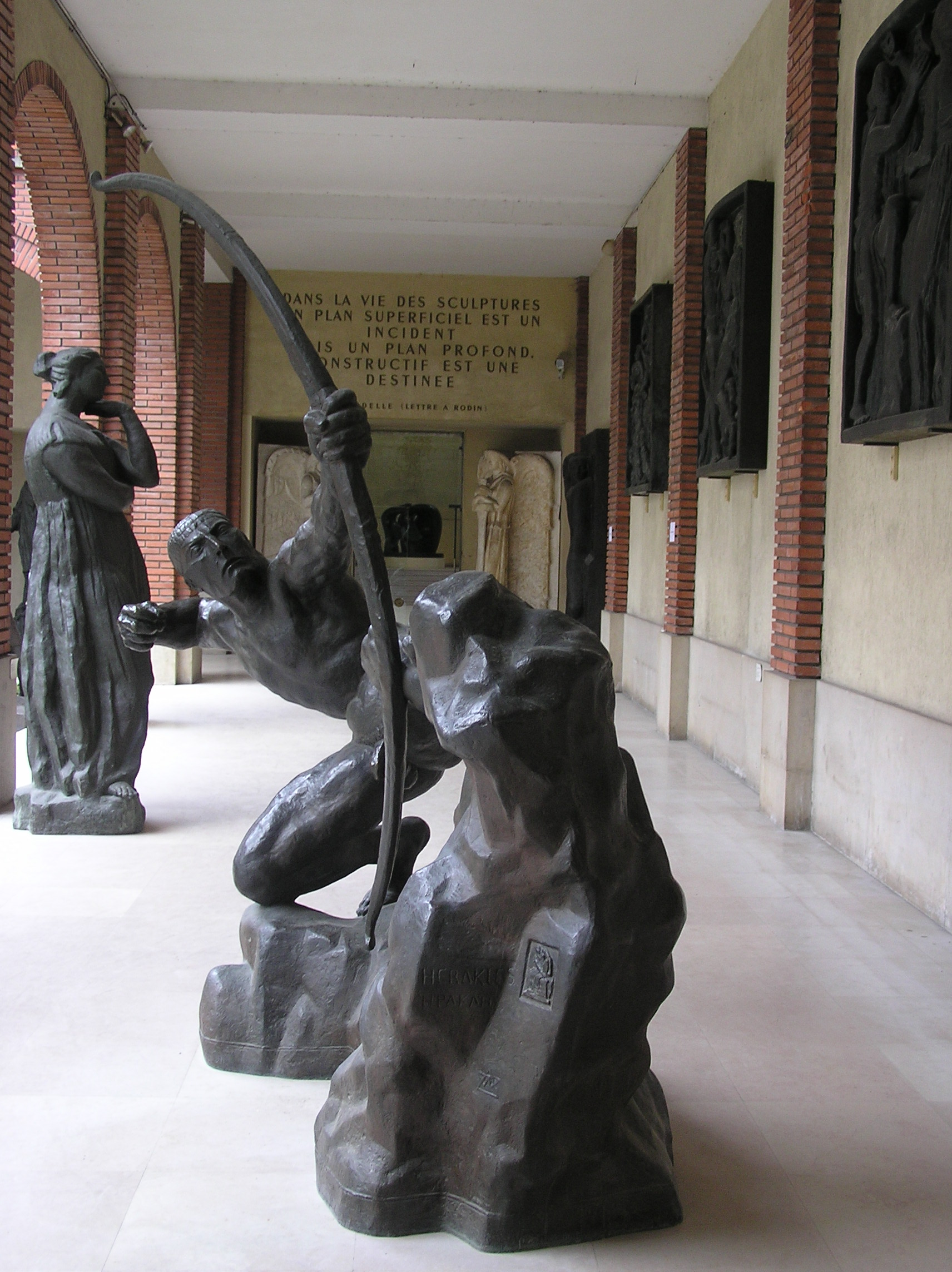
Hercules the Archer, bronze, Musée Bourdelle in Paris

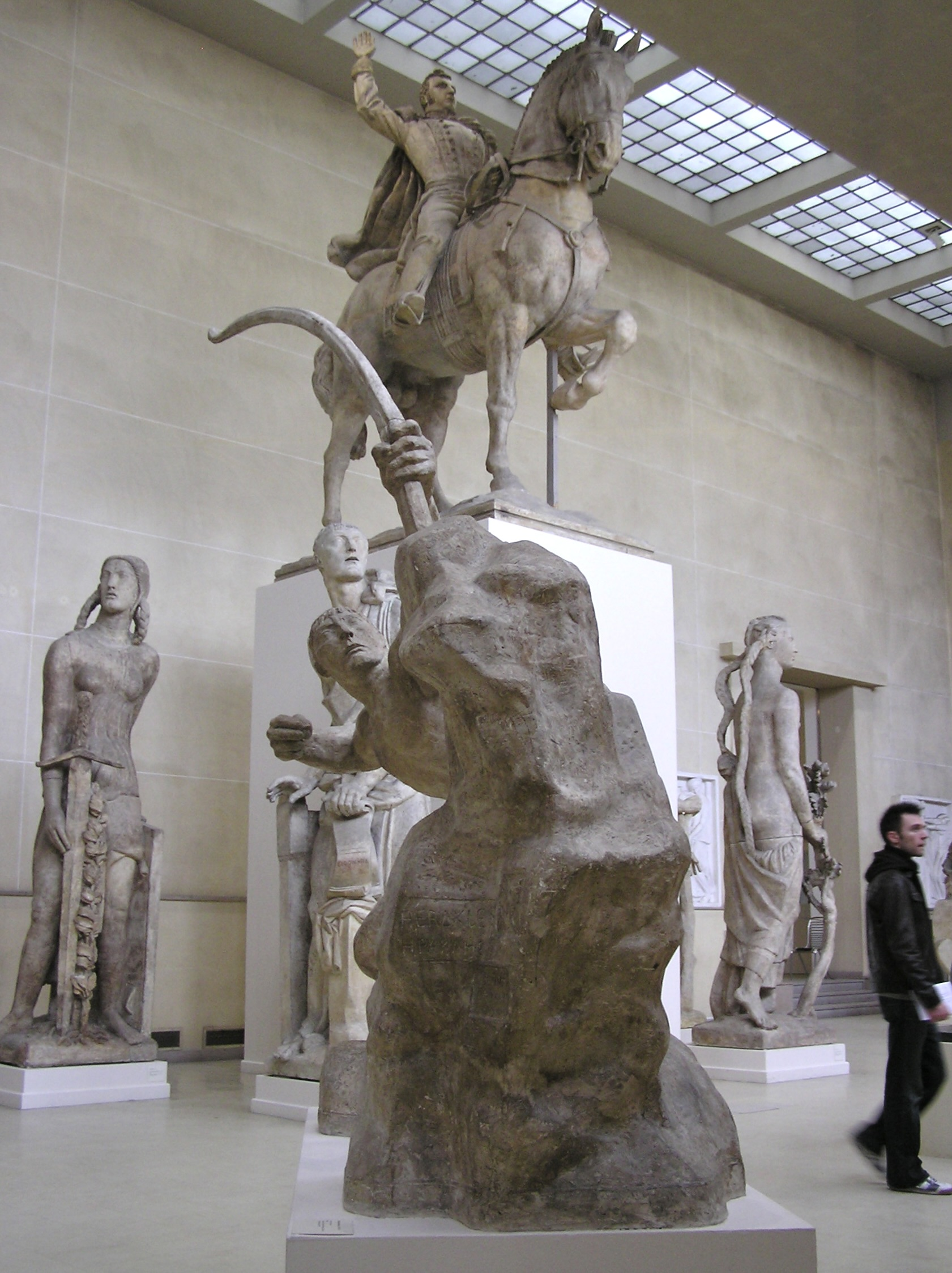
Hall of the plasters of the Musée Bourdelle in Paris

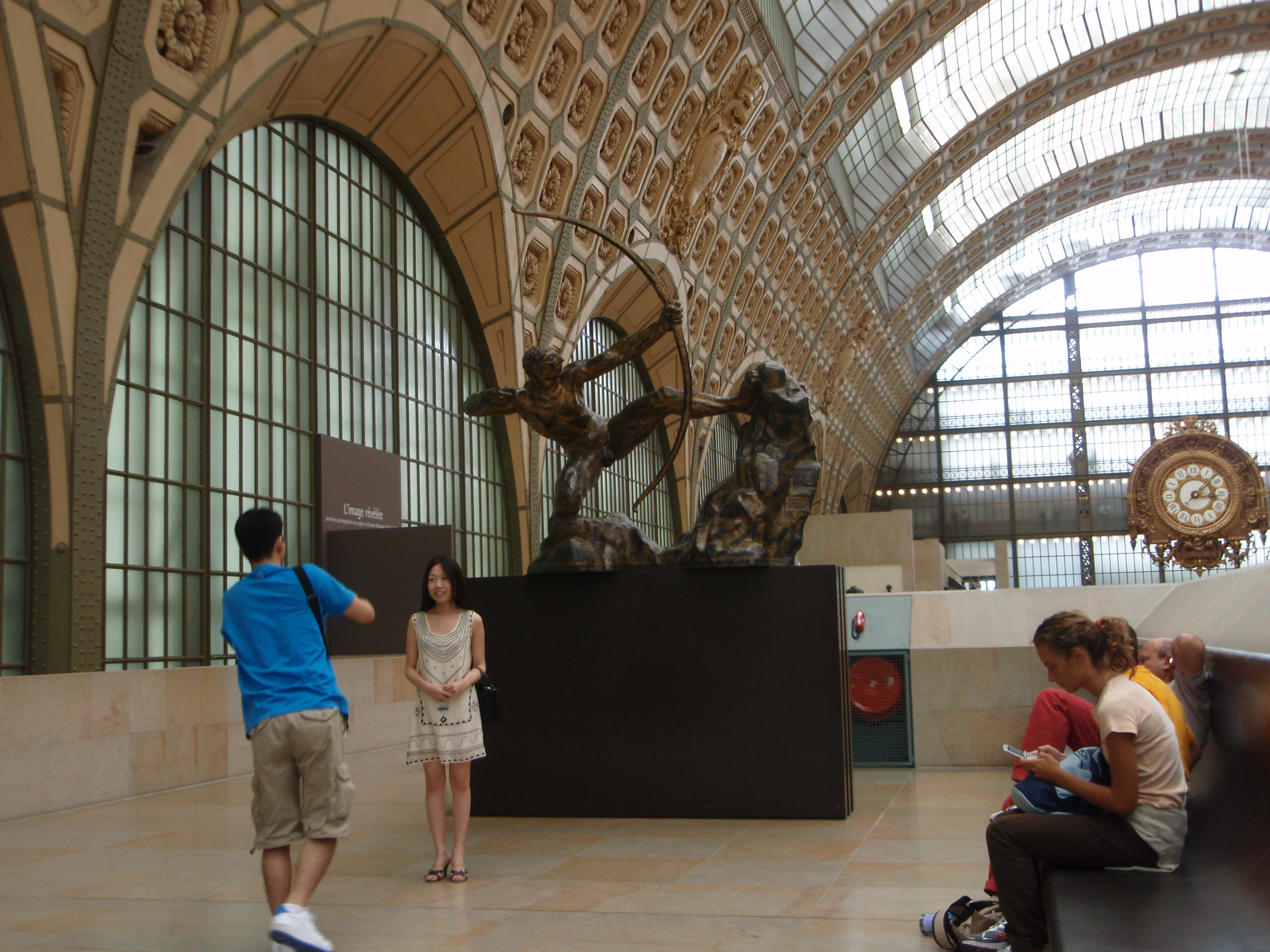
Hercules the Archer in Paris, Musée d'Orsay

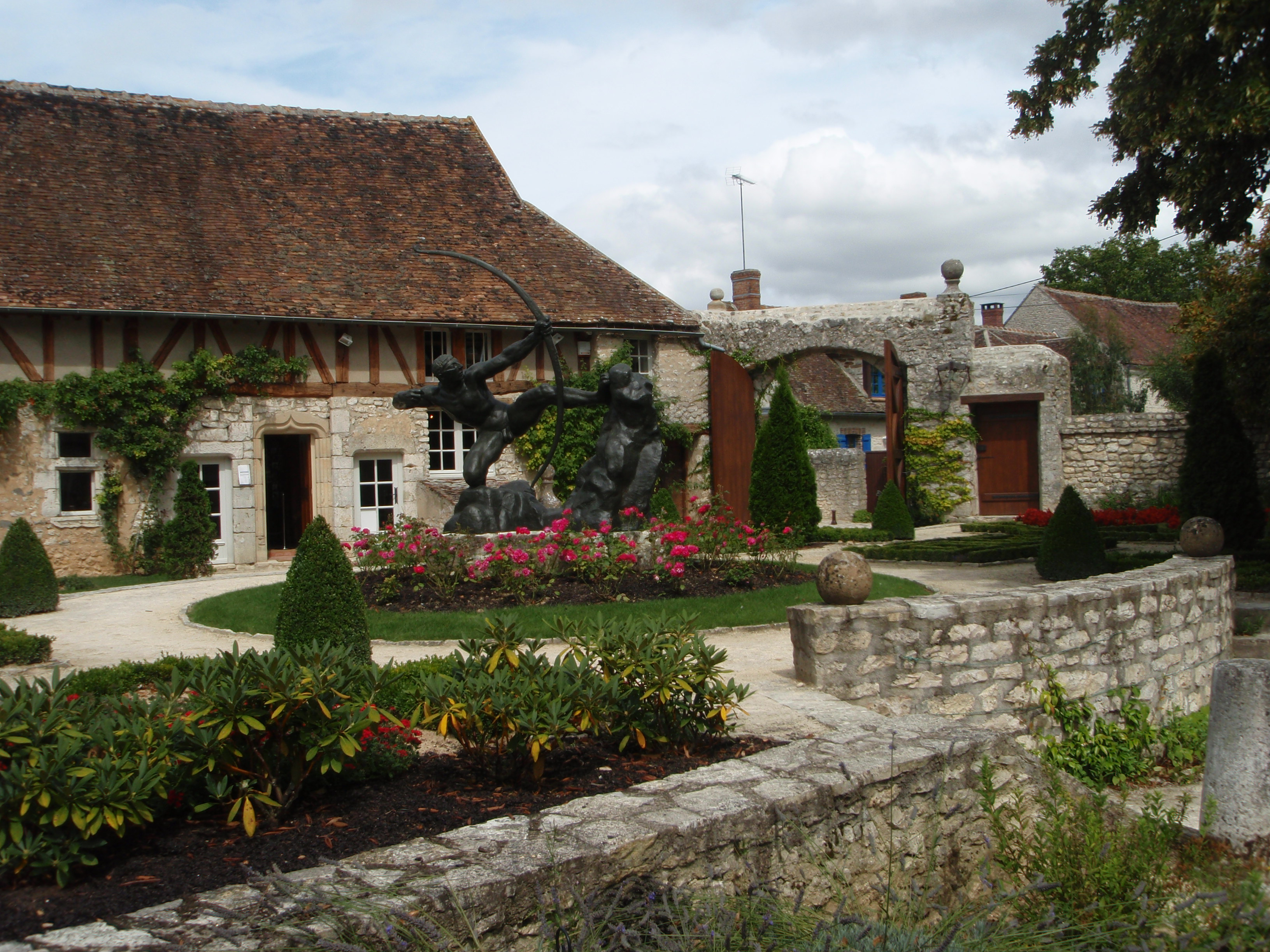
Hercules the Archer, Jardin-Musée Bourdelle, bronze

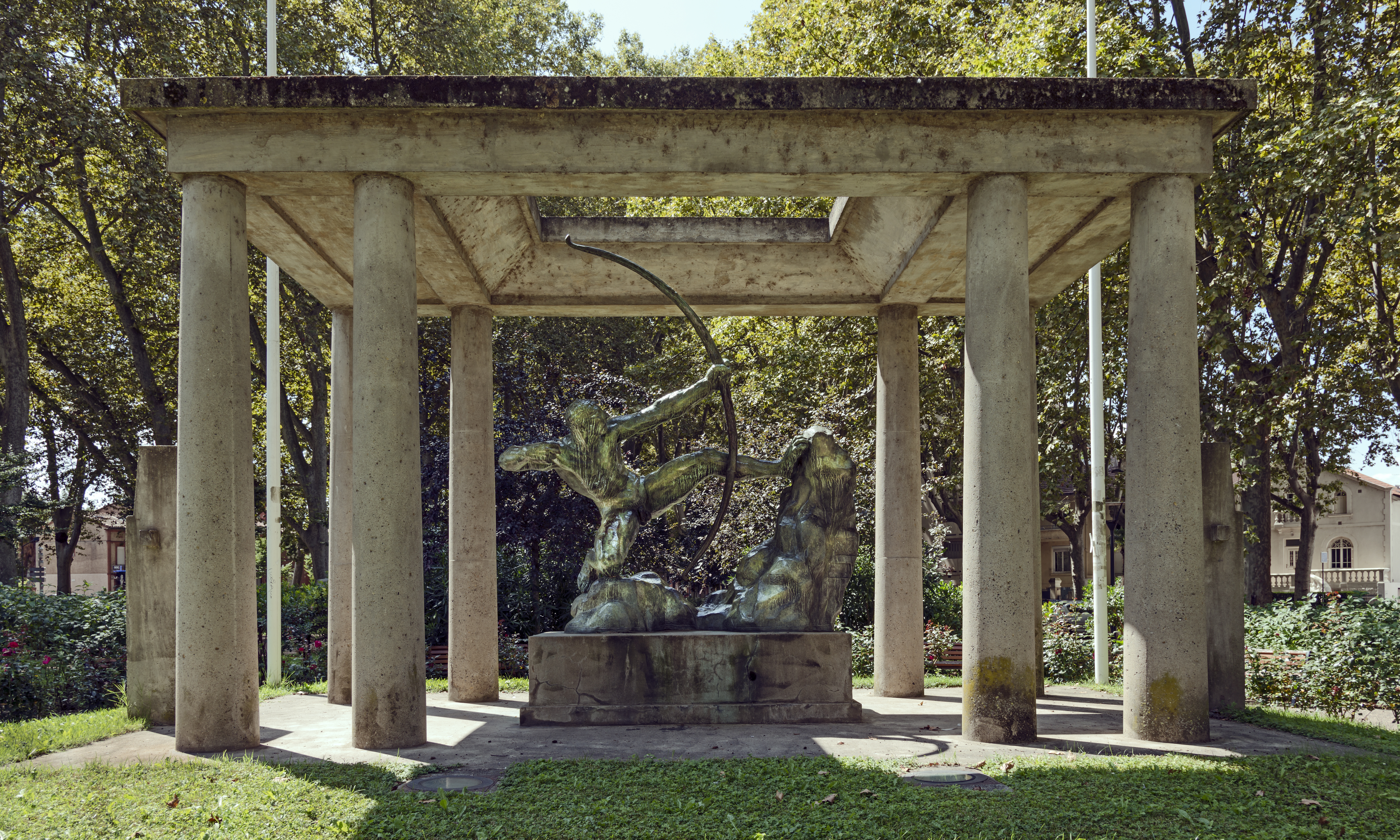
Hercules the Archer in Toulouse

== See also ==
- List of works by Antoine Bourdelle

== Bibliography ==
- Dossier de l'Art N° 10 de January/February 1993
- Bourdelle by Ionel Jianou and Michel Dufet Edition Arted 1970
- Jardin-musée départemental Bourdelle d'Égreville by Hervé Joubeaux – Conservateur territorial du Patrimoine, May 2005 (ISBN 2-9524413-0-8)
