= The Great Warrior of Montauban =

Public sculpture by Antoine Bourdelle

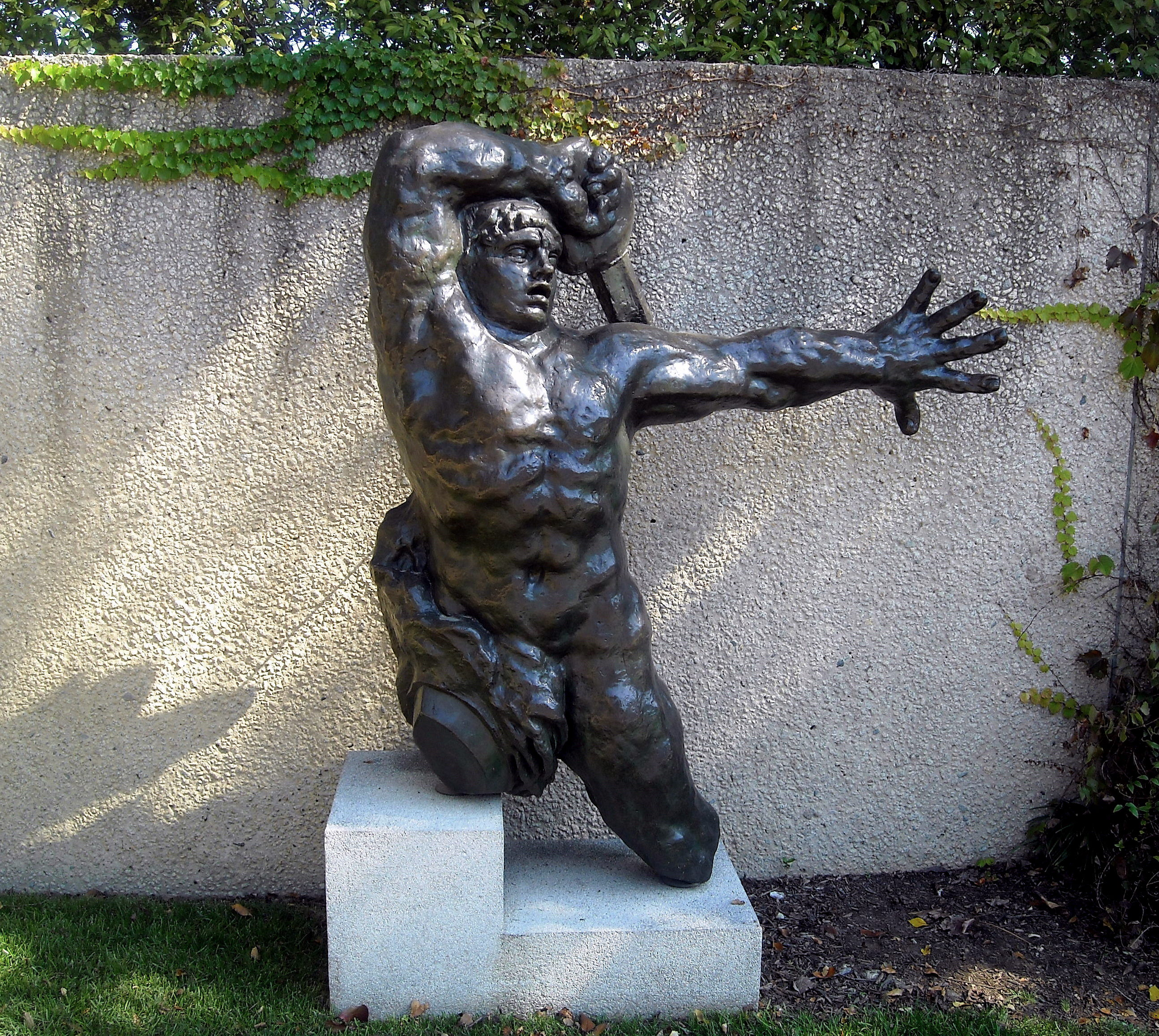
- Sculpture in 2008
- Artist: Antoine Bourdelle
- Year: 1898-1900
- Type: Bronze
- Dimensions: 186.1 cm × 157.5 cm × 61.3 cm (73 1/4 in × 62 in × 24 1/8 in)

The Great Warrior of Montauban is a bronze sculpture by Antoine Bourdelle.

It was commissioned in 1897, by the village of Montauban to commemorate the Franco-Prussian War. It was modeled in 1898 to 1900, and cast in 1956.

It is an edition of ten; number three is at the Hirshhorn Museum and Sculpture Garden. It appeared in LIFE magazine.

== See also ==
- List of works by Antoine Bourdelle
- List of public art in Washington, D.C., Ward 2
