= List of works by Antoine Bourdelle =

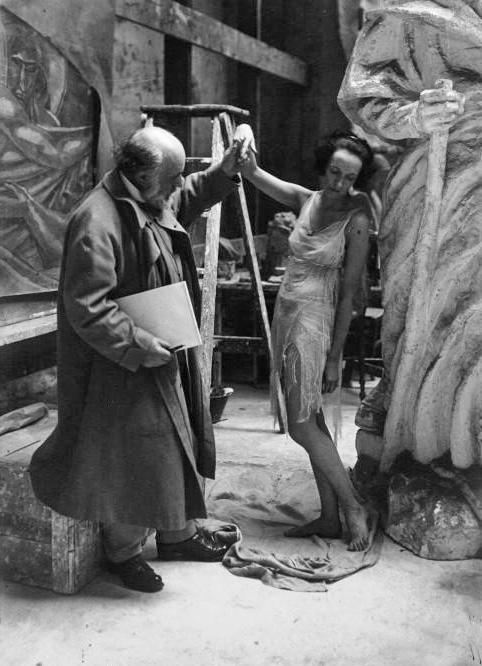
Antoine Bourdelle and American dancer Grace Christie, 1925

The following is an incomplete list of artworks by the French artist Antoine Bourdelle.

Antoine Bourdelle (31 October 1861 – 1 October 1929), born Émile Antoine Bordelles, was an influential and prolific French sculptor, painter, and teacher. His studio became the Musée Bourdelle, an art museum dedicated to his work, located at 18, rue Antoine Bourdelle, in the 15th arrondissement of Paris, France.

In 1905, he mounted an exhibition of his work at the Galerie Hébrard in Paris, showing 38 sculptures, 18 paintings and 21 drawings. The sculptures included La Nonne from 1888 as well as the Head of Apollo and his Great Tragic Mask of Beethoven. Bourdelle's father died in 1906 and in 1909 he left Rodin's studio. The year 1910, saw his Héraklès tue les oiseaux du lac Stymphale of 1909 shown at the Salon and this was a huge success! A version of this work is held in the Musée d'Orsay. Whilst working as a sculptor he also taught at the Académie de la Grande Chaumière in Montparnasse, his pupils including Alberto Giacometti, Aristide Maillol, René Iché and Germaine Richier. 1910 also saw his divorce from Stéphanie Van Parys and in 1911 Rhodia Bourdelle was born to him and Cléopâtre Sévastos. In 1913 an exhibition of modern art in New York included his Héraklès and Tête d’Apollon, the commission for the monument to Genéral Alvéar in Argentina was formalized and he carried out the sculptures for the Théâtre des Champs-Elysées. He founded and was vice president of the Salon des Tuileries.

Many works by Bourdelle can be seen in the Musée Bourdelle- Buste de Beethoven, Adam, Le bélier rétif, Centaure mourant, La Liberté and Vierge à l'enfant. From 1922 to 1923 he worked on La Vierge à l’offrande and completed the maquette for La France. He also completed La Naissance d’Aphrodite for the Marseille Opera House. In 1925 he exhibited at the Exposition internationale des Arts décoratifs showing Sappho, Le Livre and Masque de Bourdelle in the Pavillon du livre. 1926 finally saw his Alvéar monument inaugurated after 10 years of work and a version of La France was exhibited at the Salon des Tuileries. 1928 saw a retrospective exhibition to celebrate the inauguration of the Brussels Palais des Beaux-Arts and 1929, the year of his death, saw the Monument to Adam Mickiewicz inaugurated. Bourdelle died on the 1 October 1929 at Vésinet whilst a guest of the founder Rudier. In 1931 there was a great retrospective of Bourdelle's work at the Paris Orangerie. He is buried in Montparnasse cemetery. In 1924 he had been made Commandeur de l'Ordre de la Légion d'honneur.

== War memorials ==
Name	Location	Date	Notes
Monument aux Combattants et Défenseurs du Tarn-et-Garonne de 1870–71	Montauban	1893 to 1902	This monument dedicated to those men of the Tarn-et-Garonne region who gave their lives in the Franco-Prussian war was Bourdelle's first major commission. It had long been the practice in France to award commissions to local born artists but given his inexperience Bourdelle was fortunate to be approached as early as 1893 and finally chosen in 1897 for what was a most prestigious work. A maquette was submitted to the adjudicating committee and Bourdelle set about the commission, creating many plaster studies along the way as was his practice. He executed some 49 studies for the four heads involved, 34 in full size and submitted some to the Salon of the Société Nationale des Beaux-Arts- Dragon sur Rocher in 1897 and Figures Hurlantes in 1899. Many of the plaster casts involved were lost when on their return from a Belgian foundry, who had made several bronze casts, they were badly damaged; the foundry had sent them back by railway without adequate packaging/protection! Only the Grand Guerrier de Montauban could be restored. The complete monument was shown at the Salon of the Société Nationale des Beaux-Arts in 1902 and finally erected in that year. The composition moved away from that traditionally used for such memorials. Louis Gillet the art critic described the work as a "tumultuous mass" which seems wholly appropriate but many critics were scathing in their comments. One critic described the work as "A Hottentot horror...denying the laws of anatomy" Bourdelle had moved away from the banality of the usual war memorial compositions with wounded soldiers in heroic poses and people with flags, etc., etc. and vividly shows the horror of war "Il a la vision de la mort brutale; ses têtes sont expressives, démentes..." "Monument aux Combattants et Défenseurs du Tarn-et-Garonne de 1870–71"
Toulouse War Memorial (monument aux morts)	Toulouse	1909	This memorial stands in the Place Héracles in Toulouse and is known as the Monument aux Sports. It uses Bourdelle's 1909 Hercules the Archer (Héraklès tue les oiseaux du lac Stymphale) as its centre-piece and was erected in memory of all those sportsmen who died in the 1914–18 war, including the Toulouse rugby player Alfred Mayssonnié. "Monument aux Sports"
La France	Briançon	1920–23	The bronze statue in Briançon is one of several castings of the Bourdelle work La France. It was after the 1914–18 war that a project was launched to create a sculpture to commemorate the 1917 entry of the United States of America into that war and the architects Ventre et Damour were asked to design it. The first thoughts were to erect the monument at the Pointe de Grave near where the Americans had disembarked in 1917 and the architects had the idea of constructing a lighthouse in front of which would be placed a colossal statue depicting France searching the horizon for a sight of the Americans. At first the commission to create the statue was given to Albert Bartholomé but he persuaded his colleague Bourdelle to accept it and Bourdelle had the first maquette ready in 1922. Meanwhile, the building of the lighthouse had gone ahead but consumed the major part of the funds allocated for the project, leaving little to fund Bourdelle moving to the next point. Bourdelle however managed to complete a version of the work but with a height of 4.5m, half the full size planned, which was shown at the 1923 Salon. The French State then asked Bourdelle to execute the statue in the full 9 metres height which was then cast in bronze and used to decorate the entrance to the Grand Palais at the 1925 Éxposition des Arts Décoratifs. Bourdelle based the central figure on Athena and she carries a lance and shield and wears a helmet. After the exhibition closed the sculpture was put into storage with the intention of using it at some future date as part of the project to build a Palais des Arts Décoratifs Modernes but whilst languishing in storage it was seen by Maurice Petsche, the Under Secretary of State for the Arts and the Parliamentary Deputy for Briançon, who acquired it for his town's war memorial where it was erected on a spot overlooking the Durance valley near Vauban's great fortress above the town. Another cast was made for the Montauban monument aux morts. The statue commemorating the entry of the Americans into the war was never erected by the lighthouse built in the Pointe de Grave and the lighthouse was in fact blown up by the Germans during the 1940s occupation. However, another bronze casting, 9 meter high, was made by Rudier, and this graced the terrace of Algier's Musée des Beaux-arts but in 1961 and just before Algerian independence, the monument, a symbol of France and Gaullism, was dynamited by the OAS. The fragments of Bourdelle's work were returned to France and the work was reassembled and can be seen in the Coëtquidan"Musée du Souvenir" at the École St-Cyr although the group of serpents which stood next to the figure of France in Bourdelle's original composition and part of the lance carried by the figure were lost. A fourth casting was carried out by the Hohwiller foundry and this was erected outside the Palais de Tokyo as part of a monument honouring the "Free French" and the "call" of 18 June 1940 by de Gaulle. See later entry. Bourdelle himself believed "La France" to be his greatest masterpiece. Casts of the 4.60m version are held by the Brooklyn Museum and others.
Montceau-les-Mines War memorial (monument aux morts)	Montceau-les-Mines	1924 to 1928	It was on the 17 November 1918, only days after the war had ended, that Montceau-les-Mines decided to erect a memorial to those 690 sons of Montceau-les-Mines who had lost their lives in the 1914–18 conflict. A competition was organized and the award decisions made. However, it was only many years later that the monument was erected for although the commission went to Bourdelle he did not like the designs proposed by the adjudicating committee and had his own ideas on the form the monument would take. Above all he wanted the monument to stress that the men honoured were from the mining industry. He began his work in 1919 and actually visited the mines to make studies. When the monument was completed in 1930 the sculptor had died, but what emerged was a unique monument which consists of a square pedestal on which sits a representation of a miner's lamp. The pedestal bears four bas-reliefs, executed between 1924 and 1928, each measuring 2.40m by 1.45m. One depicts three miners working in the pit using the tools which would have been used in the 1920s, including a lamp. Another shows a miner who has enlisted and is saying farewells to his mother, sister and/or wife. In the third, three sappers are shown in a tunnel fixing support shafts whilst in the final relief we have a dead soldier held in the arms of a winged angel who represents the motherland and wears a phrygian bonnet. In her hand she holds the soldier's medal. Below the bas-reliefs are lists of the dead, not just those from Monceau but also those from the neighbouring villages of Blanzy, Ciry, Gourdon, Saint-Bérain and Pouilloux. At a later date the names of those lost in the Second World War were added. In 1956, Bourdelle's monument appeared on a postage stamp in an engraving by Pierre Munier. The stamp celebrated the hundredth anniversary of the establishment of the mining town.
The National Monument of the Hartmannswillerkopf	Soultz-Haut-Rhin Hartmannswillerkopf Col-du-Silberloch	1922–24	The National Monument of the Hartmannswillerkopf was inaugurated on 9 October 1932 and is in fact a crypt carved from the mountain's bedrock. The entrance is approached by a cutting from the road and is flanked by two bronze over-life-size "Angels of Victory" by Bourdelle. Inside the crypt and covered by a large bronze shield is an ossuary which contains the remains of 12,000 unidentified soldiers. There are also Protestant and Jewish altars and a Catholic chapel. On the esplanade, which is situated above the crypt, is the Altar de la Patrie with the cast of the intermediate size of the work la Vierge à l'Offrande. Behind the monument is a French Military cemetery and ossuary.
War Memorial Montauban-monument aux morts	Montauban	1921	It was in 1919 that a committee was set up to organize Montauban's 1914–18 war memorial and the commission went to Bourdelle in 1921. The huge temple, an integral part of the monument, was not completed until 1930 and the inauguration until 1932 and, as he died in 1929, Bourdelle was not to see his sculpture "in situ". Bourdelle's statue, his La France (see entry above) is 9 metres high and stands before a white pillared temple like structure. In her right arm the female allegory has a long vertical lance whilst her left arm is raised in a gesture of victory. She carries a shield on which is depicted St Michel slaying the dragon (the victory of good over evil). This female allegory stands in front of the temple which is 20 metres high and has 12 pillars.
"Le monument de la France libre"-The monument to the "Free French"	Palais de Tokyo Paris	1948	This monument is dedicated to the Free French and stands outside the Palais de Tokyo. Bourdelle's allegory of La France has at her feet the words of Charles Péguy "Mère voici vos fils qui se sont tant battus" and below that the Cross of Lorraine, the symbol of the Free French movement, with the dedication "Aux volontaires des Forces Françaises Libres morts / pour l'honneur et la Liberté de la France / 18 juin 1940 - 8 mai 1945"
Capoulet-et-Junac War Memorial. (monument aux morts)	Capoulet-et-Junac		The three figures in Bourdelle's composition represent fear, suffering and death (la peur, la souffrance and la mort) and were shown in 1899 under the title "La Guerre, les figures hurlantes". Originally intended to form part of the Montauban monument to the dead of the 1870 war they were not in fact used for this work but used at Capoulet-et-Junac independently when the mayor Paul Voivenel asked Bourdelle's widow to allow the work to be reproduced and cast in bronze for the Capoulet-et-Junac war memorial. The sculpture certainly recreates the horror which must have been experienced by those fighting in the trenches
Trôo War memorial (monument aux morts)	Trôo		Bourdelle worked on this rather sombre war memorial which has little sculptural content.

Apart from the war memorials mentioned above Bourdelle also worked on a "Monument aux Députés morts pour La France", a memorial honouring the Deputies who had died in the 1914–18 war. He was keen on placing the memorial in the central niche of the Salle du Roi in the Palais Bourbon, a room dominated by Delacroix' paintings and designed the memorial so as not to clash with these works. The female figure in the statue, said to be based on Isadora Duncan, held a huge short sword and held aloft a round shell of the type carried by Greek hoplites. The piece was called "La Victoir du Droit". Bourdelle completed the maquette, the intention being that the final marble statue would be 3.25m high. The project was not pursued by the French State.

Bourdelle's 1922/23 La Vierge à l'Offrande or Vierge à l'Enfant in grey chauvigny limestone at Niederbruck, although not an actual war memorial, was directly linked to the 1914–18 war. Léon Vogt, a pupil of Bourdelle, owned potash mines in Alsace and in 1914 his mother vowed that if the family property was kept from destruction during the war she would commission a statue to celebrate this. She died during the war but after the war, Léon commissioned Bourdelle to execute a suitable statue. Bourdelle completed various studies and the second study, enlarged to 2.5m, was placed in the crypt at Hartmannswillerkopf. The same study but now 6m high was placed on the slope of the wooded hill above Niederbruck in the Manavaux valley to fulfil Mme Voigt's vow. The work was exhibited in the "Section d'Art Religieux" at the Salon d'Automne" of 1921–22. In Bourdelle's work the baby Jesus is held above her shoulder by the Virgin Mary, His arms are outstretched so his body takes on the form of a Cross. The inscription on the statue also gives thanks for Alsace-Lorraine's return to France after the war.

"En reconnaissance de la protection divine sur la vallée de Masevaux et du retour de l’Alsace-Lorraine à la France les époux Joseph Vogt 1914–1918"

== Images of Bourdelle's war memorials ==
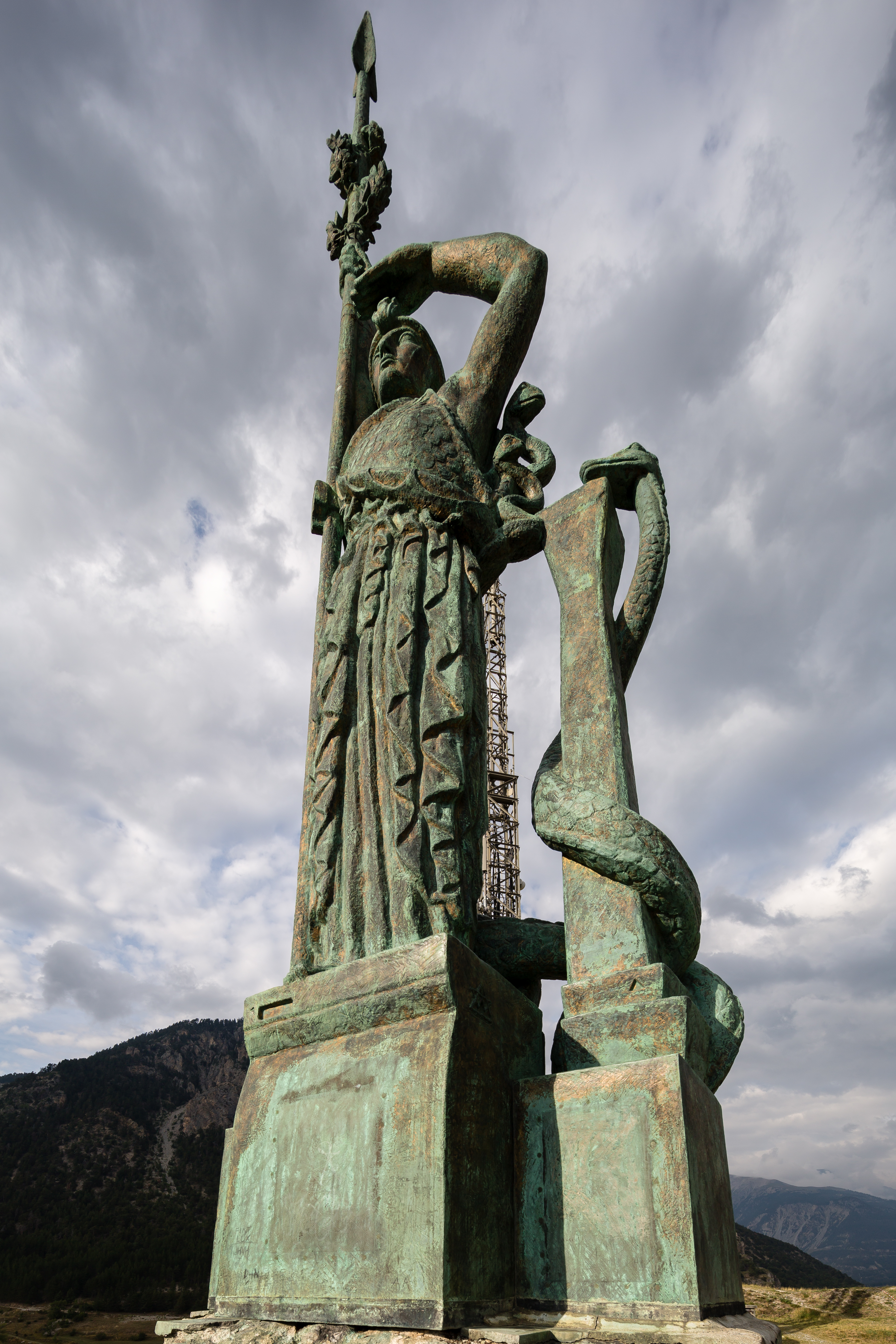
"La France" at Briançon.

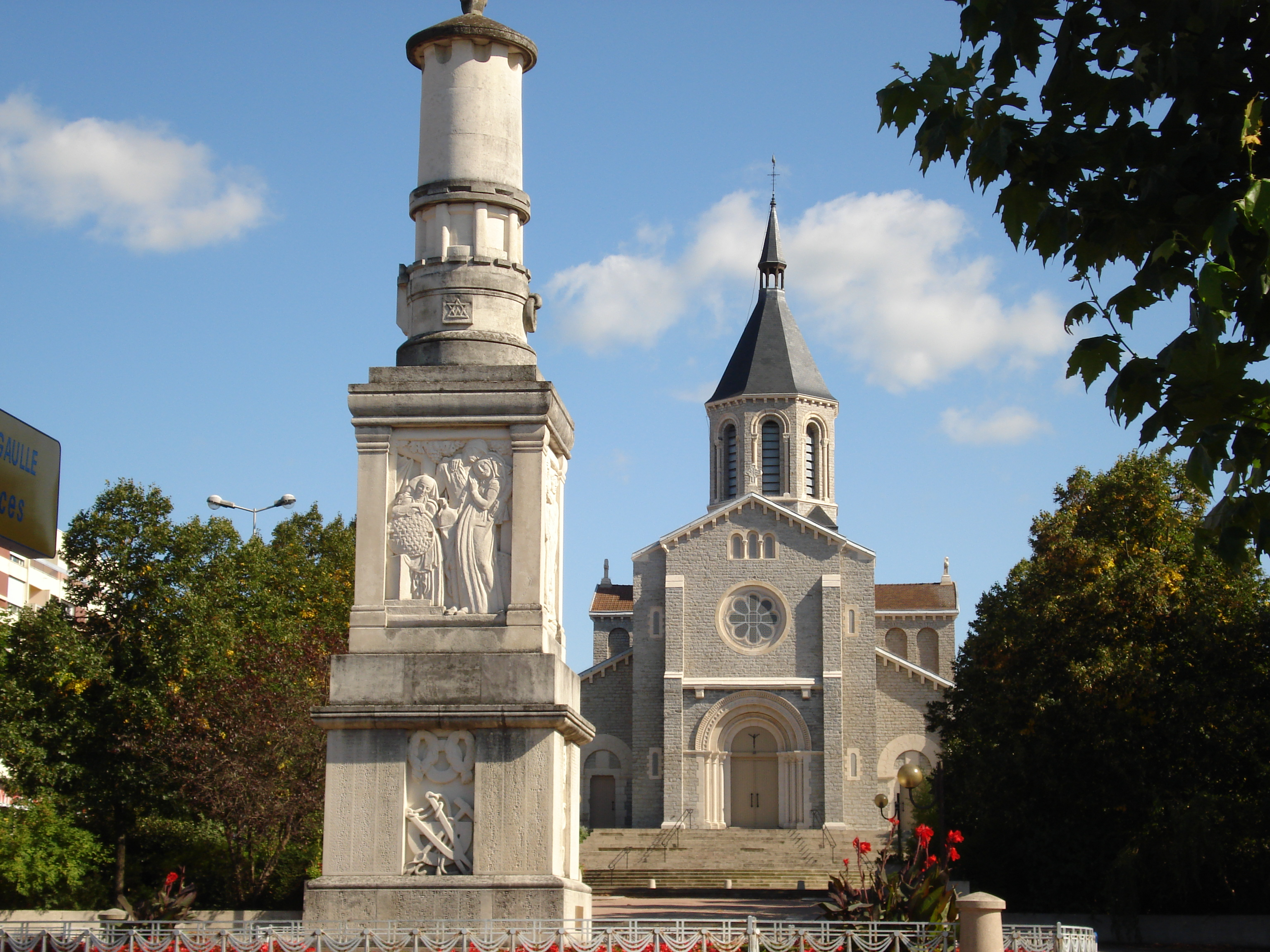
View of Montceau-les-Mines War Memorial in front of the parish church. We can see the bas-relief showing a soldier saying his farewells before going off to war and the reproduction of a miner's lamp.

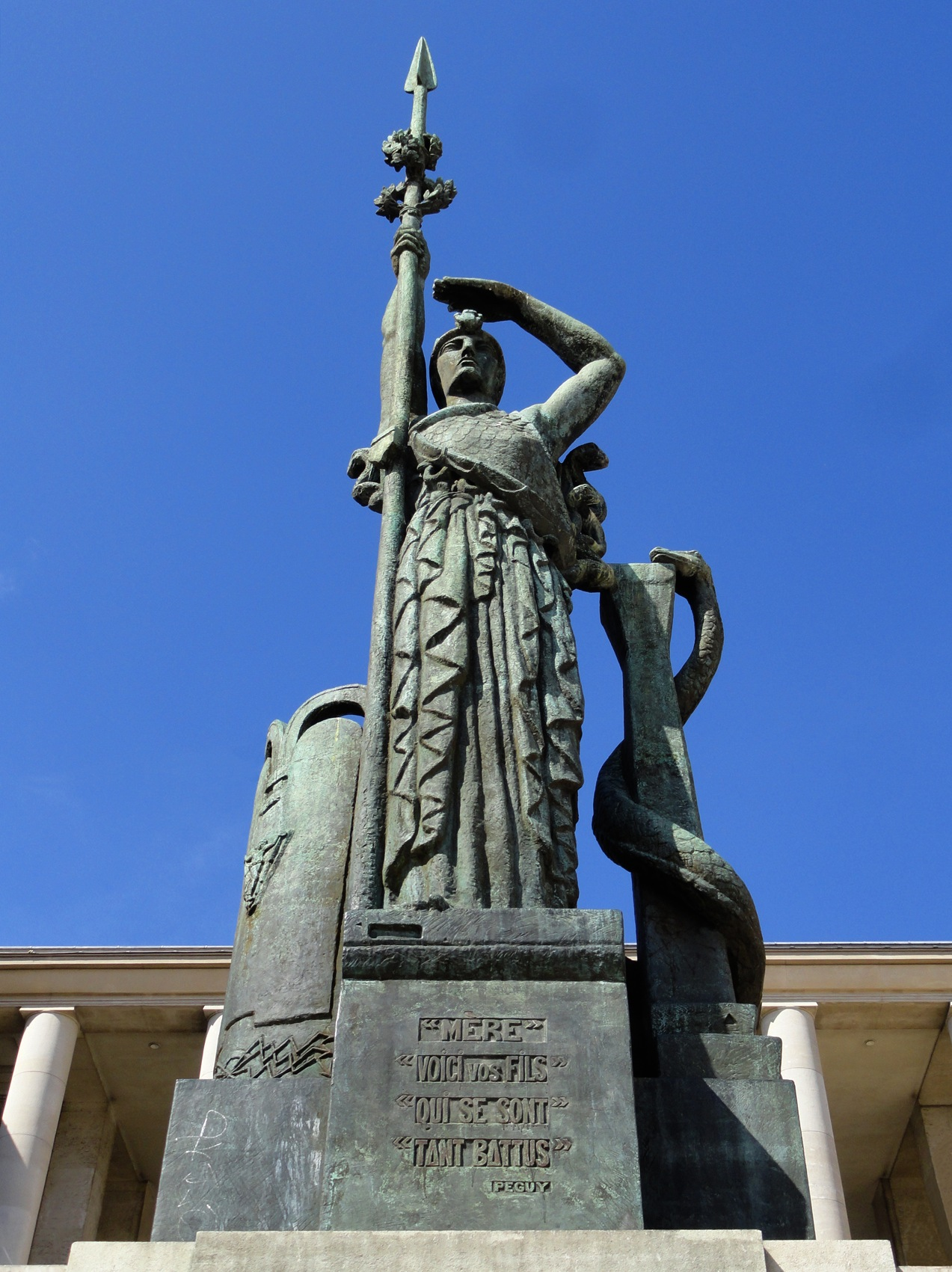
Monument honouring the "Free French". Bourdelle here used his work La France.

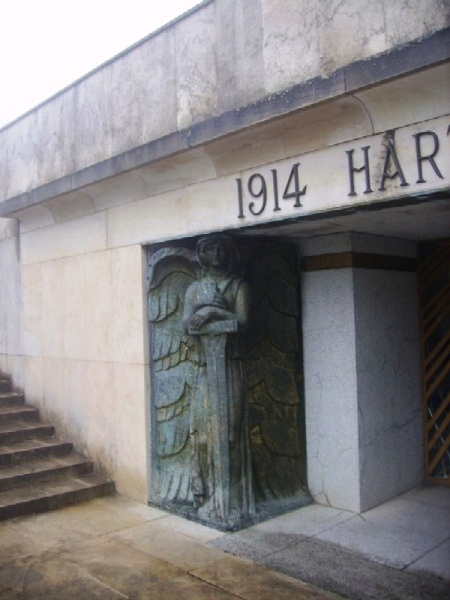
One of the two Bourdelle's statues by the entrance of the National Monument of the Hartmannswillerkopf.

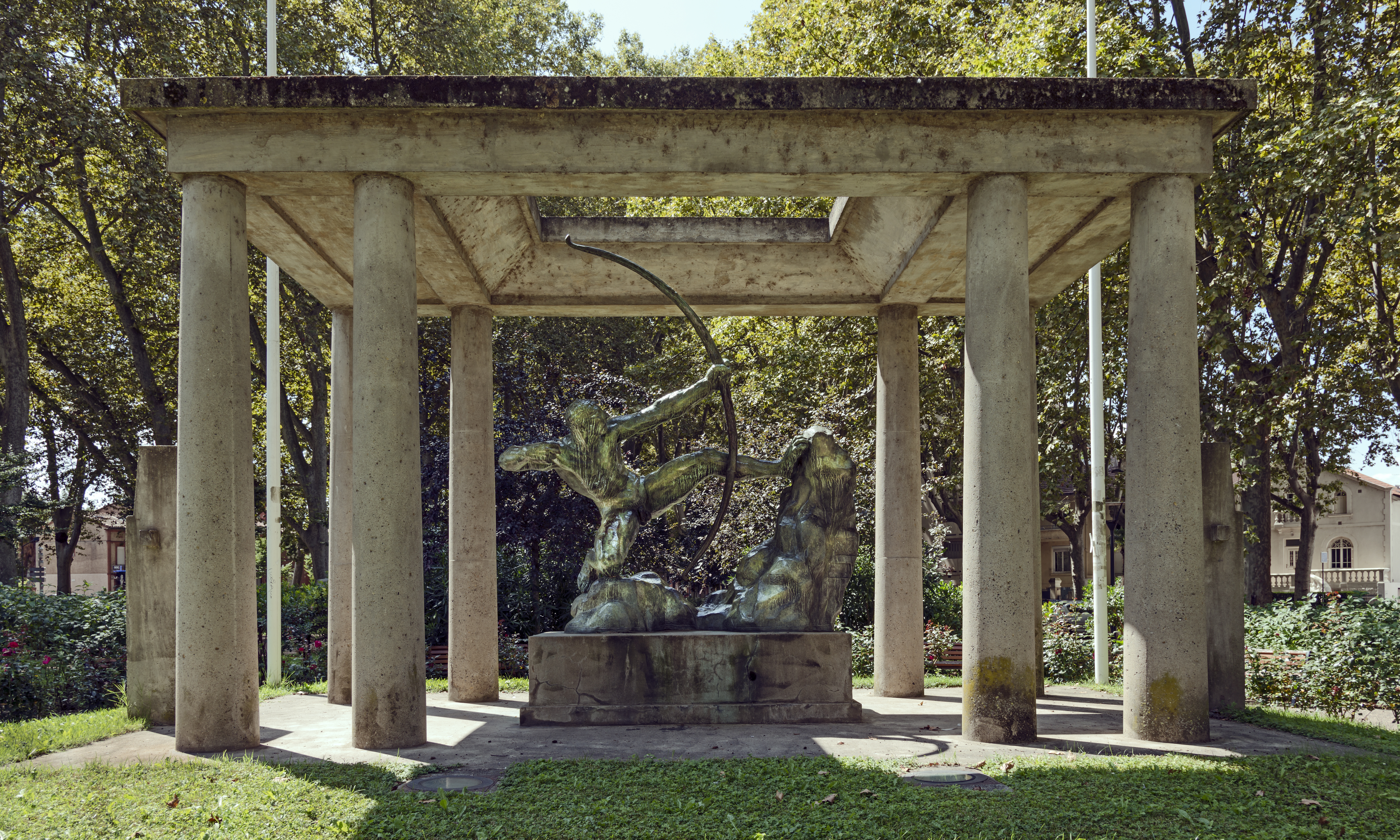
Héraklès archer de Toulouse. Monument in memory of the dead athletes to the 1914–18 war

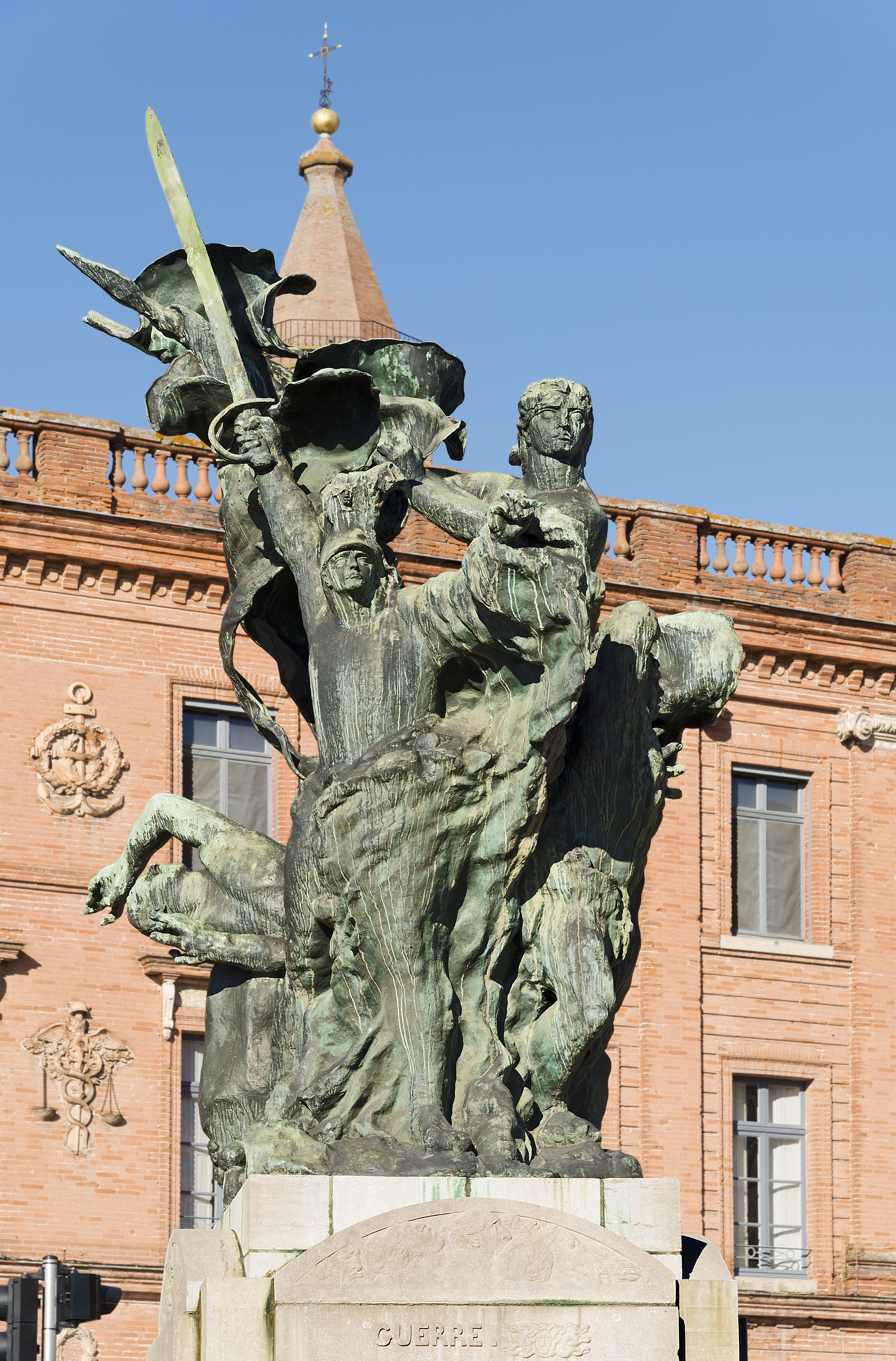
The Montauban memorial to the dead of the 1870 Franco-Prussian war.

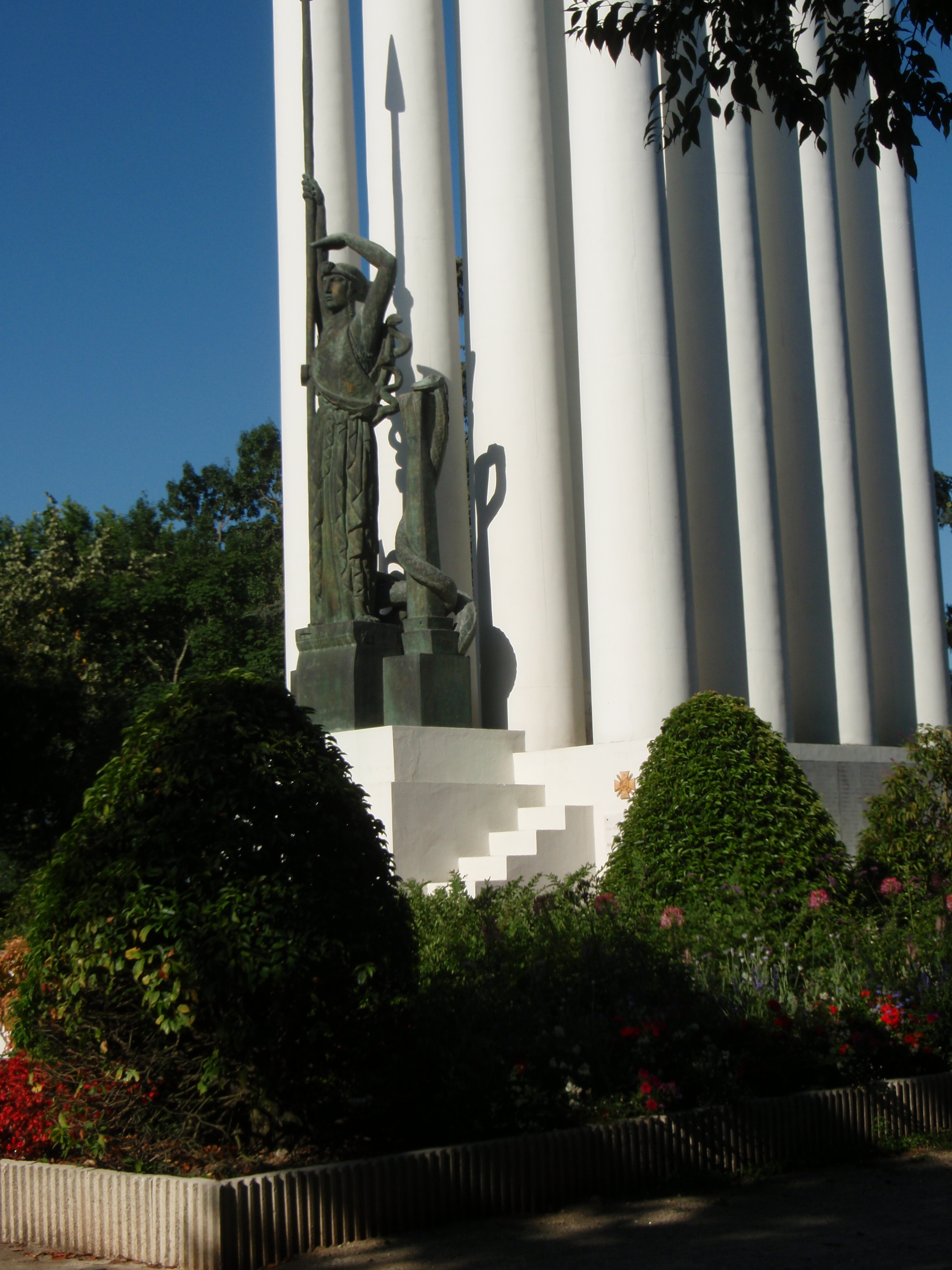
Montauban's Great War memorial consisting of an allegory of a victorious France standing before a white 12 pillared temple. Again Bourdelle used his La France composition.

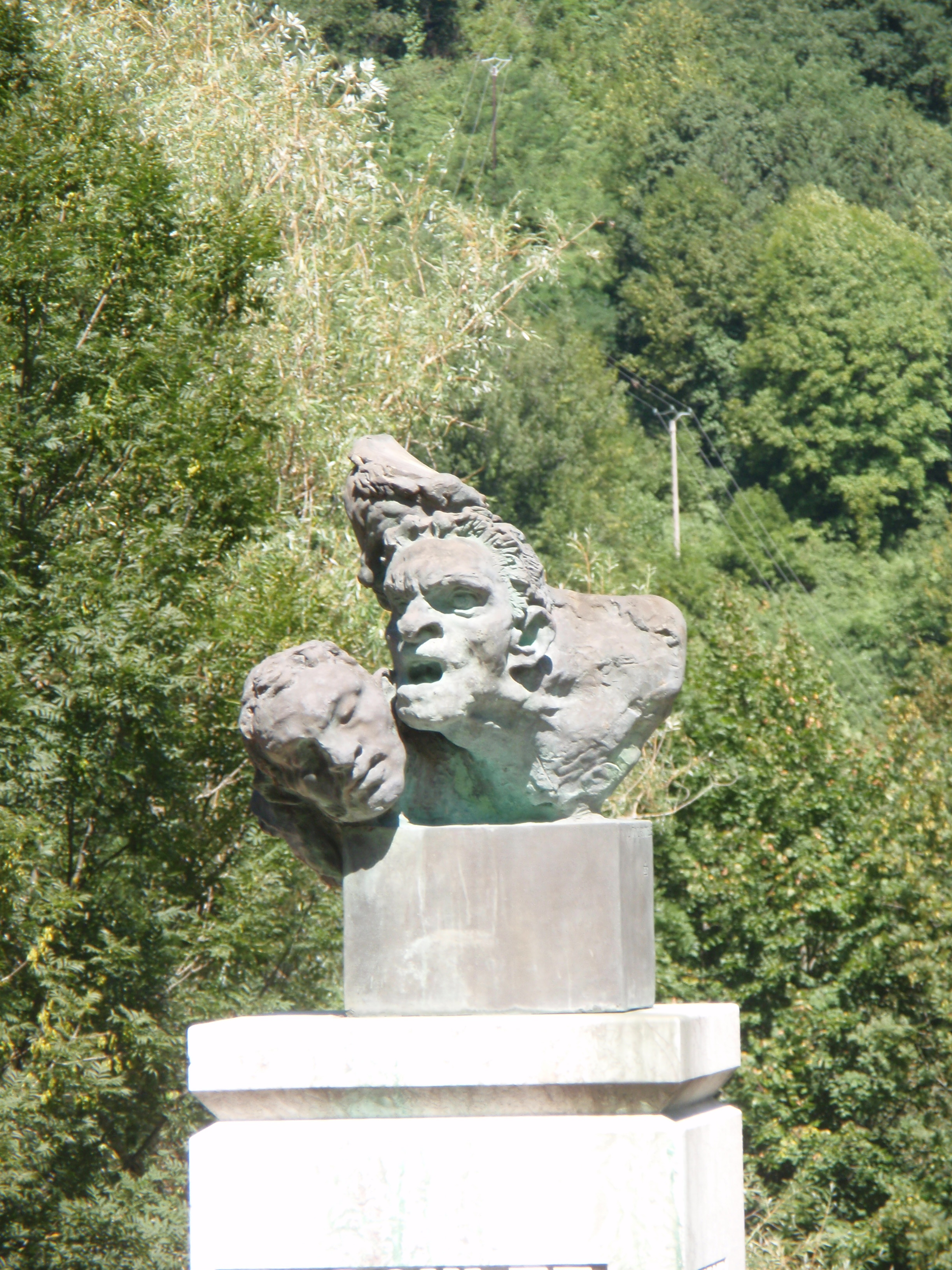
Capoulet-et-Junac War Memorial. An evocation of the horrors of war.

== Busts by Bourdelle ==
Louis Gillet wrote

"..no one has made more beautiful busts than those of Koeberle, Anatole France, M. Simu, Auguste Perret and Sir James Fraser"

Here are details of some of these busts, including the acclaimed studies of Beethoven which occupied Bourdelle over a long period of time. Bourdelle often submitted portrait busts to the Salons in the hope of attracting commissions. The bust "Adam" was submitted to the Salon des Artists Français in 1888 and he had submitted his bust of Armand Saintis in 1884, Delard in 1885, the actor "Marais" in 1886 and "La Marquise Silvia de Mari" and "St Merlatti" in 1887.

Name	Location	Date	Notes
Bust of Emile Garrisson	Montauban. Musée Ingres-Bourdelle	1885	A Bronze bust of this Montauban personality. Bust of Emile Garrisson
Coquelin Ainé (Benoît-Constant Coquelin)	Musée Bourdelle, Paris		A bronze bust of the elder Coquelin brother.
Bust of Coquelin Cadet (Ernest Alexandre Honoré Coquelin)	Musée Ingre-Bourdelle, Montauban	1891	A bust in Terra cotta of the younger Coquelin entitled "Coquelin Cadet en Mascarille". Mascarille was one of Moliére's great characters. "Coquelin Cadet en Mascarille"
Bust of Achille Bouïs	Montauban. Musée Ingres	1882	A bust in terracotta of the Montauban photographer.
Bust of Célestin Argaud	Toulouse. Musée des Augustins	1885	A work in terracotta.
Busts of Félicien Champsaur and his wife Madame Champsaur	Whereabouts not known.	1891	Champsaur was an influential art critic who became a close friend. He wrote a highly complimentary article on Bourdelle for the " Courier de Montauban". These two busts were shown at the Société National des Beaux-Arts Salon of 1891.
Bust of François Moulenq	Montauban; Musée Ingres	1894	A work commissioned by the Société Archéologique de Tarn-et-Garonne. Bourdelle executed two versions. One is held by the Montauban Musée Ingres and a smaller version with a terracotta coloured patina is held in Valence d'Agen's mairie. "Bust of François Moulenq"
"Beethoven aux grands cheveux"	Montauban; Musée Ingres	1891	When a young man Bourdelle was said to have looked very much like Beethoven which might explain his obsession with creating portraits of him."Beethoven with long hair", is one of Bourdelle's best known depictions of Beethoven. A work in plaster depicting a windswept Beethoven which is inscribed "Mon doémaine c'est l'air / quand le vent se lève / mon âme tourbillonne" In 1888 Bourdelle had produced his "Beethoven, la joue appuyée sur une main"- Beethoven with cheek resting on one hand". "Beethoven aux grands cheveux"
Bronze bust of Léon Cladel	Montauban. Musée Ingres	1894	Cladel the French writer was a good friend of Bourdelle and after his death in 1892 a committee was formed to organize a sculpture, Bourdelle received the commission, and the resultant bust was erected in one of Montauban's public squares in 1894. In 1937 it was transferred to the Ingres museum who also hold the plaster version. Bronze bust of Léon Cladel
Bust of Dr. Fege	Mont-de-Marsan. Musée de la ville	1900	The original plaster version is held by the Musée Bourdelle.
Beethoven ("à la colonne")	Montauban. Musée Ingres	1902	The years 1901 to 1910 were to see further studies of Beethoven. Apart from "à la colonne", 1901 saw him execute "Beethoven, Grand Masque Tragique", 1902 "Beethoven, dit Metropolitan", 1903 the "Large Beethoven, resting on his Arm" and "Beethoven assis au rocher", 1904 to 1908 saw "Beethoven dans le vent" and 1908 saw the bronze "Beethoven with Two Hands", and 1910 "Beethoven drapé". The composition "à la colonne" was a variation on the small depiction of Beethoven known as the "dit Metropolitan" a plaster work presented to the Paris salon in 1902 and inscribed with Beethoven's words "Moi je suis Bacchus / qui pressure pour les hommes / son nectar délicieux" Beethoven ( "à la colonne")
Jean-Auguste-Dominique Ingres	Musée Ingres-Bourdelle	1907	Bust of the great French painter. Bust of Ingres by Bourdelle
Bust of Rodin	Montauban; Musée Ingres-Bourdelle	1909	A work in terracotta. Shown at the Paris salon of 1910. Bust of Auguste Rodin
Auguste Quercy	Montauban. Musée Ingres-Bourdelle	1911	The Bourdelle bust of the poet is positioned on a pedestal. Quercy was a good friend of Bourdelle and played an active role in promoting Bourdelle's work in Montauban. He chaired the committee which organised the award to Bourdelle for Léon Cladel's bust and was a force behind securing Bourdelle the commission for the Montauban 1870 War Memorial. Auguste Quercy
Bust of Tristan Corbière	Musée Bourdelle	1912	A bronze of the French poet.
Eugène Koeberlé	Musée d'Orsay	1914	A bronze bust of Dr. Koeberlé, an Alsatian surgeon who is credited for developing a precursor of present-day surgical hemostats
Onésime Reclus	Musée Despiau-Wlérick. Mont-de-Marsan	1915	A plaster bust.
Anatole France	Musée d'Orsay	1919	A bronze bust cast by Alexis and Eugène Rudier. Anatole France by Bourdelle
Sir James Frazer	Musée Ingres, Montauban	1922	There are many copies of this work around. Sir James George Frazer was an eminent anthropologist, whose widely-read 1890 book "The Golden Bough" traced recurrent patterns in the myths and religious practices of early cultures around the world. Of this bust Frazer wrote "I don't know if in fact my face has all that gravity, all that philosophical profundity; but... I should be glad if after my death this portrait alone was kept and all the others destroyed". Sir James Frazer by Bourdelle
Auguste Perret	Musée d'Orsay	1922	A bronze bust of the French architect who was a pioneer in the use of reinforced concrete. The bust was first shown at the Salon des Tuileries in 1923. Cast by Alexis Rudier.

== Cathedrals and churches ==
Name	Location	Date	Notes
"Jeanne d'Arc au Sacre"	La collégiale Notre-Dame de l'Assomption.Vitry-le-François	1909	Bourdelle's statue of Joan of Arc is located in La chapelle Sainte Jeanne d'Arc. Bourdelle produced a maquette for this work in 1909 and exhibited the definitive version at that year's Salon d'Automne. It is a stone sculpture with a height of 2.31 metre and shows Joan of Arc carrying her standard or banner at the coronation of Charles VII in the Cathedral of Reims.
"Jeanne d'Arc à l'étendard" or "Jeanne d'Arc au Sacre"	Cathédrale Saint-André. Bordeaux	1909	The stone statue executed for Vitry-le-François proved such a success that casts in bronze were commissioned for Bordeaux and another church. The Bordeaux bronze was cast by Eugène Rudier in 1910. The plaster model is held by the Bordeaux Musée des Beaux-Arts.
"Jeanne d'Arc à l'étendard"	Église Saint-Église Saint-Martin Barentin	1909	A copy of the 1909 work mentioned above but in reinforced concrete.
Église Notre-Dame du Raincy	Le Raincy	1922	For this church, designed by Auguste Perret and his brother Gustave, Boudelle executed a Pietà for the tympanum over the church's entrance. The church, built in reinforced concrete, the Perret "trade mark", is regarded as the first "modern" French church. Bourdelle's Pietà-Église Notre-Dame du Raincy

In 1916 Bourdelle also created a small votive depicting St Barbe which is held by the Lyon Musée des Beaux-Arts. Bourdelle was asked to create the votive by the family of his brother-in-law, Dr Couchoud, as protection for their son who was away fighting in the artillery. Originally it was placed in the church of St Julien de l'Herm near Lyon before being transferred to the museum. The piece is in polychromed cement. There are copies of the work located in Stockholm, Rome, Bruxelles and Luxembourg.

== Works in Musée d'Orsay ==
Name	Location	Date	Notes
Ludwig van Beethoven	Musée d'Orsay	1903	The 1903 version in bronze of Bourdelle's study of the German composer. Between 1887 and 1929 Bourdelle worked on various ideas for sculptures of Beethoven and many of these can be seen at the Musée Bourdelle. A plaster version of the d'Orsay bust was shown at the 1902 Salon of the Société Nationale des Beaux-Arts. At the front of the pedestal are the words " Moi je suis Bacchus / qui pressure / pour les hommes / le nectar délicieux / Beethoven"
"Le bélier rétif"	Musée d'Orsay	1909	This bronze study of a shepherd trying to control a ram was cast in bronze by Alexis Rudier and his brother. Bourdelle had a deep love of animals and the countryside engendered by the holidays spent with his grandfather in the Causses. He had once described himself as "Un bon écollier des cchores" In the period 1907 to 1910, and apart from "Le bélier rétif" he worked on "Petite Pastorale" in 1907, "Faune et Chèvres" from 1908 to 1909, "Bélier Couché" in 1908 and "La Truie" in 1909.
"Combattant"	Musée d'Orsay	1905	Bronze head of Hercules cast by Adrien-Aurélien Hébrard. In fact a reprise of part of Montauban's Franco-Prussian war monument.
"L'Offrande"	Musée d'Orsay	1905	This bronze statuette was cast by the foundry of Adrien-Aurélien Hébrard. It is said that the inspiration for the work came from Cléopâtre Sevastos a young Greek student of Bourdelle's who became his second wife.
"Baigneuse à sa toilette"	La Piscine. Roubaix	1906	This bronze statuette was also called "Vénus à sa toilette". Castings made with a brown and a green patina. This version cast by A.A. Hébrard. At present on loan by Musée d'Orsay to Roubaix where an old public swimming bath has been converted for use as an art gallery.
Gustave Eiffel	Musée d'Orsay	1928	This bust sits on a pedestal at the foot of the Eiffel tower. Bust of Gustave Eiffel
"Force de la Volonté"	Musée d'Orsay, Paris	1914 to 1922	A bronze version of this work, cast by Alexis Rudier from Bourdelle's 1920 plaster model, stands on the terrace outside the Musée d'Orsay in the rue de Lille. "La Force" is part of the monument to Carlos María de Alvear in Buenos-Aires which Bourdelle was commissioned to execute in 1913. He completed the final model in 1922, this comprising the General astride a horse and four allegorical figures-"La Victoire", "La Force", "La Liberté" and "l'Eloquence" The maquette and working models of the sculpture can be seen in the Musée Bourdelle. The 1920 plaster model of "Force de la Volonté" was shown at the Salon de la Société Nationale des Beaux-Arts in 1920. There is another plaster model held by Grenoble's Musée des Beaux-Arts. Bourdelle had secured the commission through an Argentinian friend in Paris, Rodolfo Alcorta, and travelled to Argentina in 1912 to make some provisional studies and work on the preparation of a maquette. This maquette secured the commission but on the outbreak of the war in 1914, Bourdelle and family returned to Montauban. There he was to work on the commission throughout the war years, assisted by Mlle Markovitch, gradually increasing the size until he was able to exhibit the full-size figures at the Salon of the Société National des Beaux-Arts of 1920. Casting was completed in 1923 in time for the bronze to be exhibited in the Salon des Tuileries. The final unveiling took place in 1926. In 1914, Bourdelle also made studies for a Bolivar Monument but the commission was never received. Force de la Volonté outside the Musée d'Orsay
"La Victoire"	Musée d'Orsay, Paris	1919 to 1920	See entry above for "Force de la Volonté". "La Victoire" was another of the allegories Bourdelle created for the Alvéar monument. Also cast in bronze by Alexis Rudier from the 1920 plaster model, this sculpture stands outside the Musée d'Orsay alongside "La Force" This work was also shown at the 1920 Salon de la Société Nationale des Beaux-Arts. Monument to de Alvear

== Main works ==
Name	Location	Date	Notes
Bust of Pierre Laprade	Musée Bourdelle	1881	A bronze of the Montauban painter.
La Première victoire d'Hannibal	Musée Ingres	1885	1885 saw Bourdelle move into the studio on the Impasse du Maine - which is now the Bourdelle museum., and his plaster model The First Victory of Hannibal won "an honourable mention" at the Salon of French Artists. It was purchased by the Marquise de Mari who presented it to the Musée Ingres.
The Great Warrior of Montauban	Bamberg Fondation Toulouse	1898	This bronze was part of the Montauban Franco-Prussian war memorial and was cast in bronze in 1956 as a separate work. One copy can be seen in the Hirshhorn museum. The Great Warrior of Montauban
Garçon de Montauban	Musée Bourdelle	1885	An early Bourdelle work in bronze.
Maternité	National Gallery of Australia Canberra	1893	It was whilst working in Rodin's studio as a "praticien" (a studio assistant who helped complete works in marble) that he completed this plaster composition of a mother and child which was cast in bronze as a limited edition in 1914 by the Hébrard foundry.
Lycée Ingres	Montauban		In the college foyer are medallions depicting François Arago and Jules Michelet.
Le fruit or Pomone	Petit Palais. Paris	1902 to 1911	Bourdelle worked on this sculpture depicting Pomona between from 1902 to 1911. The bronze version was cast by the Coubertin foundry and there are bronze casts both in the Petit Palais and the Musée Bourdelle. The Petit Palais was built for the 1900 Universal Exhibition and now houses the City of Paris Museum of Fine Arts (Musée des Beaux-Arts de la ville de Paris).
Pénélope	Various locations, including Canberra	1905–12	In the early 1900s, Bourdelle found great inspiration from mythology and the story of Penelope, the ever faithful wife of Odysseus, who waited ten years for her husband to return from the Trojan war, is an example of this and a full size version of the bronze Pénélope was shown for the first time in 1912. Spurning the ever-increasing trend amongst sculptors for direct carving or working from fully sizes models, Bourdelle was very much a traditionalist and for the most part began projects with a maquette then refining and enlarging the sculpture through successive stages. This often meant a long gestation period from an original idea and design drawing through to a final sculpture. The sculpture of Penelope is a good example of this and it was developed in four stages, through two small studies in 1905 and 1907, and a half-size version of 1909 (1.20 metre in height) before the monumental sculpture was completed in 1912, in time to be exhibited at the Salon de la Société Nationale des Beaux Arts. Examples of the full size version, 2.40 metres in height, can be seen in Holland's Krollermuller d’Otterlo Museum, in the Honolulu museum and in Canberra's National Gallery whilst the smaller sized version with a height of 1.20 metres can be seen in Paris' Petit Palais, in Amsterdam, in Lille and Tokyo's Bridgestone Museum. In the 1905 version, Penelope carries a spindle reminding us of her method of forestalling her many suitors during Odysseus' long absence; she told them that she could not choose between them until she had finished work on a tapestry, but what she wove by day she unravelled by night. The spindle was omitted for the 1907 version as was the case with all subsequent versions. In the 1907 version the height was increased by 61 cm. The final monumental version was completed in 1912. Pénélope 1912
Jean-Baptiste Carpeaux	Hôtel de Ville. Paris	1909	Bourdelle depicts Carpeaux, the great French sculptor of the Second Empire, at work. Copies of this bronze can be seen outside Paris' Hôtel de Ville and in Lyon's Musée des Beaux-Arts. 2.46m in height the bronze was shown at the 1909 Salon of the Société Nationale des Beaux-Arts. Statue of Carpeaux
Rodin travaillant à sa Porte de L'enfer	Musée Rodin	1910	Bourdelle depicts Rodin working on his Porte de l'Enfer. Cast in bronze in 1927 by Rudier and given as a gift to the museum. Rodin at work on the sculpture Porte de l'Enfer-The Gates of Hell
Plaque for war orphans from the 1914–18 war	Besançon Musée du Temps	1915	Bourdelle executed this rectangular pressed metal plaque as part of the campaign to raise funds for the orphans of employees of the French Post and Telecommunications centered on the "Foyer de Cachan". It was inscribed "Oeuvre des orphelins des P.T.T." The plaque depicted a postman delivering mail against a backdrop of ruins including a burning church. He is handing a letter down to a woman who appears to be in a shelter whilst he consoles a young girl who clings to him. Presumably the letter contains an announcement of the death of a husband/ father.
Héraklès tue les oiseaux du lac Stymphale ("Heracles the Archer")	Le Vésinet	1929	The first casting in bronze of this composition dates to 1909, after several preliminary studies (circa 60 cm high) and it was exhibited at the 1910 Salon of the Société Nationale des Beaux-Arts. The height was 2.50 metres. It was purchased for his garden at Meudon by Gabriel Thomas of the Société du Théatre des Champs-Elysées and this is thought to have led Thomas to ultimately work on the famous decorations of the theatre. Thomas certainly encouraged Bourdelle to produce studies for that project. Thomas tried to ensure that no further copies were made so that his would be unique but Bourdelle refused and the work was returned to him only to be purchased immediately by Prince Eugène of Sweden. It still remains at Waldemarsudde near Stockholm. Thomas then changed his mind but had to make do with one of the second castings (2.48 metres). The first and second castings are limited to ten casts of each and there is a third plaster version of 2.52 metres. The model for the figure of Hercules was Doyen Parigot, a fitness fanatic serving as Commandant de Cuirassiers. He was killed in 1916 at Verdun. The copy at Le Vésinet is a bronze casting by Alexis and Eugène Rudier dating to 1923 and commissioned for the Luxembourg museum. Bourdelle added two reliefs to the work- L'hydre de Lerne and Le Lion de Némée. The Musée Bourdelle hold a 1923 plaster model but there are copies in many of the leading international museums. The photograph below shows the copy in Lyon's Musée des Beaux-Arts. The sculpture features in the Toulouse War Memorial. See entry under "War memorials". Copy of Héraklès tue les oiseaux du lac Stymphale in Lyon
Monument to Adam Mickiewicz	Place de l’Alma Paris	1909	This monument, using Bourdelle's sculptures, was erected in 1929 shortly before his death. The monument had a long drawn-out genesis, not helped by Bourdelle's declining health and was first discussed in 1908. It is a celebration of the great Polish writer and poet, the patriot Adam Mickiewicz. Mickiewicz spent time as an exile in Paris and taught at the Collège de France becoming a good friend of Jules Michelet and Edgar Quinet. Bourdelle had long been interested in working on a monument to Mickiewicz and needed no persuasion to accept the commission when approached in 1908. He knew much of the great champion of Polish national freedom and when visiting Poland in 1908 as a member of the jury judging the competition for the Chopin monument, he saw at first hand the Pole's suffering since the 3rd Partition of 1795. The ever fastidious Bourdelle produced maquettes in 1909 and 1910 and in that year was able to show the "Head of Mickiewicz" at the Salon de la Société Nationale des Beaux-Arts. It was not until 1928 that the work was completed, with the casting by Rudier and the unveiling taking place in 1929. The figure of Mickiewicz stands on a column at the base of which are bas-reliefs inspired by Mickiewicz' work; Wallenrod, The Captives, Dziady, Aldona and Old Haslban. The bas-relief Trois Polognes is an allegory for Poland's tormented history partitioned by Russia, Austria and Prussia. Part of Bourdelle's composition is L’Épopée Polonaise shown in the photograph in the gallery below, a copy of which is held in the musée Bourdelle. The monument is a gift from Poland to France.

== Images of Mickievicz monument, including bas-reliefs ==
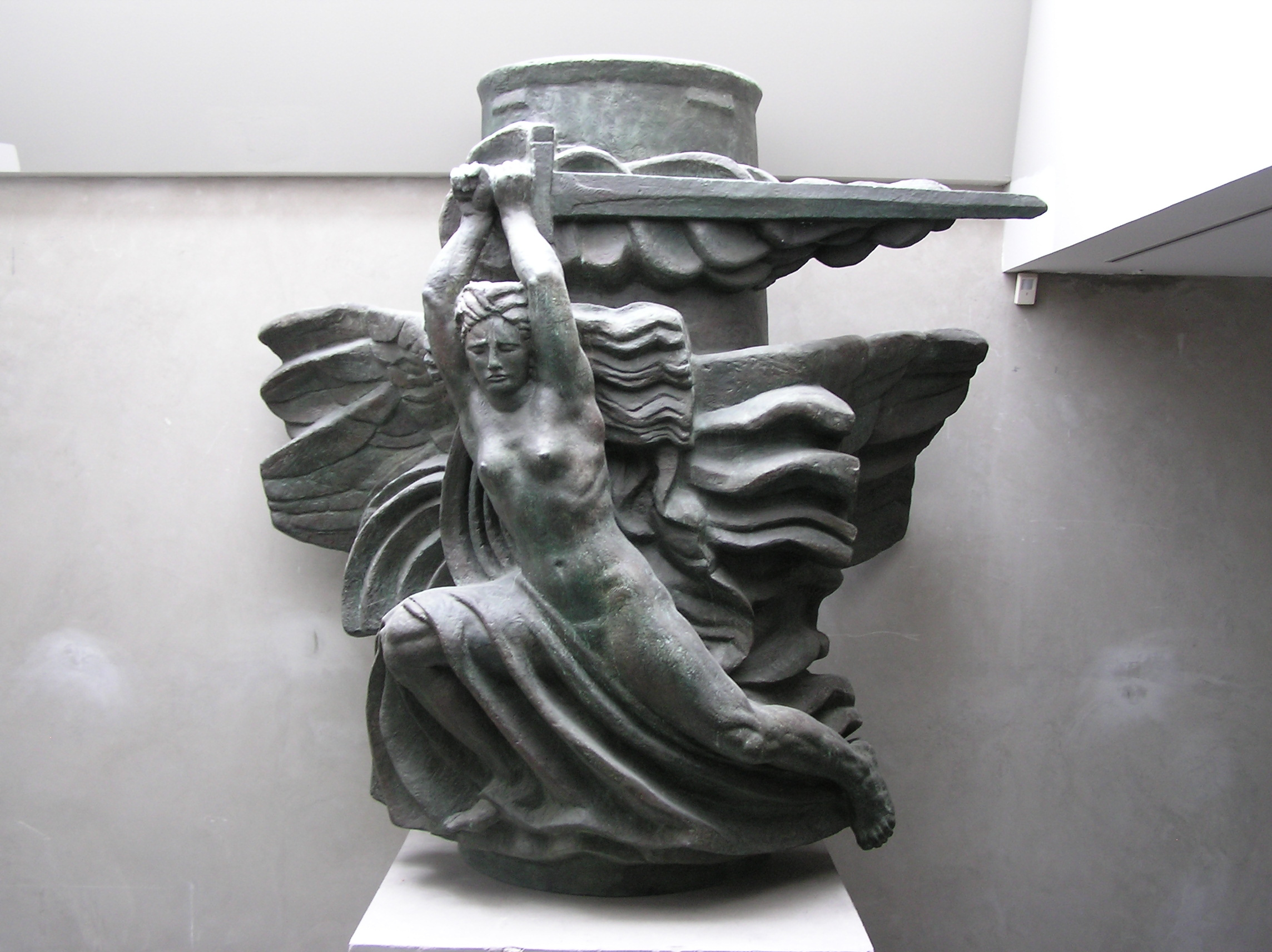
"L’Épopée Polonaise"-The Polish epic.

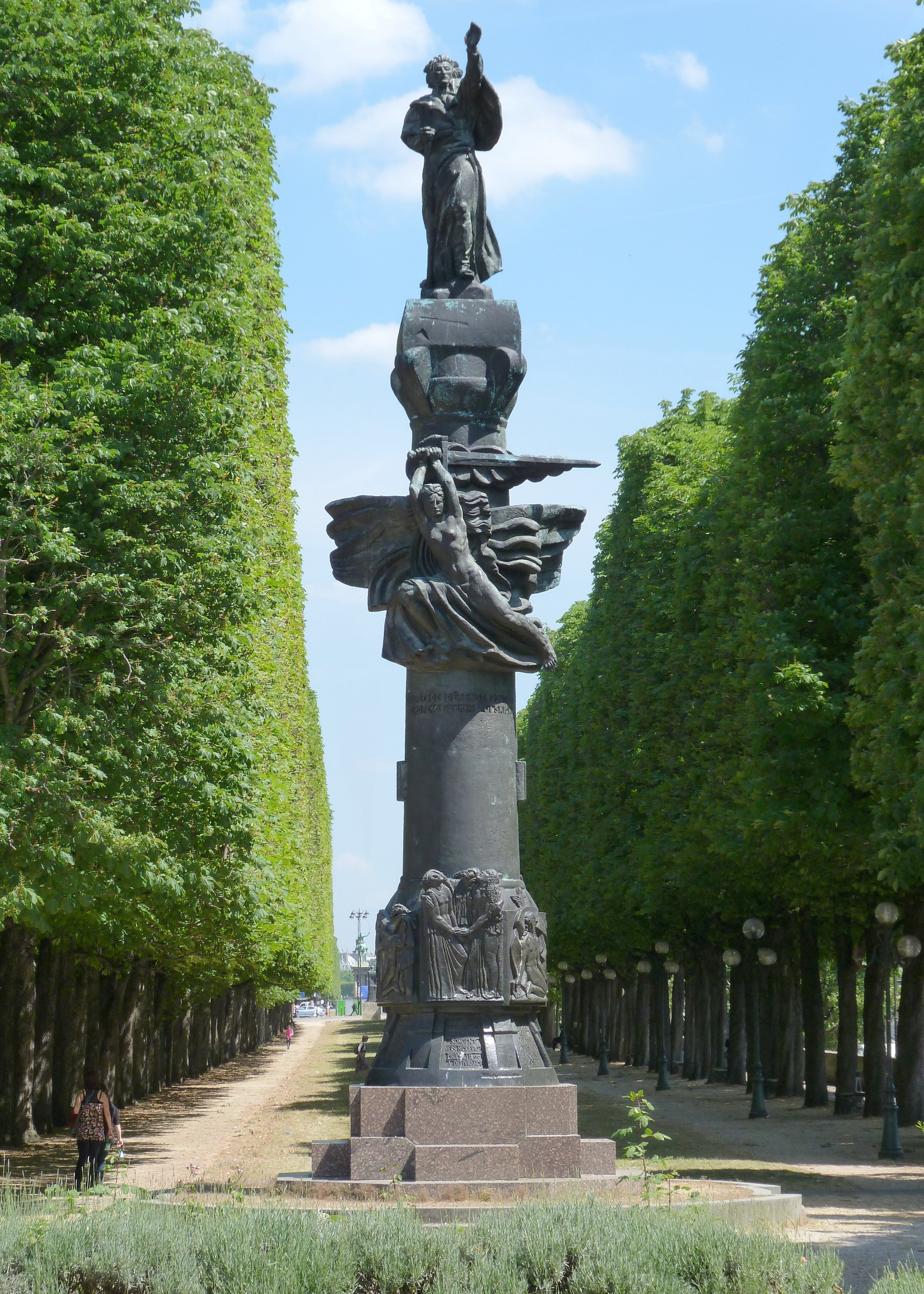
The Mickievicz monument

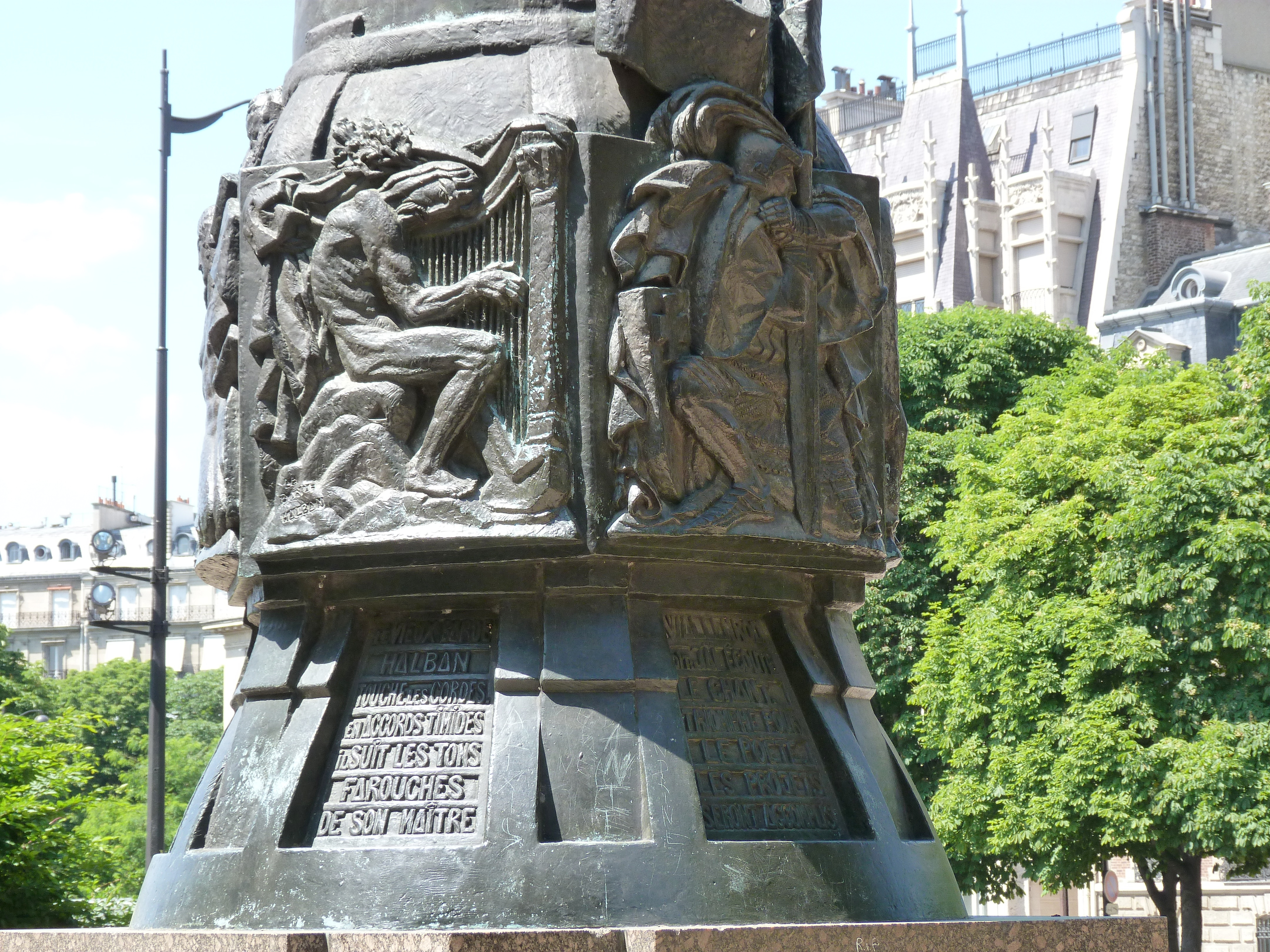
Two of the bas-reliefs on the Mickievicz monument. "Old Halban" to the left and "The Captives" to the right.

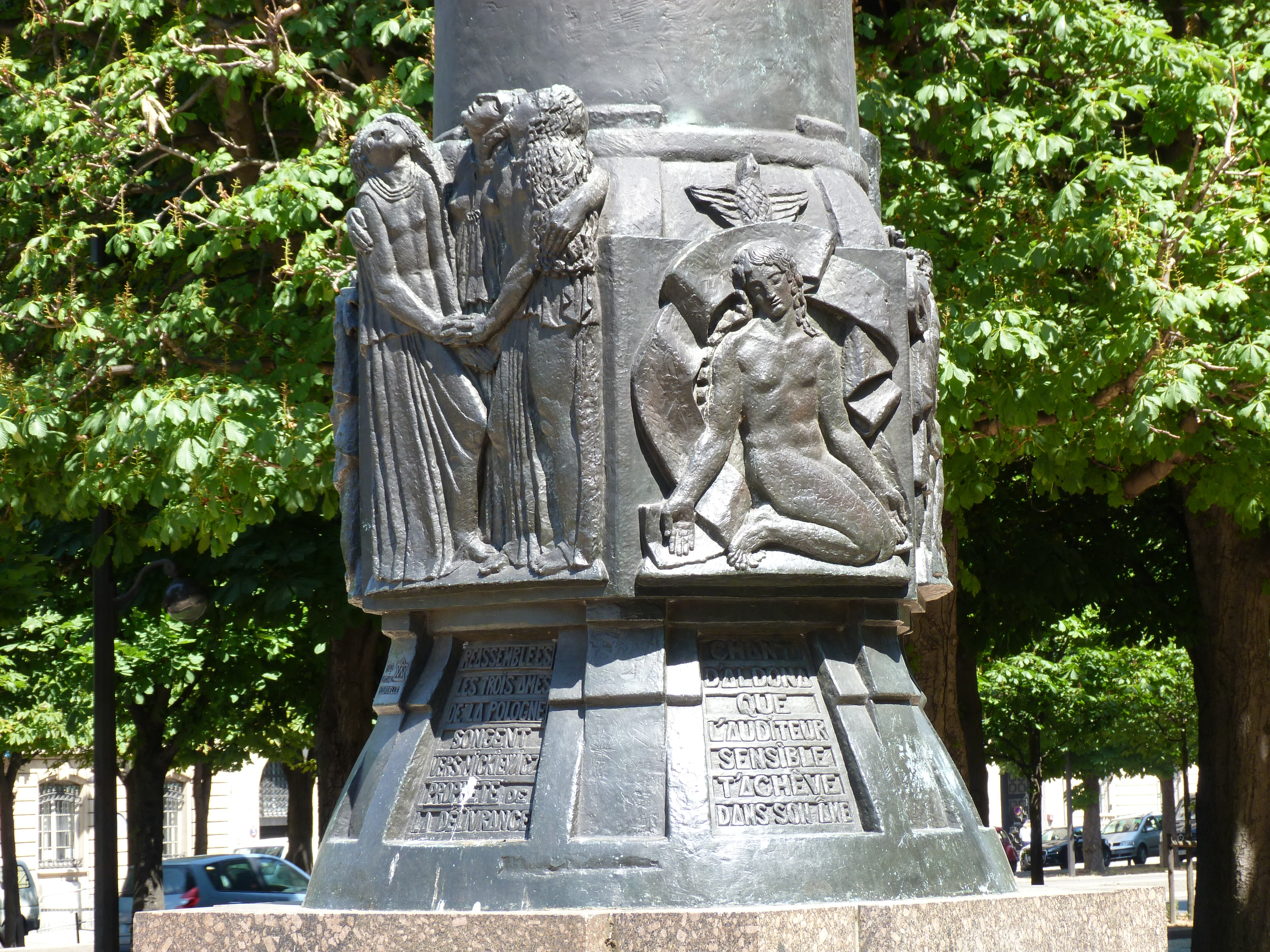
Two of the bas-reliefs on the Mickievicz monument."The Three Polands" and "Aldona"

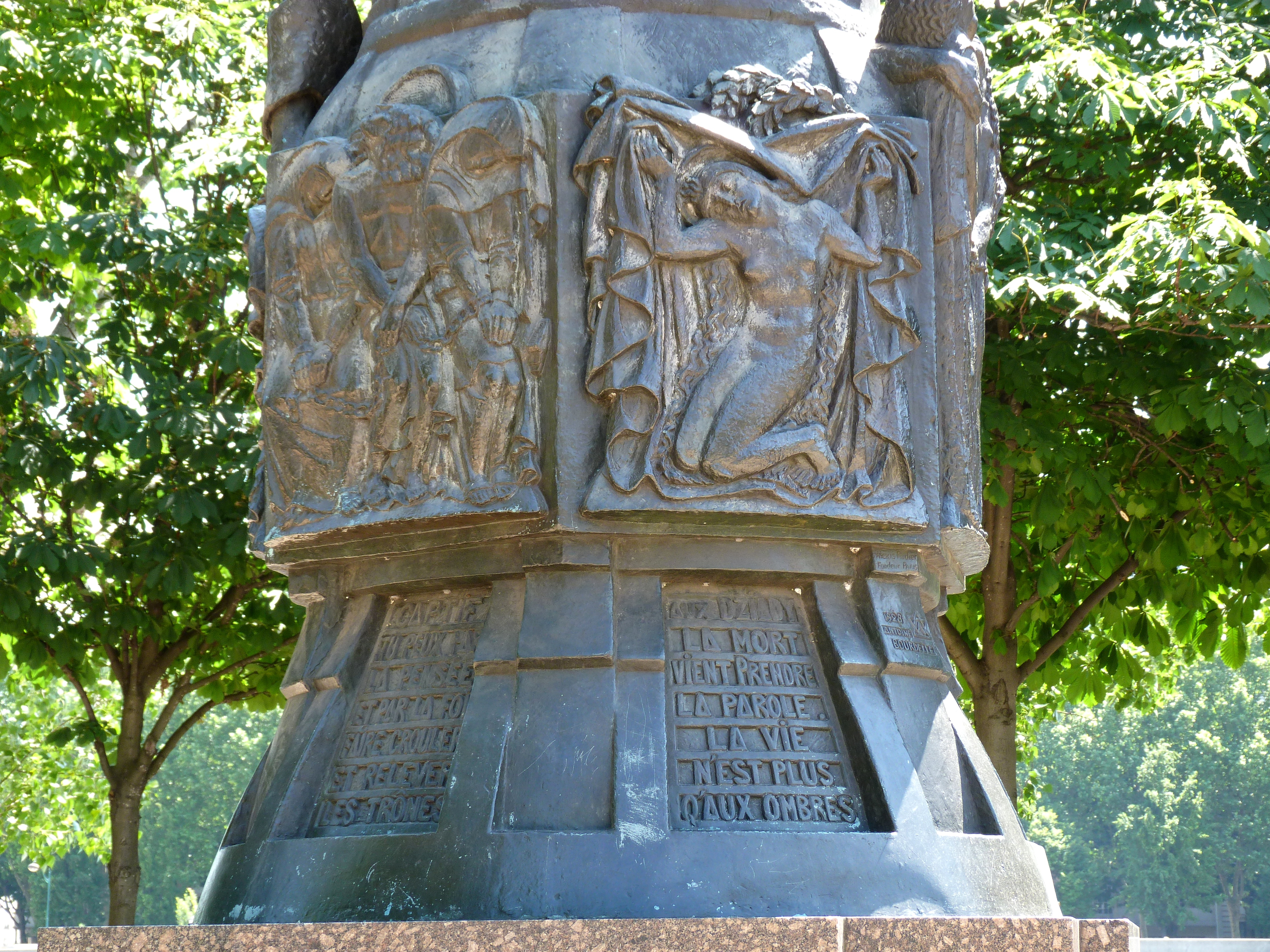
One of the bas-reliefs on the Mickievicz monument."Dziady"

== Main works (continued) ==
Name	Location	Date	Notes
"Tête d'Apollon"	Musée d'Orsay	1900–09	This work is thought by many to be a watershed marking a fundamental change in Bourdelle's work. Cannon-Brookes wrote "Bourdelle's development as a sculptor had taken a decisive turn in a new direction" and when Rodin saw the work he said "Ah Bourdelle, vous me quittez" The museum hold a bronze version cast by Alexis and Eugène Rudier with a gold leaf patina. Various editions of the work were cast and it can also be seen in the Musée Bourdelle and the museums of Lausanne, Montpellier and Stockholm. Interesting to note that Bourdelle started studies of the head of Apollo when still employed as an assistant (practicien) to Rodin.
Musée Grévin	Paris	1900	The year 1900 saw Gabriel Thomas commission Bourdelle to execute large bas-reliefs "Les Nuages" above the proscenium arch and "Les nuées" for the museum's entrance. Reliefs on Musée Grévin-"Les nuées"
"Le Jour et la Nuit"	Musée Bourdelle	1903	In Bourdelle's composition a man represents "Day" his eyes turned skywards. A hand is on his shoulder, the hand of an indistinct "Night".
Monument to Antoine Bourdelle with Self Portrait	Place Bourdelle, Montauban	1925	This bronze is located in Montauban's square du Général Picard.
Self Portrait with a Hat	Musée Bourdelle	1929	A bronze self-portrait.
"La mort du dernier centaure"	Montauban	1914	A bronze version of this work stands in Montauban's Rue de l'Hôtel de Ville / Rue Marie Lafon. The work dates back to 1911 and was ordered for Buenos Aires by its mayor Jorge Lavalle Cobo. Cobo had seen and liked a small sculpture of a centaur which he had seen at the sculptor's Paris studio in 1911 and had commissioned the larger version. Although ordered in 1912, the 1914–18 war delayed its casting in bronze, and it only reached Argentina in 1916. It can be seen near to the Place de la Recoleta. In 1925 another bronze casting was placed in Paris' Salon des Tuileries. La mort du dernier centaure
Opéra de Marseille	Marseille		Inaugurated in 1787 the Marseille Opera House was destroyed by a fire in November 1919. It was rebuilt between 1921 and 1924, various artists being involved, and the plans being designed by the architects Gaston Castel, Henri Ebrard and George Raymond. Bourdelle completed a pigmented stucco relief over the proscenium arch of the Opéra de Marseille. The figures are painted in brick red and evoke the birth of beauty-"La Naissance de la Beauté". Aphrodite is received by Eros and on either side are the Muses of Art. On the left of Aphrodite, Bourdelle depicts "La Comédie musicale", "La Danse", "l’Epopée", "Le Chant" and "La Mémoire Théâtrale" and on her right "La Tragédie","La Poésie lyrique", "La Méditation", and "La Mémoire". Above a young shepherd holds Pan's pipes to represent "Le Chant agreste".
"Virgin Mary"	The National Gallery of Scotland.		The composition used for Niederbruck had been used earlier for this sculpture. The figure of the Virgin Mary was said to have been based on Bourdelle's wife Cléopatre, and the child Jesus on his daughter Rhodia. His wife was also a sculptor and the head-scarf worn by the Virgin was inspired by one she used when carving, to keep the dust out of her hair.
Théâtre des Champs-Élysées	Paris	1910 to 1913	Gabriel Thomas was a financier and Chairman of the Societe de la Tour Eiffel and the Musée Grevin for which Bourdelle had produced reliefs in 1909. He had also been the first purchaser of "Heracles the Archer". He conceived the idea of building a large modern theatre and purchased land on the Avenue Montaigne in 1910. Auguste Perret was appointed the designing architect and Bourdelle was commissioned to execute a series of marble friezes for the theatre's façade, as well as for the atrium, one of many occasions when he was to work with Perret who pioneered the use of re-inforced concrete (béton armé). In a "tour de force" Bourdelle created over 70 individual compositions, many inspired by the dancing of Isadora Duncan. One of the bas-reliefs was entitled "La Tragédie" and the plaster mould for this can be seen in Montauban's Musée Ingres. It dates to 1912. The museum also have the plaster moulds for the reliefs "Musique", "La Danse", "La Comédie", "Apollon et sa méditation", "La Sculpture et l'Architecture" and "Une muse, dite Muse échevelée". Within the theatre itself the sculptural decoration is limited to the pair of narrow low-reliefs in marble at the feet of the stairs-"L'Ame passionée" and "l'Ame Heroique" but Bourdelle executed several paintings for the theatre ceiling. One of the reliefs on the building's façade "La Sculpture et l’Architecture" celebrates the interrelationship of the two art forms of architecture and sculpture, something that concerned Bourdelle deeply who saw sculpture as architectural. Apollo and three of the nine muses. One of Bourdelle's reliefs on the front of the Théâtre des Champs-Élysées
"Sappho"	Montauban	1925	This work in bronze stands in front of Montauban's Théâtre Olympe-de-Gouges in the Place de la Comédie. The plaster version can be seen in the Musée Bourdelle. Bourdelle first worked on this composition in 1887 and reworked it in 1924 but on a larger scale. Two versions were exhibited in the Pavillon du Livre at the Musée des Arts Décoratifs in 1925, including the 1925 bronze version in Montauban cast by the Fonderie de Coubertin based in Saint-Rémy-lès-Chevreuse and being 2.08m high. When adding his monogram to the work, Bourdelle added the dates "1887–1925". Bourdelle's "Sappho" in Montauban
"Beethoven:Tete chapitaux aux raisins"	Musee Ingres-Bourdelle	1924	Towards the end of his life, Bourdelle returned to studies of Beethoven with this study with the composer framed by grapes and vines. At this time he also executed his "Beethoven, a l'Architecture" the composer's head emerging from a block of stone. "Beethoven La Pathétique" dates to the same period "Beethoven:Tete chapitaux aux raisins"
Monument to Honoré Daumier	Marseille	1949	Bourdelle executed preliminary sketches for a monument to Honoré Daumier from 1925 to 1927 and in 1927 created a 1.13m high composition which depicted the artist clutching his lithographic stone. He did not in fact receive the commission but the head was subsequently scaled up further, well after Bourdelle's death, and this now sits on a high pedestal in Marseille's Place Daviel.
