= Capoulet-et-Junac War Memorial =

Public sculpture by Antoine Bourdelle

Coordinates: 42.79227°N 1.57849°E

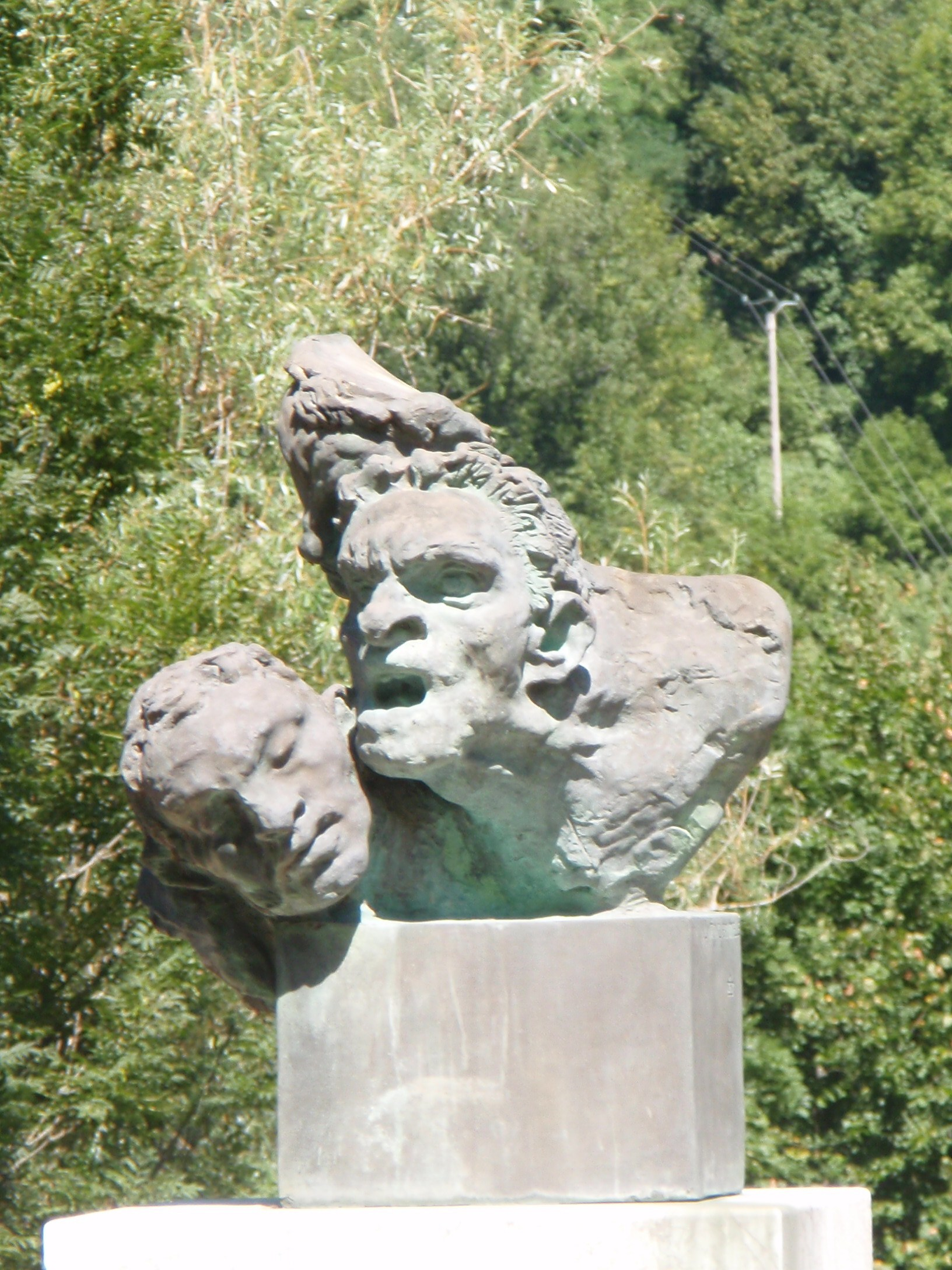
The War Memorial of Capoulet-et-Junac

The War Memorial of Capoulet-et-Junac, located in the department of Ariège, France, is a sculpture by Antoine Bourdelle. This monument was installed in 1936 at the initiative of the mayor of Capoulet-et-Junac, Paul Voivenel.

== History ==
These three figures were first exhibited in 1899 under the title La Guerre, les figures hurlantes (The War, the Screaming Figures). They represent fear, suffering, and death. They were created as part of the project for the Monument aux Morts de Montauban of 1870 (1894–1902). Ultimately not used in the Montauban monument, this sculpture gained an independent existence.

In 1935, the mayor of Capoulet-et-Junac, Paul Voivenel, requested permission from the widow of his friend Antoine Bourdelle (who had died in 1929) to reproduce a work for the purpose of creating the war memorial in his town. He chose a sculpture initially intended to be incorporated into the Montauban monument. The bronze was cast by the Rudier foundry.

The monument was inaugurated on 17 November 1935 by Philippe Pétain, who had known Paul Voivenel at the General Headquarters of Joseph Joffre during World War I. During the inauguration, Marshal Pétain delivered a speech known as the Paysan Speech, which foreshadowed his 1941 speech in Pau.

== Paul Voivenel's Vision of War ==
The war profoundly affected Paul Voivenel, as reflected in the closing lines of his war diary:

"War and humanity are two things that do not belong together. War is inhuman in its essence, its purpose, and its means. From afar, we make grand speeches and splendid descriptions. It ends with

To die for one's country
Is the most beautiful fate
The most enviable

Up close, it's despicable. War is horrible. It cannot be codified, or at least it can only be codified in peacetime. It happens, it is won or lost." (With the 67th D.R, Volume IV, p. 152)

== See also ==
- List of works by Antoine Bourdelle
