= Collège-lycée Jacques-Decour =

School in Paris, France

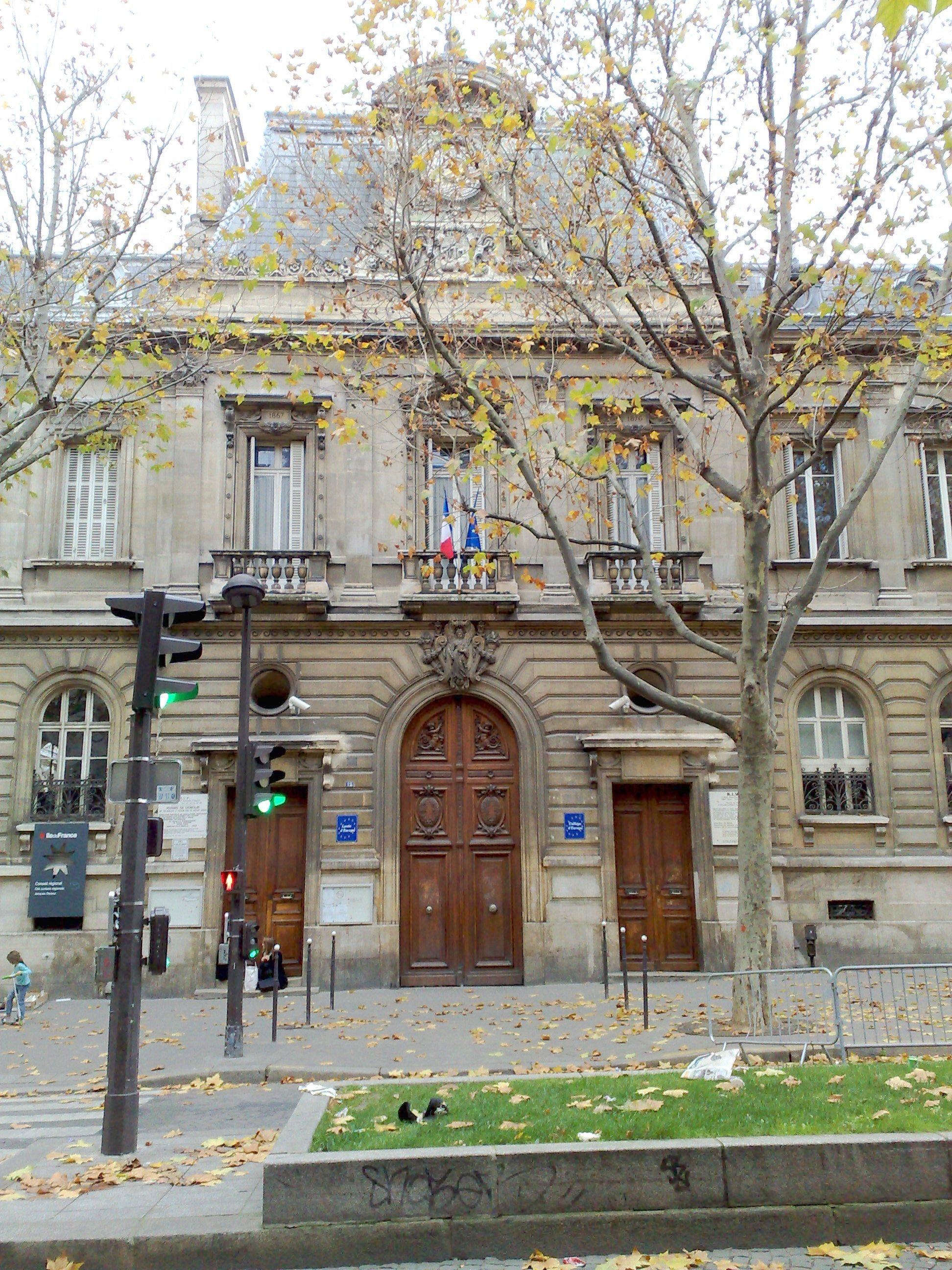
- Collège-lycée Jacques-Decour, Avenue Trudaine

Location
- 12 avenue Trudaine, Paris; France
- Coordinates: 48°52′54″N 2°20′40″E

Information
- Former names: Collège Sainte-Barbe; Collège Rollin; Lycée Rollin
- Established: 1821
- Website: Official website

The Collège-lycée Jacques-Decour (French pronunciation: [kɔlɛʒ lise ʒak dəkuʁ]) is a school in Paris, France, on avenue Trudaine.

== History ==
The school was founded as the private Collège Sainte-Barbe in 1821 and renamed Collège Rollin in 1830. It was transplanted in 1876 from the Quartier Latin to avenue Trudaine, near Montmartre. The old building on rue Lhomond became the site of the Protestant Faculty of Theology in Paris in 1877. Collège Rollin was granted municipal status, and became Lycée Rollin in 1919. It is the only secondary school in Paris to have taken the name of a former teacher, Jacques Decour, a French Resistance fighter in 1944.

== Selected alumni ==
- Daniel Bilalian
- Jean de Botton
- Charles Forbes René de Montalembert
- Lucien Lévy
- Benoît Mandelbrot
- Édouard Manet
- Félix Ravaisson
- Georges Sorel
