= Jean de Botton =

French artist (1898–1978)

Jean Isy de Botton (born June 20, 1898, in Thessaloniki, Greece; died June 13, 1978, in New York City) was a French artist, ballet librettist and designer, lecturer, and teacher.

== Education and early career ==
His parents were from Royan. In Paris, he studied classics at the Lycée Rollin, received a degree in philosophy, and was a pupil of author Jules Romains.

His parents intended a diplomatic career for him, but in 1920, he entered the École des Beaux-Arts de Paris. He studied sculpture under Antoine Bourdelle and painting under Bernard Naudin. He studied fresco painting and worked as an assistant to Paul Baudoüin. De Botton's father remarked, "I have two children and a painter!"

In 1924, he made his first trip to Spain, where he studied the work of Zurbaran and El Greco.

From 1925, he exhibited at the Salon des Indépendants and at the Salon d'Automne, becoming a member and serving on the Jury in 1929. He also exhibited at the Salon des Tuileries, the Salon des humoristes, and the Salon des artistes décorateurs.

In 1931, he made his first trip to Portugal, where he studied Portuguese ceramics. In 1933, he made his first trip to Italy, where he returned yearly. His second trip in 1933 was a critical watershed in his artistic career, as his "untarnished adoration" of Piero della Francesca made him

realize the triumph of Color over Chiaroscuro...When he returns to his Paris studio, the artist destroys his entire past production, burning about three hundred and fifty pictures. On a blank page he starts the new period of crystallization, which is characterized by the lack of any trace of romanticism in conception as well as in technique.

In 1932, he was appointed Chef d'Atelier at the Académie Montmontre, where he taught until 1939; his inaugural lecture was titled "The Vanity of Teaching Art."

In 1936, he made his first trip to England, leading the exhibition France Nouvelle under the official patronage of the French government. The success of this show led to his Royal invitation the next year to be the only foreign painter to attend the coronation of King George VI in an official capacity and to paint numerous of the participants as well as "a canvas, thirty-foot long, depicting scenes of the coronation...to be placed in Windsor Castle."

Also in 1937, he painted fresco murals for the Musée de la Marine in Paris, under the theme History of Sailing Through the Ages: From Slavery to Sports.

In 1938, he made his first trip to the United States, showing studies for his depictions of the coronation at the British Empire Building in Rockefeller Center. He also exhibited at the Carroll Carstairs Galleries in New York and arranged for a series of exhibits at galleries in Seattle, Philadelphia, San Diego, and Boston.

Returning to England, de Botton began work on a monumental Royal commission to be titled King George VI and His Court, "an historical series of Court ceremonies and synoptic recordings of the pageantry of the Life at St. James as well as throughout the country and the Empire." Thirty-two of sixty projected compositions had been completed when World War II began and de Botton hastened back to France.

== World War II; de Botton in San Francisco ==
He enlisted as a private and served in Morocco, where he discovered "Arab architecture, Muslim interlacing, earthenware panels with floral decoration, the colorful shadows dear to Delacroix and the sumptuous contrasts of tones that had so seduced Matisse. His palette, muffled by the English grayness, warms up, his color rises several registers, his impasto is impregnated with sensuality."

Demobilized in Morocco in 1940, he traveled to New York and then across the United States, acting as a goodwill ambassador for France; whether such a role was assigned to him officially is unclear. In New York, he met with other artists and intellectuals who had fled France, including Jules Romains, André Maurois, Saint-John Perse, Fernand Léger, Salvador Dalí, and Amédée Ozenfant.

His two extended stays in San Francisco were especially fruitful. The Legion of Honor museum, an institution with close cultural ties to France, staged a major exhibit, resulting in the illustrated catalogue Jean de Botton: Retrospective (1944).

Included in Retrospective was a lecture delivered by de Botton at the San Francisco Museum of Modern Art, "Chiaroscuro Killed Painting," an artistic manifesto and cri de guerre in which de Botton denounced the course of European paintings since Rembrandt, calling for a return to the primacy of color over the contrasts of light and shadow and extolling the achievement of Cezanne: "Cézanne came. And with the invincible obstinacy of a modest French bourgeois gifted with genius, he gave to the painting of today the gamut of its duties. He scared darkness away, and rebuilt the Pictural Universe on colored planes—those planes it should never have left." De Botton also took inspiration from Manet, Seurat, Gauguin, and Van Gogh, as well as "the primitives and the Byzantines."

Ernest Hemingway was also in San Francisco in the early 1940s and collected work by de Botton. De Botton made several paintings depicting views of the city and of San Francisco Bay, including San Francisco from Ernest Hemingway's Window.

In San Francisco he also painted the 12-by-25 foot America at War, a panoramic celebration of America's wartime industry dominated by a full-length portrait of Henry J. Kaiser holding a set of blueprints.

Less successful was his collaboration with the San Francisco Ballet, The Triumph of Hope, set to music by César Franck and staged at the War Memorial Opera House with a full orchestra and fifty dancers. De Botton designed the costumes and backdrops and wrote the libretto, an homage to the shared values of America and France, "couched...in abstract language and high-flown rhetoric," with dancers portraying archetypes including "Man, Woman, the Child Hope, Satan, and personifications of the forces of good and evil...Wartime shortages cramped the production's style," diminishing the grand theatrical effects conceived by de Botton. "But the greatest weakness of The Triumph of Hope was that its abstractions were not easily made coherent in dance...the depiction of grandiose themes too often sank into obvious trivialization or curious abstractions." One critic at least was entertained, writing that "Satan...triumphed in the matter of providing excitement and holding interest, for the handsome and agile demon...directed one of the most wondrous orgies ever staged at the Opera."

Capping his goodwill tour of the States, de Botton illustrated and authored (in both English and French) a children's book published in San Francisco in 1945, Fou Fou Discovers America, the story of a French poodle whose travels mirrored his own.

== After World War II ==
After the war, de Botton remained in the United States and became a naturalized citizen. He returned to France with a retrospective at the Wildenstein Gallery in Paris in 1956, followed the next year by a major exhibition at the Knoedler Gallery in New York, and thereafter spent half of each year in Paris and half in New York.

His later work, which de Botton called "Humanized Abstraction," was showcased in the book Jean de Botton by Frank Elgar (1968). In these later works, Elgar wrote, de Botton,

who had painted many of them, definitively renounced the portrait and the female nude. When he is not executing imaginary landscapes and still lifes, it is from music, about which he is passionate, that he looks for his inspiration. And since music is, in essence, a subjective and abstract art that rejects imitation and description, it is logical that the canvases that proceed from it are anti-naturalist, that they draw the viewer into the realm of dreams and fantasy.

"What makes de Botton important," the British critic Eric Newton wrote, are his

hitherto undiscovered harmonies of color...a complex chord of colour that takes incredible risks and yet is always triumphant. Jean de Botton can dance on the very edge of the precipice with his daring juxtapositions of colour that are never simple, never obvious, always gay, yet always a little surprising....One trembles to see him taking such risks, yet he never makes a false step....He is a poet of hope, not of despair. Yet his optimism is not sentimental or sweet. It is robust and daring. But because behind his romantic elegance there is a hard, classic structure, these paintings will endure. They are as gay as a jewelled necklace, but as firmly constructed as the safe that contains it.

In the 1950s and 1960s de Botton became an international artist, with exhibitions in the United States including Philadelphia, New York, Boston, San Francisco, Chicago, Detroit, Phoenix, Atlanta, Fort Worth, Palm Beach, Dallas, the University of Maine, and Adelphi University; in Europe, including London, Geneva, Osnabrück, Hamm, Cologne, Salzburg, Munich, Vienna, Monaco, Nice, and Paris.

His paintings were collected by Ernest Hemingway, Queen Elizabeth II, Winston Churchill, Jules Romains, Paul Valéry, and Charlie Chaplin.

Museums and public collections holding his works included the Smithsonian American Art Museum, the Metropolitan Museum of Art in New York, the Fogg Museum at Harvard, the Phoenix Art Museum, the High Museum of Art in Atlanta, the Albertina in Vienna, the Musée de l'Histoire de France at Versailles, and, in Paris, the Musée du Luxembourg, the Musée National d'Art Moderne, and the Centre national des arts plastiques.

De Botton was a member of the jury of the Salon d'Automne, member of the Salon des Tuileries, member of the Salon des Indépendants, workshop manager of the Académie Montmontre (in 1969), vice-president of the Salon Moderne, and president of the Salon France Nouvelle.

== Blindness and death ==
Blindness prevented him from painting after 1973. He died in 1978 in New York City. He once said, "Painting is the language that allows us to talk to the hereafter." And also: "Death is anxiety only when it interrupts the work. It becomes welcome when you have nothing more to say."

== Auction record: 1931 Joséphine Baker nude ==
An auction record for a work by de Botton was set in 2021 by the nude portrait Joséphine Baker, auctioned by Ader at Drouot in Paris for EUR 179,200 (including fees). When the painting was first shown at the Salon d'Automne in 1931, among 2,750 works, it was the "cynosure for all eyes." The timing of the 2021 auction took advantage of a flurry of interest in Josephine Baker in the French press as she was about to be honored by the symbolic reburial of her remains at the Panthéon in Paris. The success of the auction "pays homage to the painter and restores the artist to the height of his notoriety," and the "portrait presents itself more than ever as a manifesto of freedom, still relevant today."

Two drawings by de Botton depicting Josephine Baker, also from 1931, are conserved at the Musée franco-américain du château de Blérancourt.

== Sources ==
- Bénézit, E., et al. "Botton, Jean Isy de" entry (pp. 948-949) in Dictionary of Artists, vol. 2, Gründ, 2006.
- Botton, Jean de, illustrations and text in French and English. Fou Fou Discovers America, San Francisco: Les Arts De France, 1945.
- Elgar, Frank. Jean de Botton, including essays by Elgar, Eric Newton, Hans Widrich, and Hans Maria Wingler, and the French text of de Botton's "Le Clair-obscur a tué la Peinture" and "Réflexions par Jean de Botton," Paris: Georges Fall, 1968.
- Jean de Botton, Retrospective: Paintings, Frescoes, Murals, Drawings, Tapestries, Stage Settings, Ballets, Book Illustrations, exhibition catalogue, San Francisco: California Palace of the Legion of Honor, 1944.
- Karel, David. "Botton, Jean Isy de" entry (p. 104) in Dictionnaire des artistes de langue française en Amérique du Nord, Musée du Québec, Les Presses de L'Université Laval, 1992.
- New York Times obituary, "Jean de Botton, an Abstract Painter", June 14, 1978, p D21.
- Sowell, Debra Hickenlooper. The Christensen Brothers: An American Dance Epic, Australia: Harwood Academic Publishers, 1998.
- Turpin, Georges. "Le Salon d'Automne 1931", Revue littéraire, artistique, théâtrale et sportive (Paris), December, 1931, pp. 6–13.
