= Emile Lahner =

Emile Lahner (28 September 1893 – 14 December 1980) was a Hungarian-born painter who moved to Paris in 1924 and became part of the School of Paris, a group of international artists working in Paris between 1900 and 1940.

Lahner was born in 1893 in the village of Nagyberezna in Carpathian Ruthenia, in the Ung County of the Kingdom of Hungary (present-day Ukraine). Lahner's mother died in childbirth and he became an orphan at the age of seven when his father was killed in an accident. Placed in the care of a bishop guardian, he was sent to boarding school to begin training as an engineer. Lahner abandoned his engineering career in 1921 and enrolled in the School of Fine Arts in Budapest where he studied under János Vaszary, a seminal figure in the Art Nouveau movement.

During World War I, neighboring Romania and the new Soviet Republic sacked much of Hungary. The subsequent "Red Terror" and "White Terror" ensued and thousands were either jailed or killed. In this harshly repressive atmosphere, many artists and intellectuals, including Lahner, were forced to flee their homeland or chose to emigrate. Lahner decided in 1924 to move to Paris where he could study the modern masters, Delacroix, Van Gogh and Monet.

Lahner arrived in Paris in 1924 residing in Montmartre. He studied with artist Antoine Bourdelle and worked as a painter for Paris theaters and movie producers. He developed set designs for the filmmaker Alexander Korda.

As the Third Reich rolled across Europe, Lahner joined many artists who took refuge in Vichy France in the Dordogne. He explored Dordogne's famous cave paintings that inspired a series of primitivist paintings.

After the liberation of Paris in 1945, Lahner returned to rue des Perichaux where he began to exhibit his work more frequently. In 1948 he made his first of many trips to Algeria where the Averseng family commissioned him, to design a chapel for the town of El Affroun. This assignment provided an opportunity for Lahner to participate in the fascination with chapel construction and adornment that was then popular in France.

Lahner's exploration of stained glass and its refractive properties during this project had a profound impact on the remainder of his abstract work.

In 1951 he visited the artist Pablo Picasso in Vallauris, whom he eventually exhibited with at Galerie Daniel Malingue in Paris.

In 1957, at the age of 64, Lahner married Jeanne Cazenave. Following his marriage, Lahner moved from his spartan studio of twenty-five years on rue des Perichaux to an apartment on rue Alfred-Stevens, near the Place Pigalle. In 1959 he met an American art dealer from California named Laszlo Laky. Mr. Laky became one of the artist's closest friends and supporters.

In the spring of 1961 Lahner received critical success in a watershed exhibition at the Galerie Jeanne Castel. This exhibition was under the patronage of Lahner's old friend, Léopold Sédar Senghor, a well-known poet and the former president of Senegal.

From the 1960s until his death in 1980, Lahner continued to exhibit. He was known for his wide breadth of stylistic exploration, informed through his early exposure to the Art Nouveau, Constructivist, Synthetic, and Non-objective art movements in Eastern Europe. While living in Paris, he was greatly influenced by Post-Impressionism, Fauvism, Cubism, and Primitivism. Lahner's close friends included artists and writers Jean Bouret, Léopold Sédar Senghor, Jean Trichet, Marcel Sauvage, and André Masson.
