= Monument aux Morts de Montauban =

Public sculpture by Antoine Bourdelle in Montauban

Coordinates: 44°01′02″N 1°21′05″E

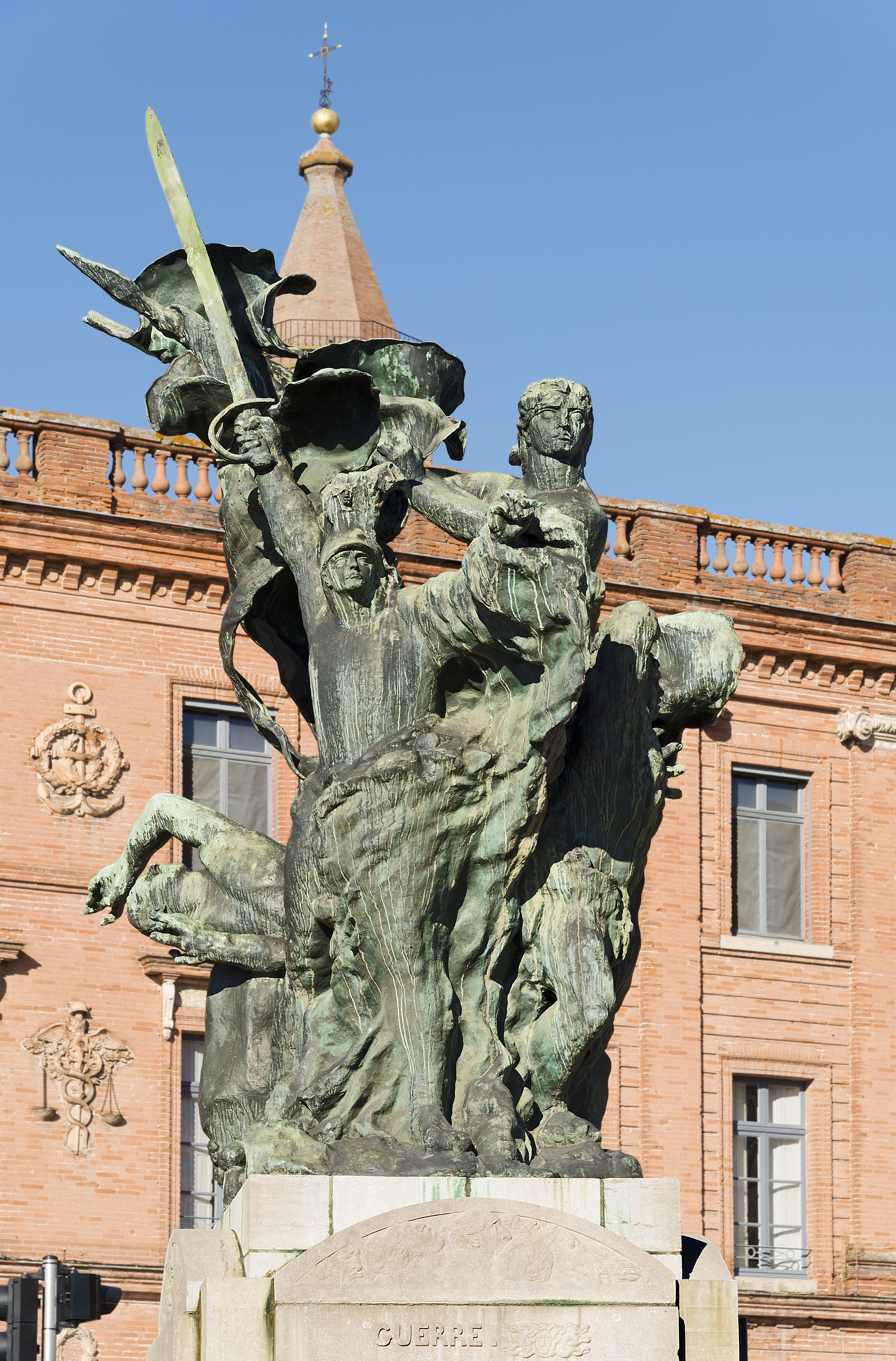
The monument, Montauban

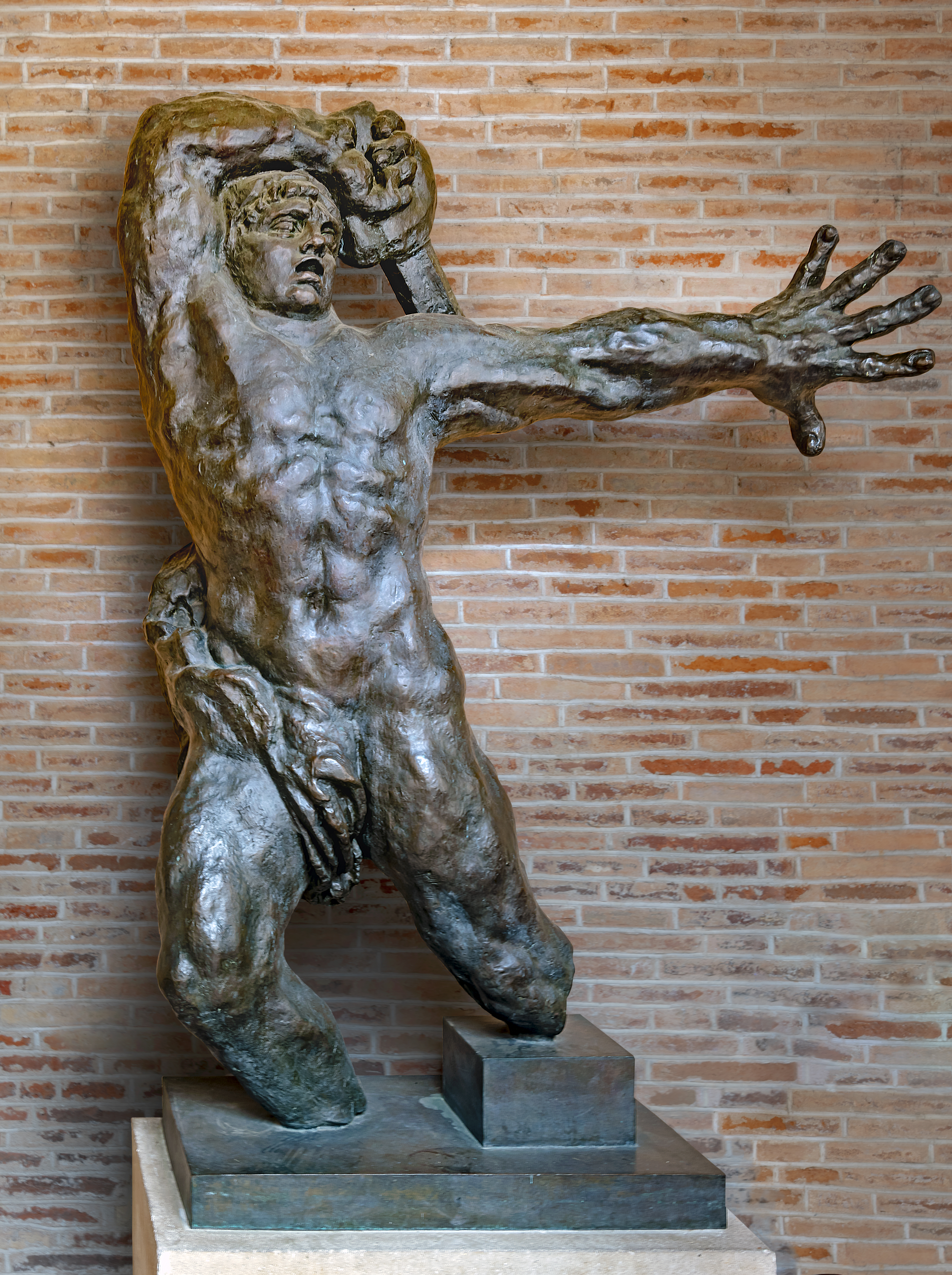
Study for the Monument, Fondation Bemberg, Toulouse

The Monument aux Morts de Montauban is an 1894 bronze sculpture by Antoine Bourdelle. His romantic vision of the monument generated many violent oppositions. Auguste Rodin's intervention in 1897 enabled Bourdelle to do this sculpture without any compromise. The monument was erected in Montauban, in the department of Tarn-et-Garonne, in 1902.

== See also ==
- List of works by Antoine Bourdelle

== Bibliography ==
- Dossier de l'Art N° 10 de January/February 1993
- Bourdelle by Ionel Jianou and Michel Dufet Edition Arted 1970
- Jardin-musée départemental Bourdelle d'Égreville by Hervé Joubeaux - Conservateur territorial du Patrimoine in May 2005 (ISBN 2-9524413-0-8)
