= Pierre Bourdelle =

French painter, sculptor, and muralist (1861–1929)

- Born: Pierre Bourdelle; 1903; Paris, France
- Died: 1966 (aged 62–63); Geneva, Switzerland
- Known for: Sculpture, Murals
- Parent(s): Antoine Bourdelle, Stephanie Van Parys

Pierre Bourdelle (1903 – 1966), was a French sculptor, muralist, and teacher. The son of noted French sculptor Antoine Bourdelle, he was educated from a young age in his father's studio, and studied at the Sorbonne and the College of France. Upon his father's death he immigrated to the United States where he became known for his large scale muralwork and use of novel materials such as cement, Lucite, and Plexiglass. He was artist-in-residence at C.W. Post College, part of Long Island University, from 1958 until his death.

His artistic output includes large-scale murals in hotels, churches, and railway stations; smaller murals and bas-relief works in offices, hotels, railway dining cars and lounges; sculptures in metal, clay, and stone; and mixed-media pieces combining metal, glass, plastic, and other materials. Bourdelle was commissioned to produce work for several international expositions including the 1936 Texas Centennial, the 1939 New York World's Fair, and the 1949 Exposition Internationale Port-au-Prince in Haiti. He also designed and produced several relief maps for the American Battle Monuments Commission, for the war monument at Saint-Avold, France. His largest project was for Cincinnati Union Terminal, for which he created more than 5,000 square feet of artwork. He collaborated with other artists on some works, such as a 10' x 30' panoramic painting of the New York City skyline, produced in collaboration with Jacques Maloubier.

He and his wife Ruth had two children, Peter and Stephanie.

== Selected works ==
Unfortunately many of Bourdelle's large-scale public works are now lost due to demolition and/or renovation.

- The Rice, Houston - murals
- American Field Service headquarters - large hand-hammered aluminum sculpture
- Hotel del Prado, Mexico City - murals
- Fair Park, Dallas - bas-relief cement murals
- Canadian Pacific Railway - bas-relief murals for lounge cars and dining cars
- Richard Lansing Conolly memorial, C.W. Post College - metalwork eagle carrying sailing vessel, originally also topped with a large openwork astrological sphere
