= Céline Emilian =

Romanian sculptor (1898-1983)

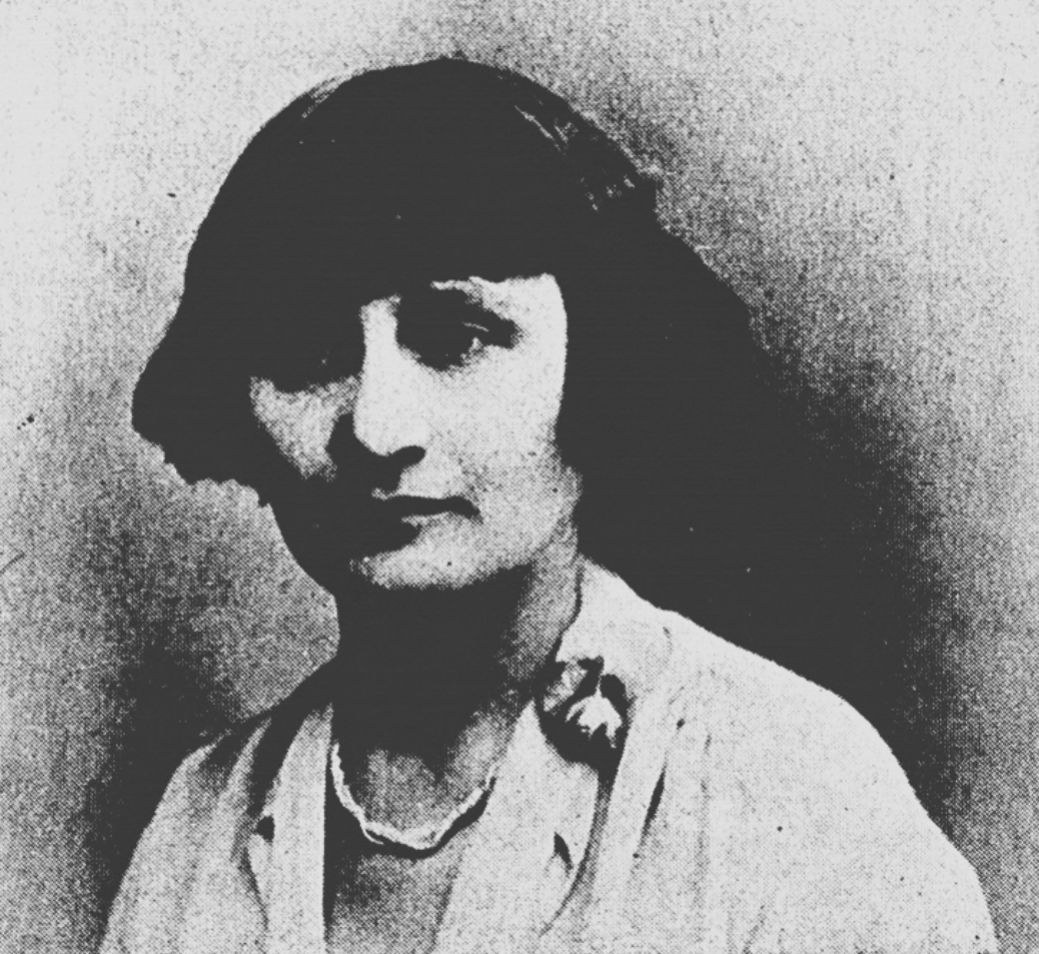
- Emilian in 1927
- Born: 1898; Paris, France
- Died: 1983 (aged 84–85); Bucharest, Romania
- Known for: Sculpture

Céline Emilian (1898–1983) was a French-born Romanian sculptor, notable for her portrait work.

== Biography ==
Emilian was born in Paris to Romanian parents and trained as a sculptor in the Paris studio of Antoine Bourdelle in the early 1920s. She worked as an assistant to Bourdelle for some time before moving to Romania. Emilian would return to Paris each year to work, but also established a studio in Rome, and regularly exhibited at the Salon des Artistes Francais from 1930 onwards.

Emilian represented Romania at the Venice Biennale in both 1934 and 1936 and created relief sculptures for the Romanian Pavilion at the Paris International Exhibition of 1937. Retrospectives of her work were held at Bucharest's Stalin Park during 1957 and at Sala Dalles in 1979. The latter exhibition contained some 132 sculptures, including her portrait busts of Luigi Pirandello, Alfred Cortot, Nicolae Ceaușescu and a statue of Elena Ceaușescu. During her career Emilian also created portraits of Bourdelle, Vincent d'Indy, made bas-reliefs for the Eglise St. Remy at Reims and was commissioned to produce 20 statues of former Romanian queens for a Bucharest park. Her 1930 bronze work, Angela is in the Tate collection in London.
