= Margaret Butler (sculptor) =

New Zealand sculptor (1883–1947)

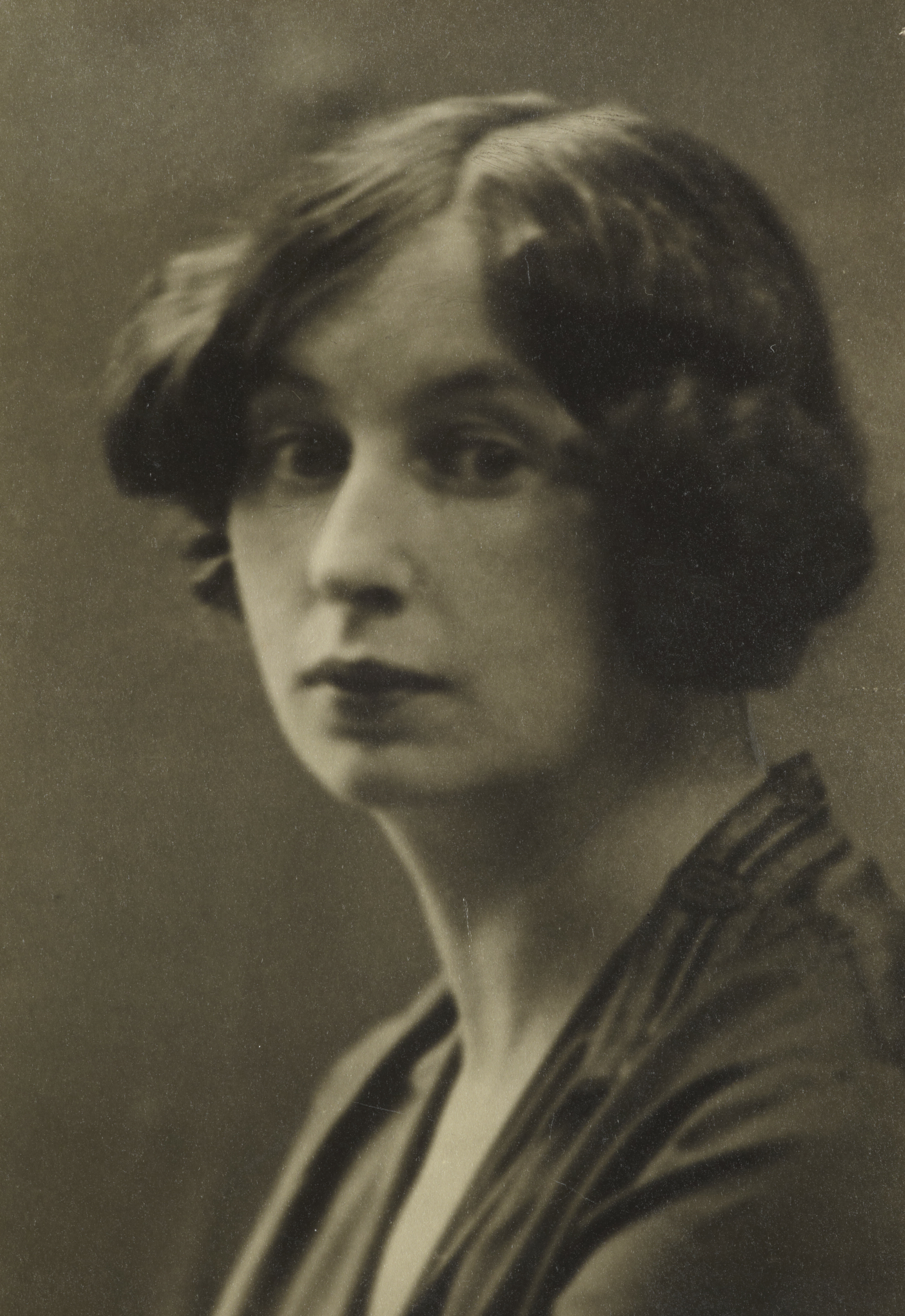
- Born: Margaret Mary Butler; 30 April 1883; Greymouth, New Zealand
- Died: 4 December 1947 (aged 64); Wellington, New Zealand
- Education: St Mary's College, Wellington and Wellington Technical School
- Known for: Sculpture

Margaret Mary Butler (30 April 1883 – 4 December 1947) was a New Zealand sculptor and artist who is regarded as the first New Zealander of European descent to be a sculptor of substance.

== Early life and education ==
Butler was born 30 April 1883 in Greymouth on the West Coast of New Zealand to Edward P Butler, a County civil engineer, and his wife Mary Delaney. After the death of her father the family moved to Wellington where she attended St Mary's College and then Wellington Technical School. There she studied with Joseph Ellis who encouraged his students to pay careful visual attention to the model. Butler trained as a painter and proved to be a talented student having work accepted for the New Zealand International Exhibition in Christchurch in 1906, and regularly showing water colours and sculptures at the New Zealand Academy of Fine Arts from 1917 through to the early 1920s. By this time she was turning from painting to sculpture and in 1921 her bust of Sir William Hall-Jones was shown at the NZAFA and was then accepted for the 1924 British Empire Exhibition in Wembley. In 1923 when Europe was more settled after World War I, Butler now aged 40 left New Zealand with her younger sister Mary to study abroad.

== The years in Europe and the UK ==
For much of the 11 years she was away from New Zealand Butler was in poor health and unable to study or work but the sisters did travel in Europe including nine months in Vienna and visiting Sicily and Switzerland In 1926 they settled in Paris where Butler studied with the sculptor Antoine Bourdelle (who had been a long-time assistant of Auguste Rodin). In 1927 Bourdelle invited her to participate in the Salon des Tuileries and in the same year she showed work at the Salon of the Sociéte des Artistes Français and the Société Nationale des Beaux-Arts. In 1933 they returned to New Zealand but not before Butler was given a solo exhibition featuring 20 of her sculptures at the Galerie Hébrard in Paris. Writing in Le Temps art critic François Thiebault-Sisson noted, ‘This artist has real talent for sculpture. She is gifted, very gifted. One visit to her works in the Hébrard Gallery proves this. This is not the last we shall hear of this artist, who analyses with penetration all the types of humanity that she portrays’.

== Return to New Zealand ==
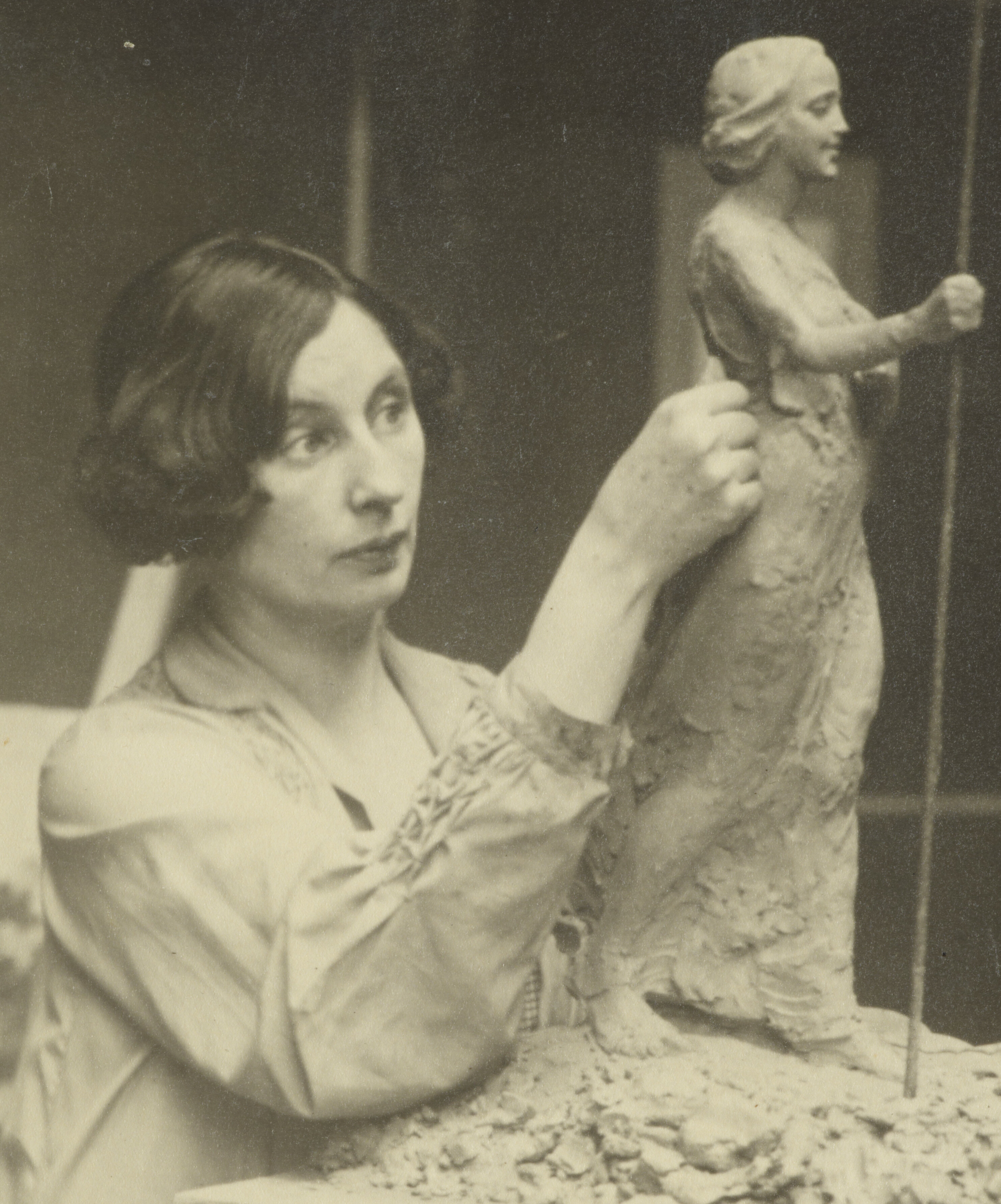
Margaret Butler in 1930

On their return in 1934 Butler was invited to present a solo exhibition at the New Zealand Academy of Fine Arts. At the opening Butler received praise from the Governor General Lord Bledisloe who said of the exhibition and Butler, ‘This exhibition affords me one of the greatest surprises of my sojourn in New Zealand….amid the vagueness and unreality of some modern art it is refreshing to find such work as Miss Butler's… I can vouch for her no better destiny than to achieve in the realm of sculpture what Mr C. F. Goldie has achieved in his pictorial art.’ The exhibition also attracted positive reviews in the local press who claimed Butler as, ‘one of the Empire’s most outstanding sculptors’. Based in Wellington with a studio on the Terrace, Butler continued to show at the Salon des Tuileries in Paris and the Royal Academy in London and in 1940 at the Musée Jeu de Paume. Some of her most notable works at this time were portraits of Māori wahine (women) including La Nouvelle Zélande, Māori Madonna and Kneeling Figure modelled by the famous poi dancer Miriama Heketa. Butler's exhibition of these works at the Salon des Tuileries was the ninth time she had exhibited in this Paris venue. In 1939 the New Zealand Academy of Fine Arts purchased the sculpture Berto which was gifted the following year to the National Art Gallery. More recognition for Butler as a sculptor came in 1940 when La Nouvelle Zélande (titled as New Zealand) was featured in the New Zealand Art exhibition in the Centennial Exhibition in Wellington along with Māori Madonna in the Catholic Pavilion. Despite her reputation Butler was offered few commissions in her lifetime. Art Historian William McAloon attributes this to both her failing health and unwillingness to put herself forward when opportunities arose. One publicly commissioned work in the form of a memorial plaque to Professor H. B. Kirk can still be seen in the biology block at Victoria University.

== Death and legacy ==
Butler died in Wellington on 4 December 1947 four years after her sister Mary. Prime Minister, Peter Fraser and the Catholic archbishop of Wellington, Thomas O'Shea, were among those who attended her funeral. A devout Roman Catholic, she was buried alongside her family in the Catholic section of the Karori cemetery in Wellington. A year after her death the New Zealand High Commissioner in London secured a number of her works. These had been shown in Paris and stored during the war awaiting their return to New Zealand. Along with the other works Butler had bequeathed to the academy they too were gifted to the National Art Gallery collections in 1950 Before the handover they were exhibited at the New Zealand Academy of Fine Arts to mark the occasion. In 2023 Butler's sculpture was included in the exhibition In the Round: Portraits by Women Sculptors at the New Zealand Portrait Gallery.

== Collections ==
Te Papa Tongarewa Museum of New Zealand

Auckland Art Gallery

Dunedin Public Art Gallery
