= Antoine Bourdelle =

French painter and sculptor (1861–1929)

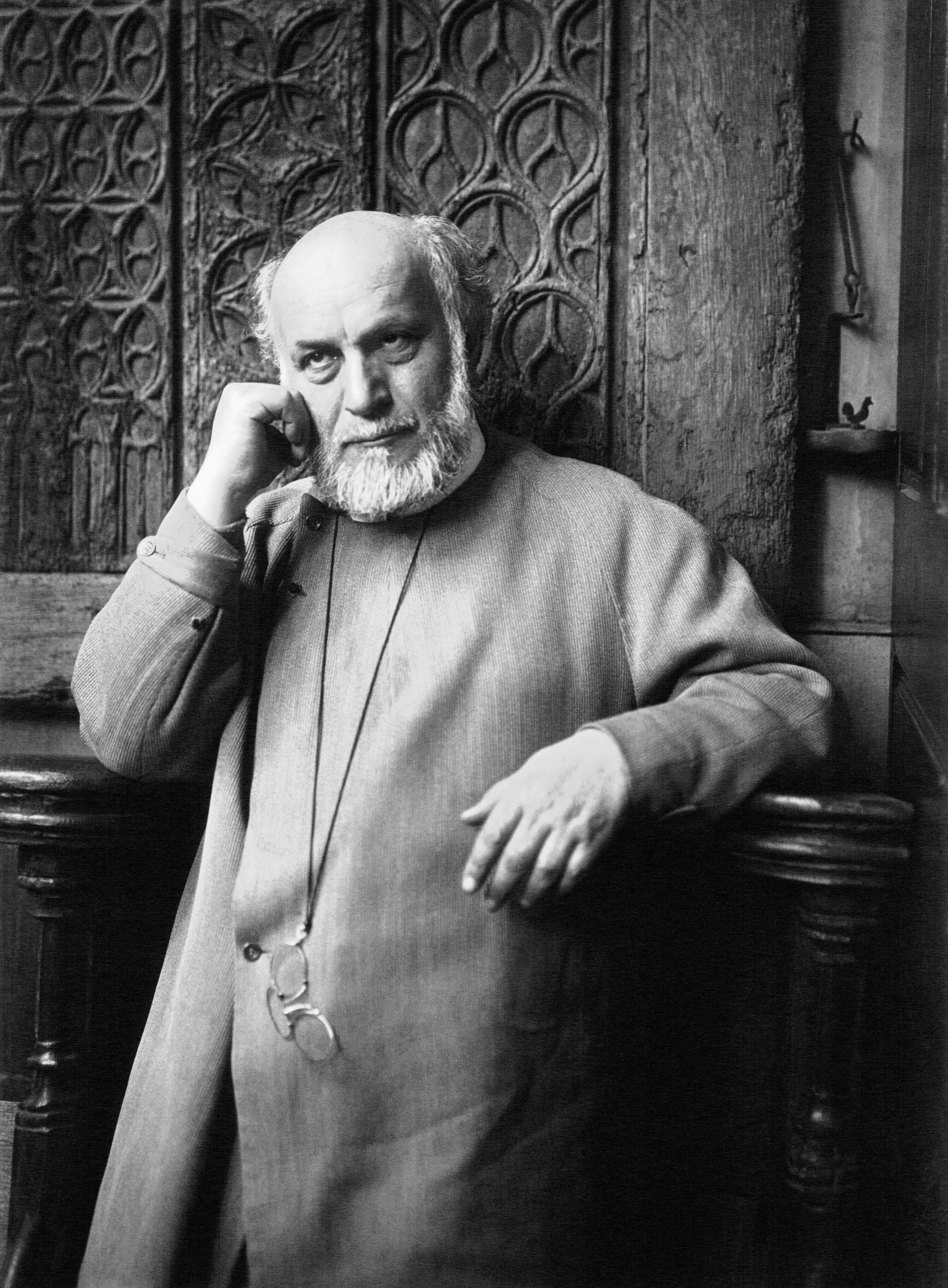
- Antoine Bourdelle (1925)
- Born: Antoine Bourdelle; 30 October 1861; Montauban, France
- Died: 1 October 1929 (aged 67); Le Vésinet, France
- Known for: Sculpture

Signature
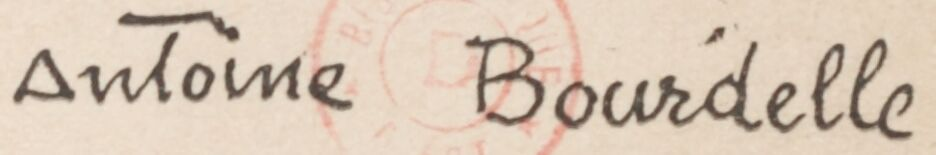

Antoine Bourdelle (French pronunciation: [ɑ̃twan buʁdɛl]; 30 October 1861 – 1 October 1929), born Émile Antoine Bordelles, was a French sculptor and teacher. He was a student of Auguste Rodin, a teacher of Giacometti and Henri Matisse, and an important figure in the Art Deco movement and the transition from the Beaux-Arts style to modern sculpture.

His studio became the Musée Bourdelle, an art museum dedicated to his work, located at 18, rue Antoine Bourdelle, in the 15th arrondissement of Paris, France.

== Early life and education ==
Émile Antoine Bourdelle was born at Montauban, Tarn-et-Garonne, in France on 30 October 1861. His father was a wood craftsman and cabinet-maker. In 1874, at the age of thirteen, he left school to work in his father's workshop, and also began carving his first sculptures of wood.

In 1876, with the assistance of writer Émile Pouvillon, he received a scholarship to attend the School of Fine Arts in Toulouse, though he remained fiercely independent and resisted the formal program. In 1884, at the age of twenty-four, he earned second place in the competition to enter the École des Beaux-Arts in Paris. There he worked in the studio of Alexandre Falguière and frequented the studio of Jules Dalou, who was his neighbor.

== Career ==
In 1885 he participated in the annual Salon of artists and won an honorable mention for his work, The First Victory of Hannibal. He rented a studio at 16 Impasse du Main, next to the painters Eugène Carrière and Jean-Paul Laurens. He worked in this studio until his death.

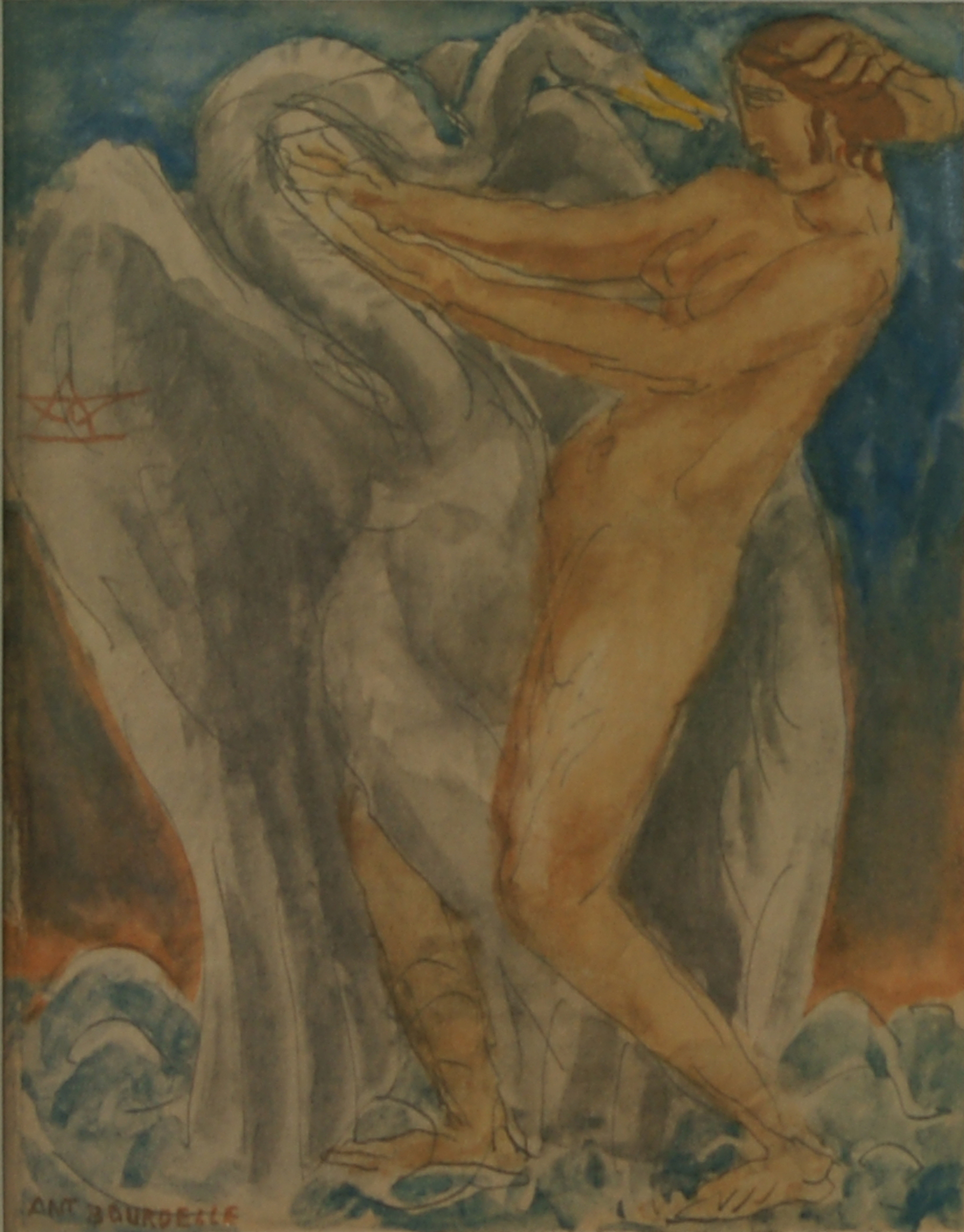
Leda and the Swan, Musée d'Art classique de Mougins

In 1887, he quit the studio of Falguièr, and, moved by the music of Beethoven, he made his first of what would eventually be some forty sculptures of the composer. In September 1893 Bourdelle joined the studio of Auguste Rodin. His collaboration with Rodin lasted fifteen years. In 1895, he received his first official commission, a war monument for the city of Montauban. His proposed plans, different from traditional monuments, created a scandal. Rodin intervened on his behalf, and the monument was finally erected in 1902.

In 1900, Bourdelle demonstrated his independence from Rodin's style with a bust of Apollo. In the same year, Bourdelle, Rodin and the sculptor Desbois opened a free school of sculpture, the Institut Rodin-Debois-Bourdelle. One of the students was Henri Matisse, who later produced some remarkable sculpture, but the school did not last long.

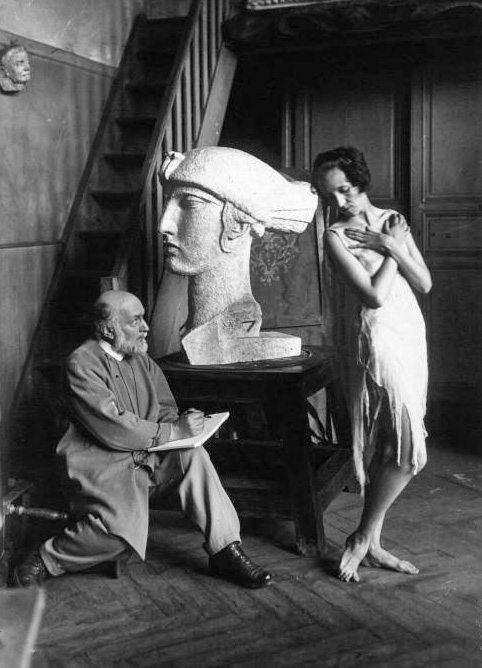
Bourdelle in his studio sketching Grace Christie

In 1905, Bourdelle had his first personal exhibition, in the gallery of the foundry-owner Hébrand. With the support of Hébrand and the material assistance of his foundry, Bourdelle was able to make larger works and earn greater recognition. His father died in 1906, and Bourdelle changed his first name to simply Antoine, after his father. He married his second wife, Cléopatre Sevastos (1892-1972), who was of Greek origin. She and their daughter, Rhodia, became a frequent inspiration for his works.

In 1908, Bourdelle left the studio of Rodin and set out on his own. In 1909 he exhibited a new work, Hercules the Archer at the annual Salon of the Societé Nationale des Beaux-Arts. He began to teach at the Académie de la Grande Chaumière, where his students included Giacometti, Isaac Frenkel and Adaline Kent.

In 1913 the Théâtre des Champs-Élysées was inaugurated, with decoration on the facade and the interior atrium designed by Bourdelle. This work announced the debut of the Art Deco style, and was an important step towards modernism. He was a participant in the 1913 Armory Show in New York, a founder and vice-president of the Parisian Salon des Tuileries. He remained in Paris during the First World War, working on a commission for an art patron from Argentina, Rodolfo Acorta, a monument to General Alvear, which was inaugurated in Buenos Aires in 1925. In 1929, his first major public sculpture in Paris, the monument to the Polish poet Adam Mickiewicz, was inaugurated on place de l'Alma and later, in 1956 relocated to cours Albert-Ier.

== Death and legacy ==
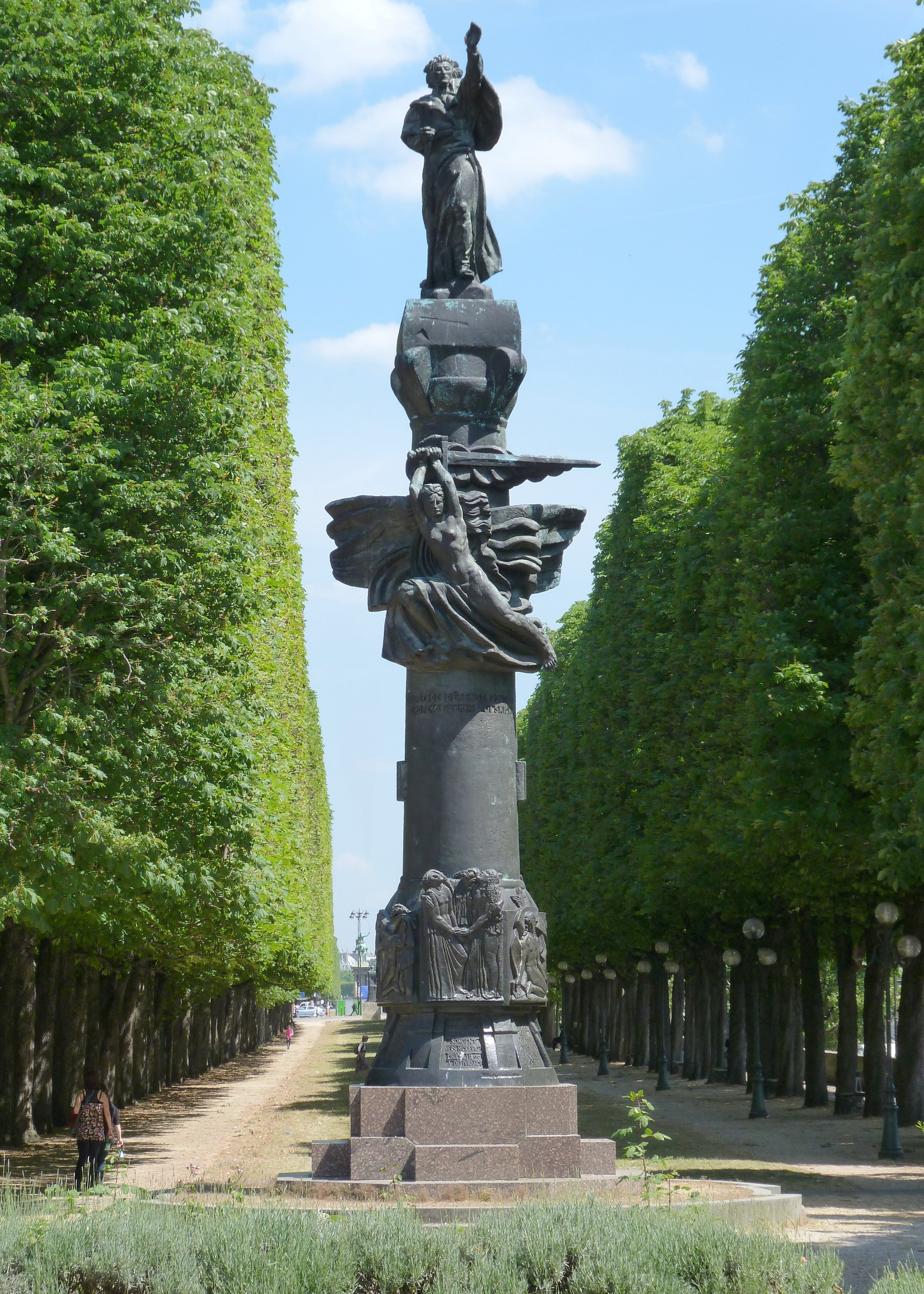
Monument to Adam Mickiewicz, 1929, Jardin d'Erevan, 8th arr., Paris

Bourdelle, in poor health, died at Le Vésinet, near Paris, on 1 October 1929 and was interred in the Cimetière du Montparnasse, Paris, France.

=== Museums ===
Today the Musée Bourdelle in Paris sits amidst brick houses at 18 rue Antoine Bourdelle, a small street between the Gare Montparnasse and the offices of the famous French newspaper Le Monde. The museum consists of Bourdelle's house, studio, and garden where he worked from 1884 to 1929.

In the 1930s his widow opened his art studio for viewings. In 1949, the atelier of Bourdelle was donated by his former spouse Cléopâtre and his daughter to the city of Paris and it was opened as the Musée Bourdelle, additionally the street was renamed as rue Antoine Bourdelle.

A second museum, the Bourdelle Garden-Museum in Égreville, France was established by his daughter and son-in-law starting in 1969 and hosts another 56 of Bourdelle's sculptures in a garden setting.

== Collections ==
His art work is in many public collections worldwide, including Musée d'Orsay (Paris), the National Museum of Western Art (Tokyo), List Visual Arts Center at MIT (Cambridge, Massachusetts), Harvard University Art Museums (Cambridge, Massachusetts), Cleveland Museum of Art, National Museum of Art of Romania, Fine Arts Museums of San Francisco, Courtauld Institute of Art (London), Galleria Nazionale d'Arte Moderna (Rome), Hermitage Museum (Saint Petersburg, Russia), Hirshhorn Museum and Sculpture Garden (Washington D.C.), Honolulu Museum of Art, Kimbell Art Museum (Fort Worth, Texas), Kröller-Müller Museum (Otterlo, Netherlands), the Minneapolis Institute of Art, Museo Nacional de Bellas Artes (Buenos Aires), the National Galleries of Scotland, National Gallery of Australia, Musée Ingres (Montauban), the Royal Museums of Fine Arts of Belgium, Middelheim Open Air Sculpture Museum (Antwerp, Belgium), and the Museum of Fine Arts (St. Petersburg, Florida), among others.

== Personal life ==
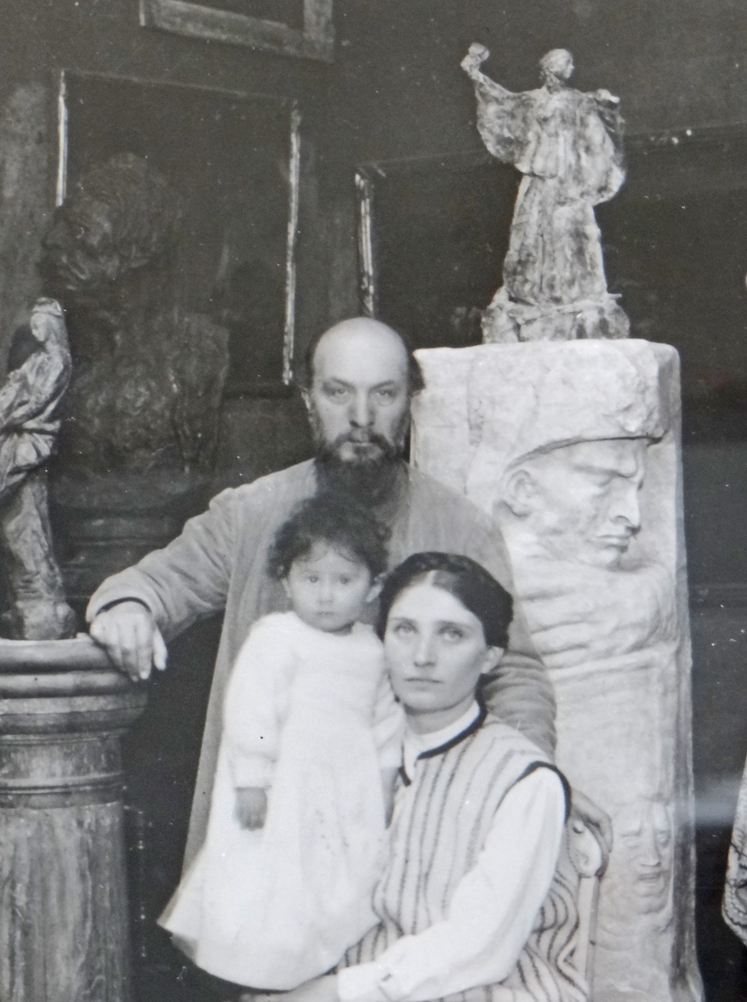
Photo (c. 1913) of Antoine Bourdelle with spouse Cléopâtre Sevastos, and daughter Rhodia Dufet Bourdelle.

In 1904, Bourdelle married artist Stephanie van Parys (also known as Vanparys, 1877–1945). His wife often served as a model for Bourdelle; by 1910 they had divorced. Together with van Parys they had a son, Pierre Bourdelle (c.1903–1966) and Pierre became an artist most active in the United States, and notable for his work at Cincinnati Union Terminal in 1933.

Bourdelle married in 1918 his former art student, Cléopâtre Sevastos (1882–1972), who also served as his model. Together with Sevastos they had a daughter, Rhodia Bourdelle (her married name was Dufet, Dufet–Bourdelle, 1911–2002) and she was an art curator.

== Honors ==
In 1909 he was named Knight of the Legion of Honor, in 1919 Officier of the Legion of Honor, and in 1924 became a Commander of the Legion of Honor.

== Sculpture ==
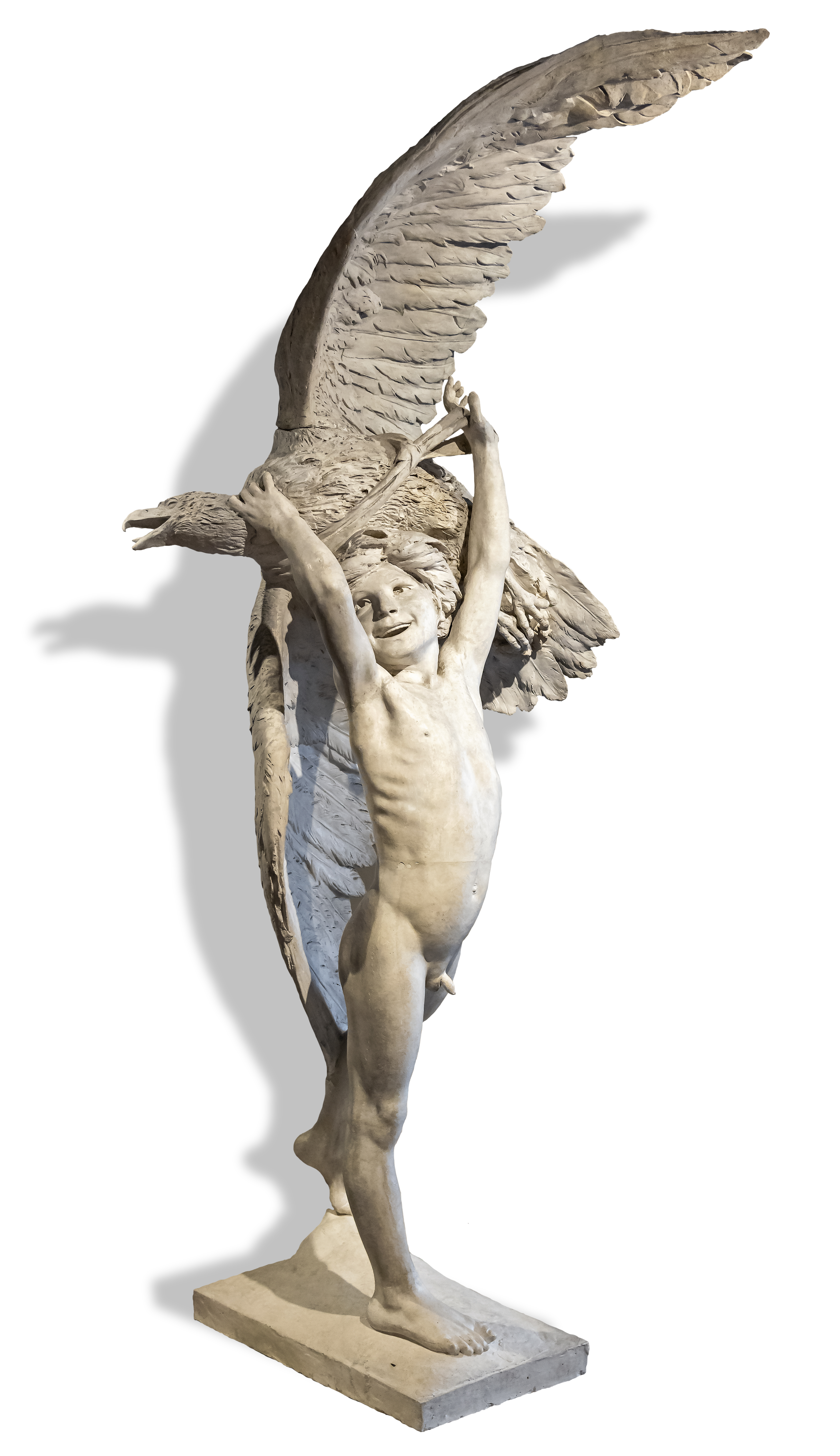
Hannibal's First Victory Original Plaster (1885)

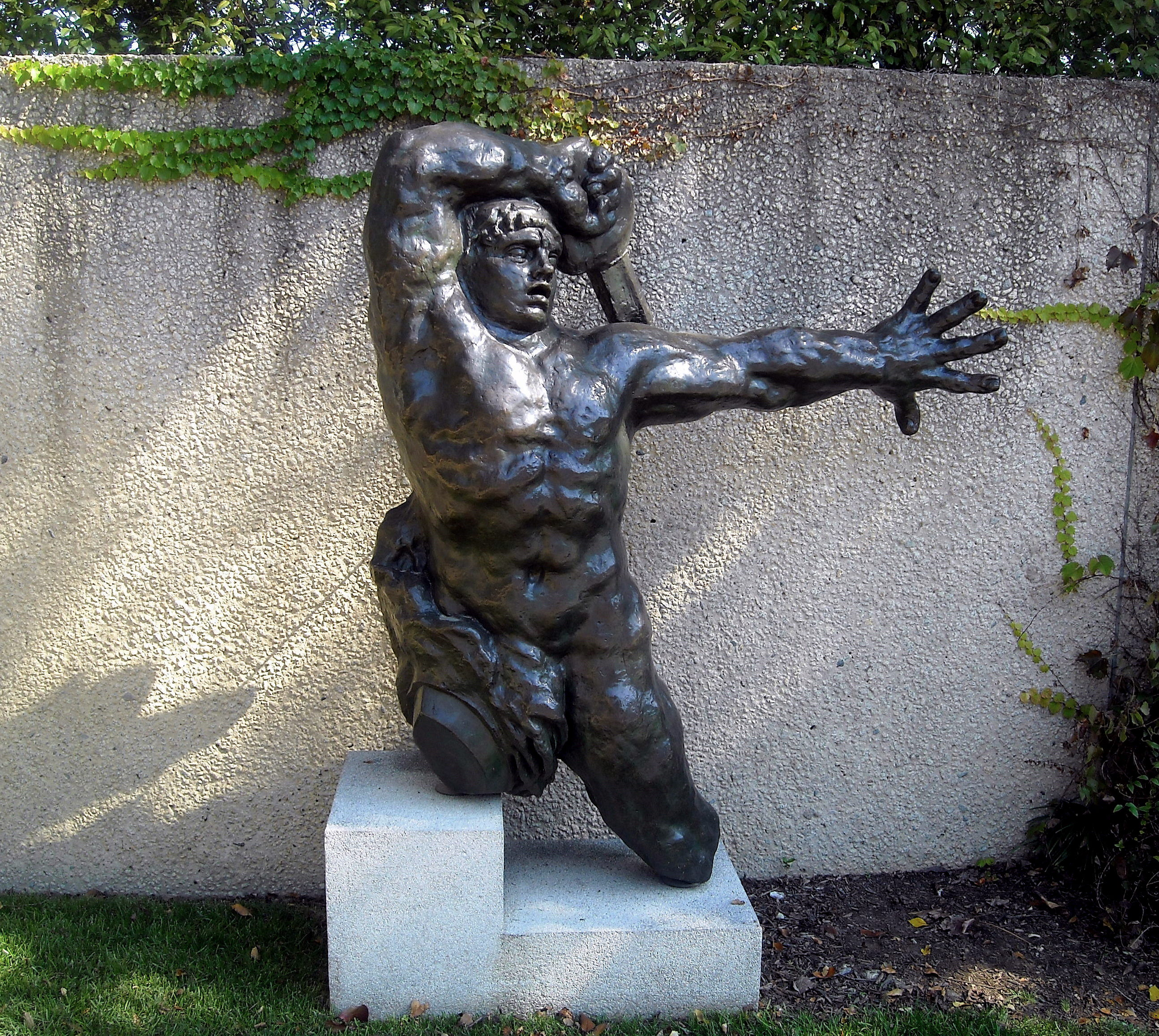
The Great Warrior of Montauban, bronze, (1898), Hirshhorn Museum, Washington, D.C.

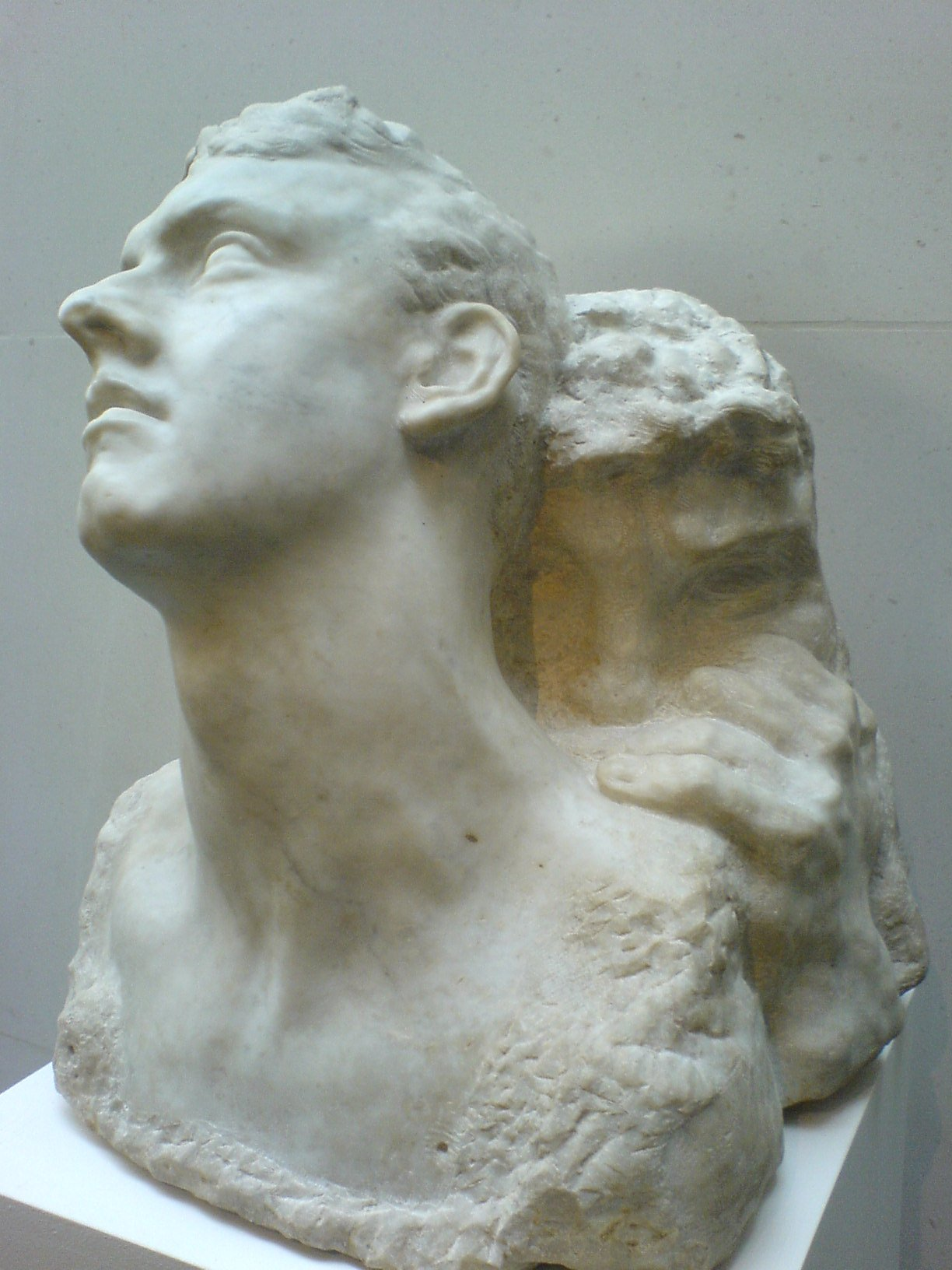
Day and Night, marble, 1903, Musée Bourdelle, Paris

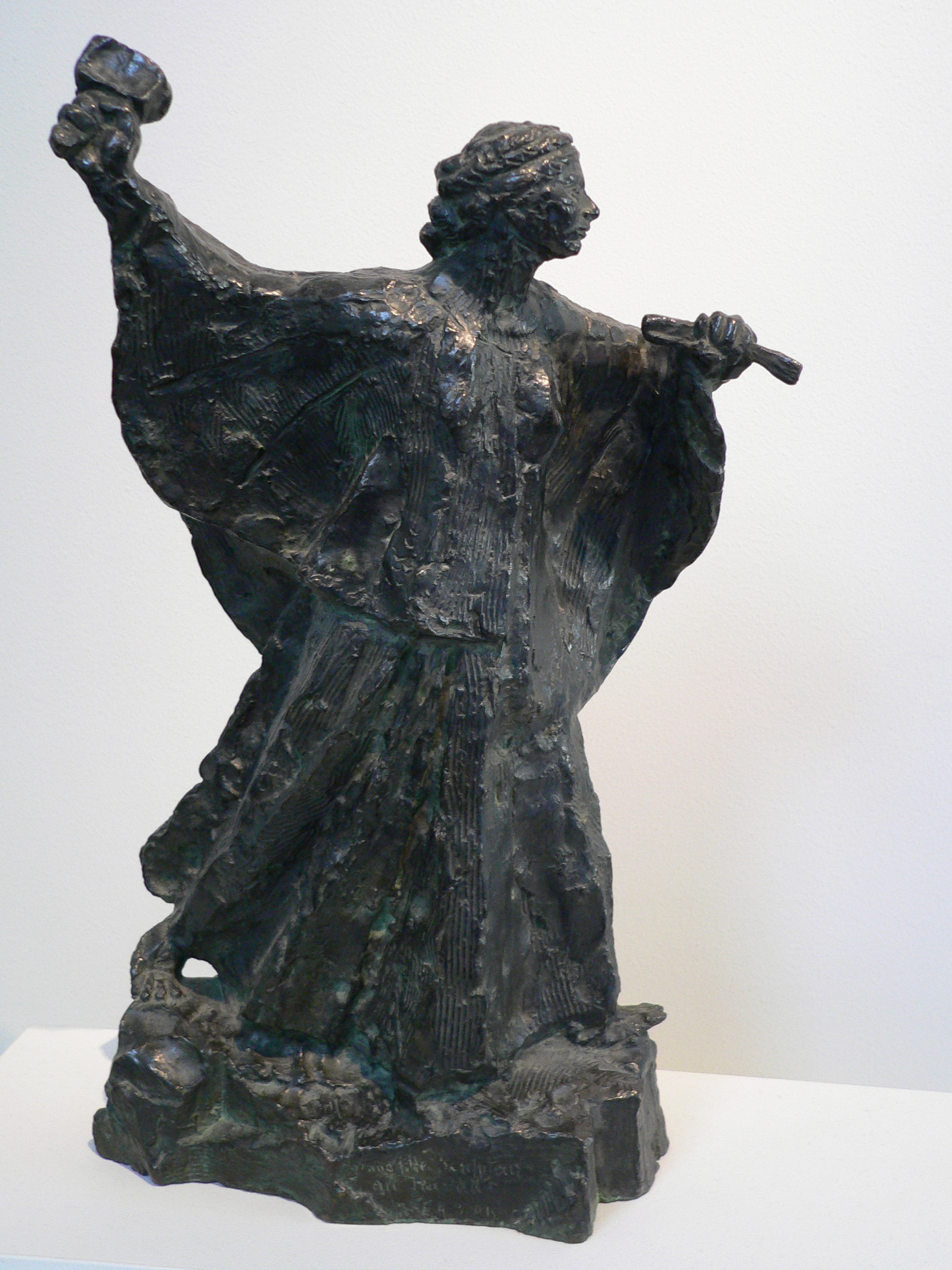
The Sculptress at Work, 1906, bronze, Stanford Museum, Stanford University, California

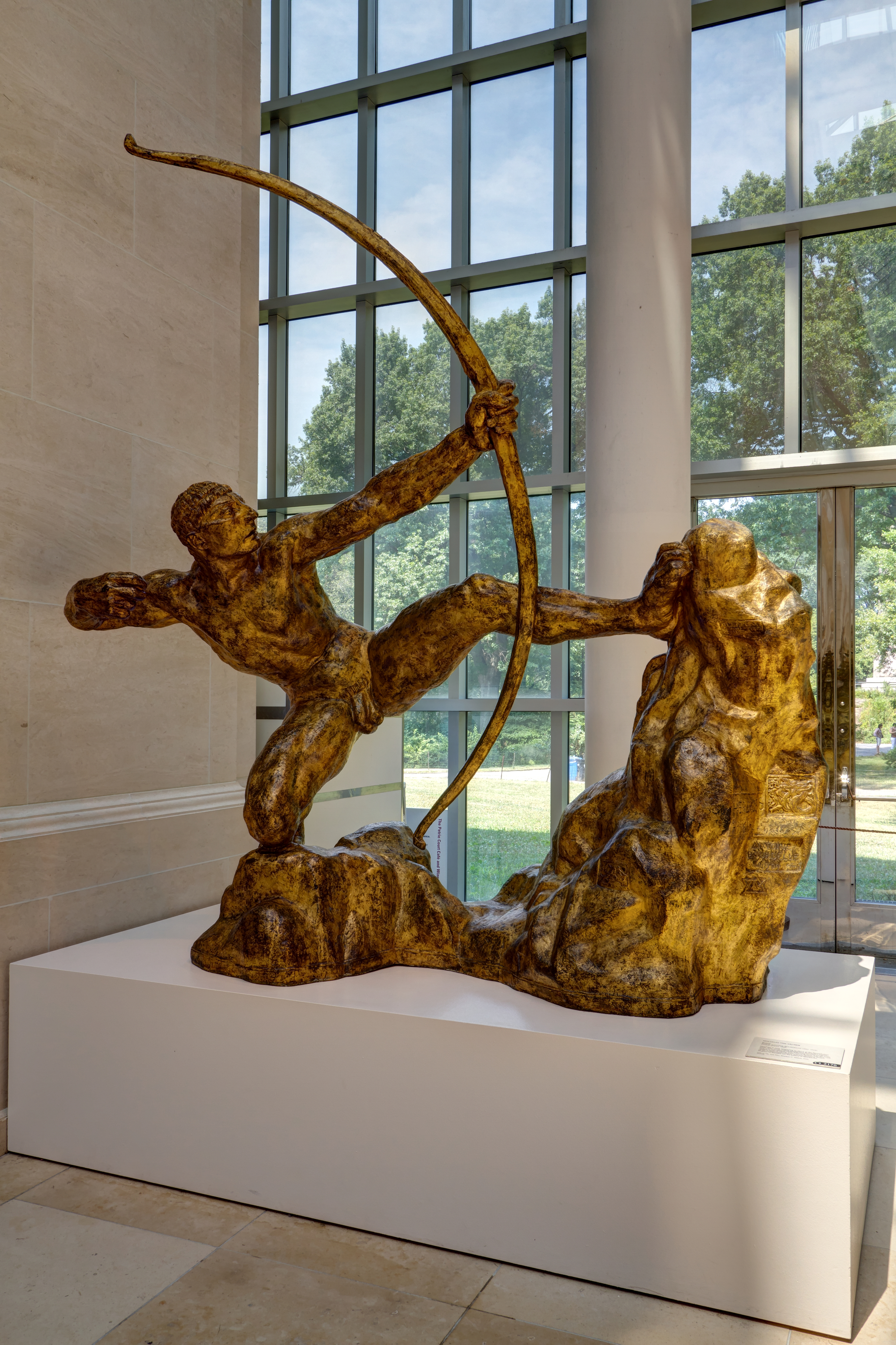
Hercules the Archer (1909), Metropolitan Museum of Art

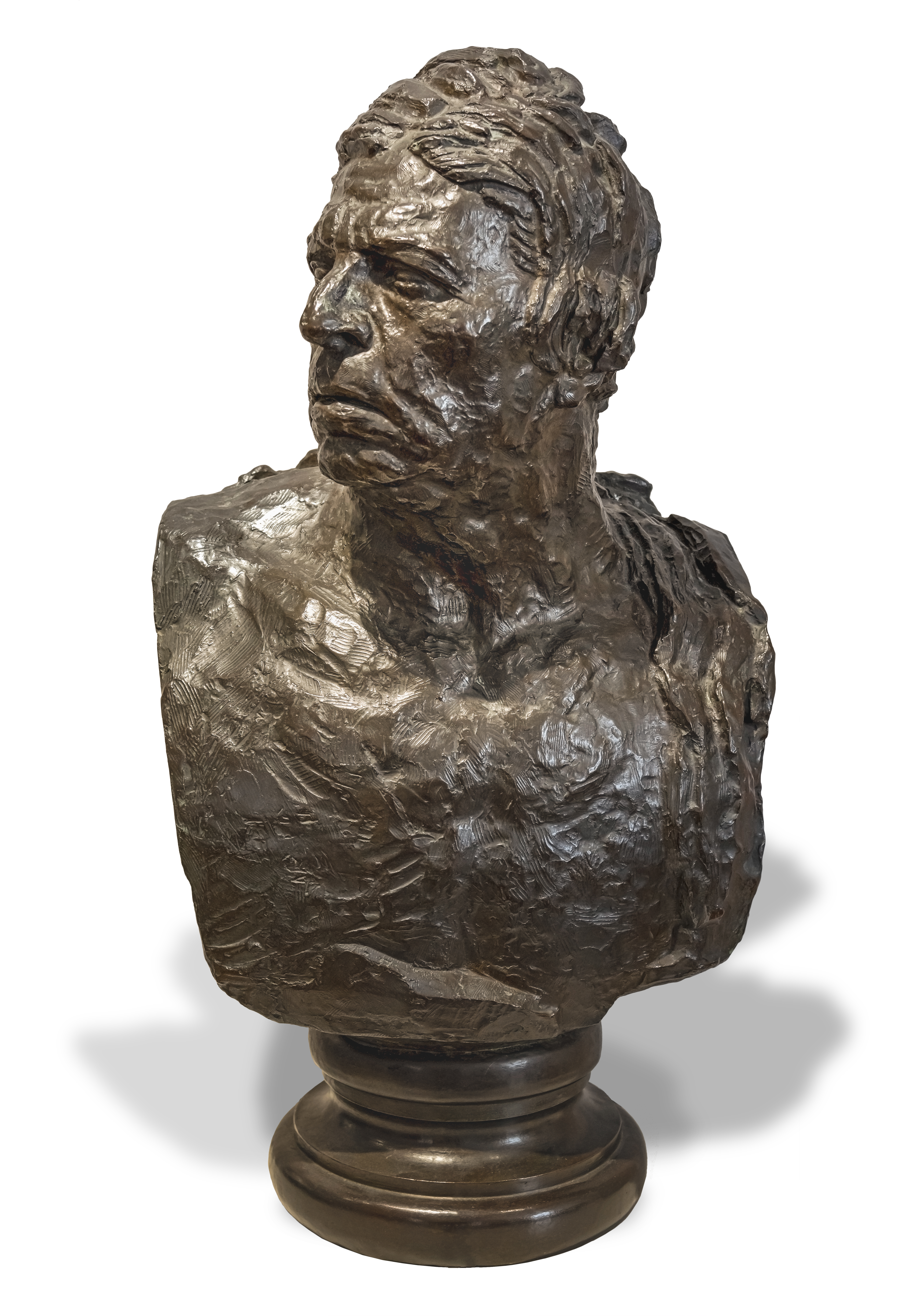
Bust of Ingres, Musée Ingres-Bourdelle, Montauban (1908)

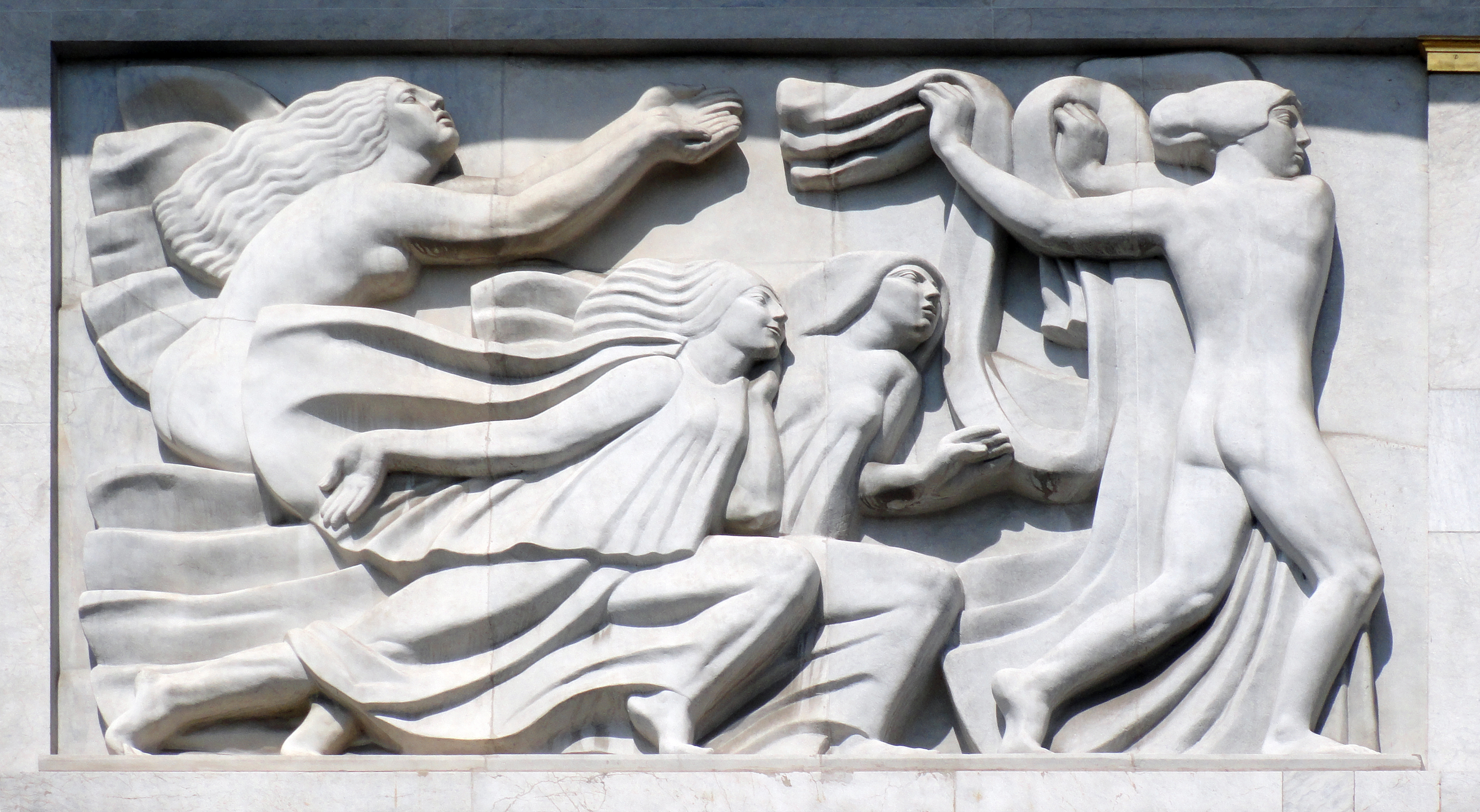
Apollo with three of the nine muses, Théâtre des Champs-Élysées (1910–12)

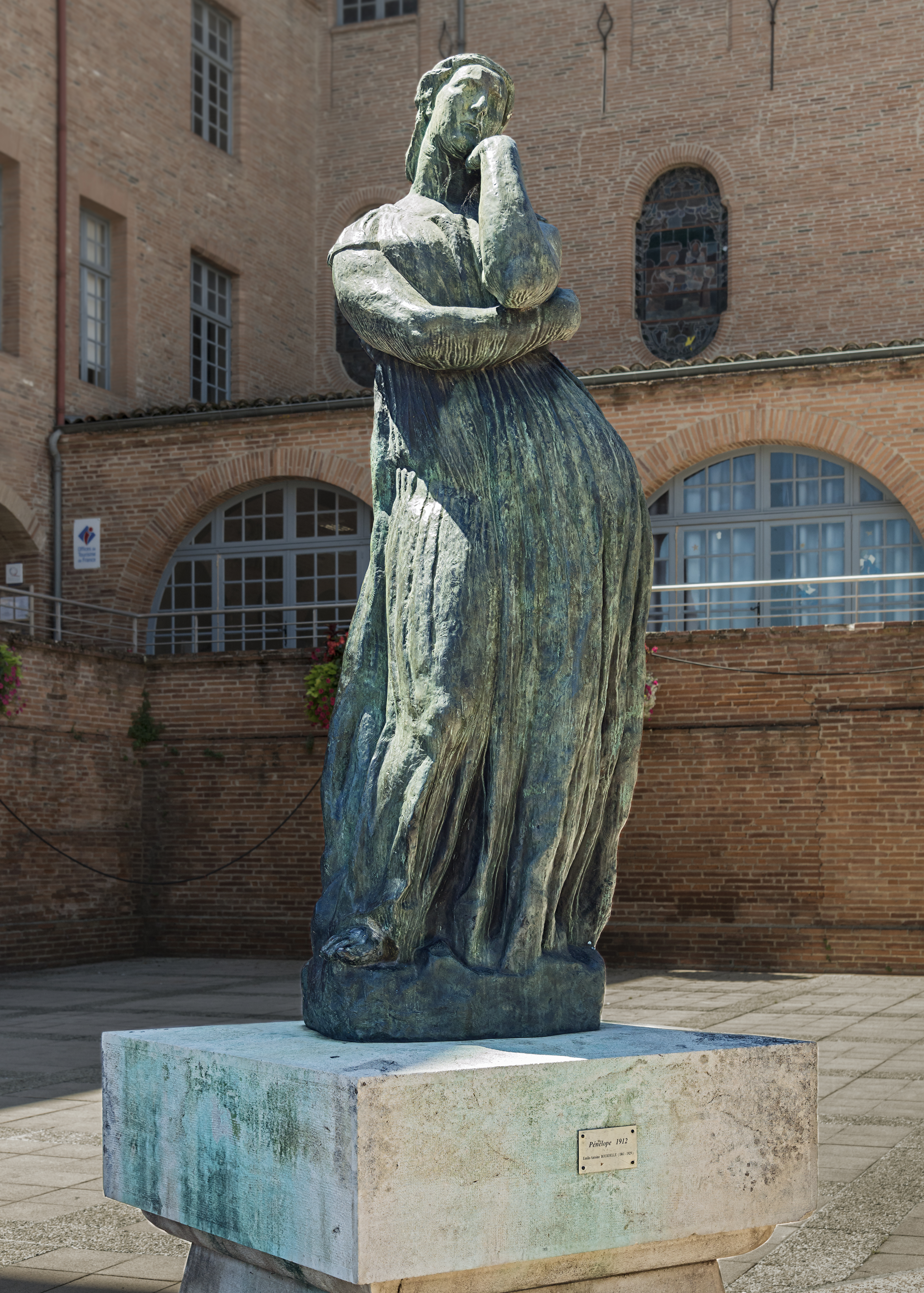
La Grande Penelope, bronze, 1912, Montauban

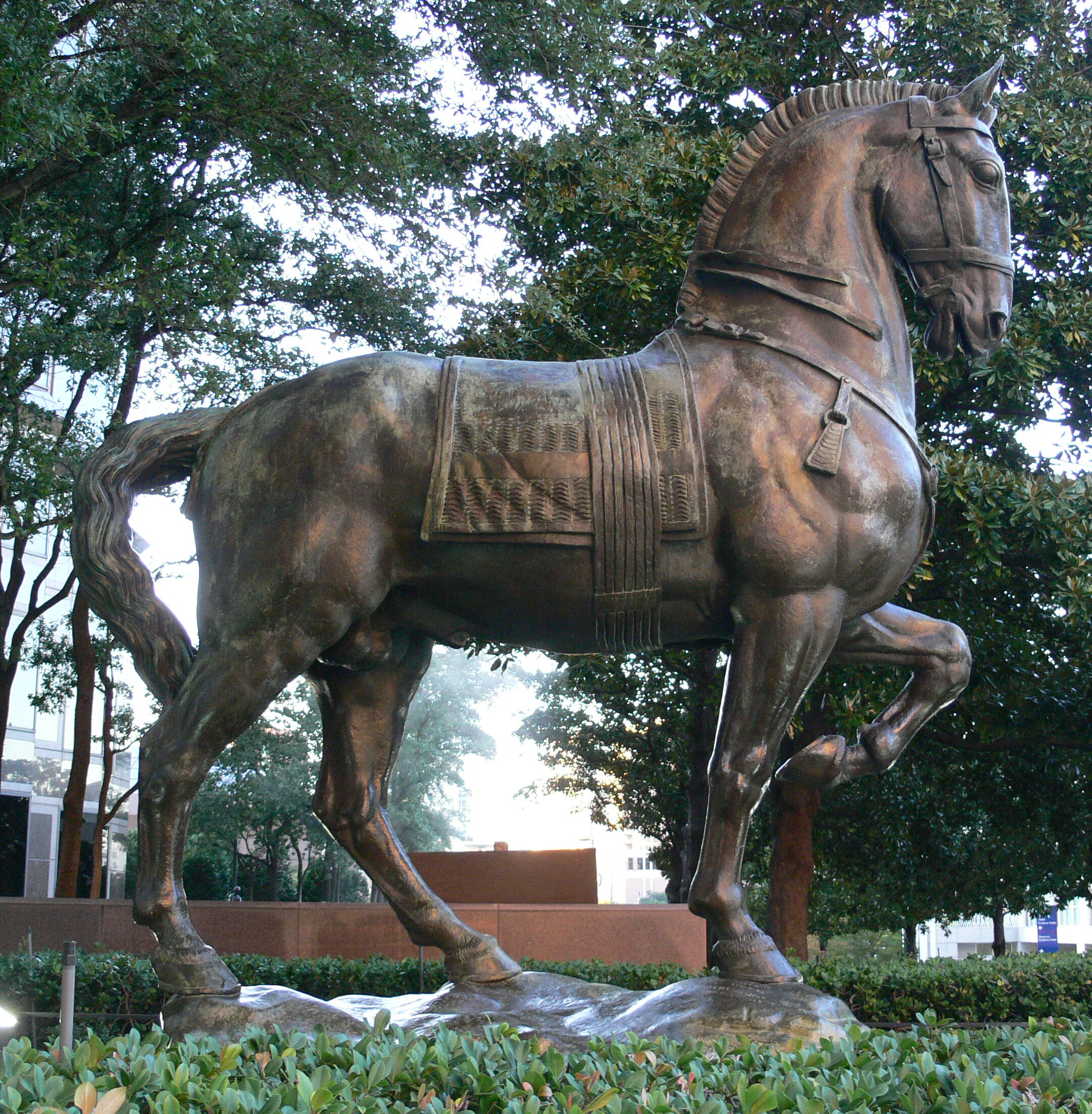
Monument to Alvear Horse, Trammell Crow Sculpture Garden, Dallas, Texas (1913–25)

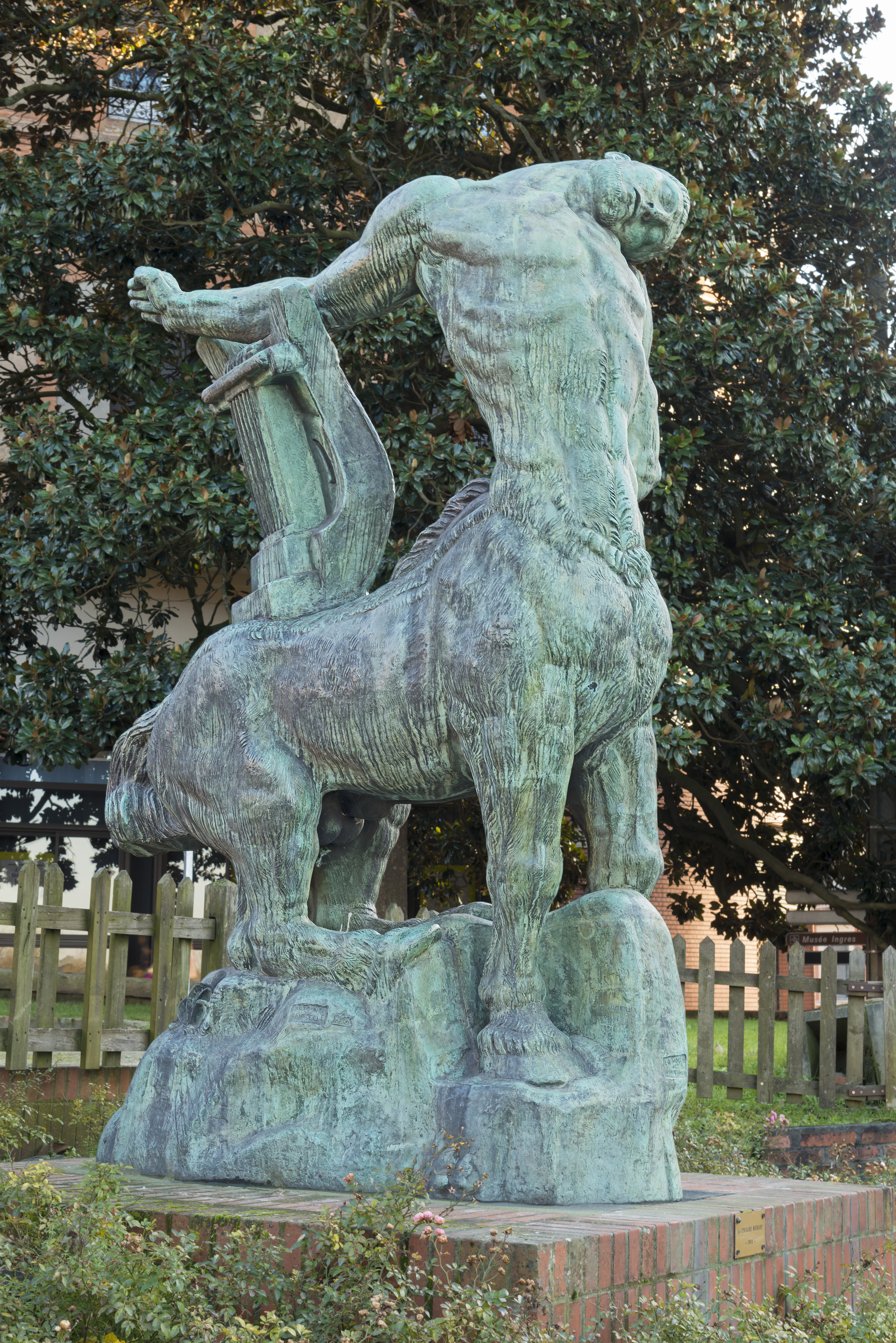
Dying Centaur, 1914, bronze, Musée Ingres-Bourdelle, Montauban

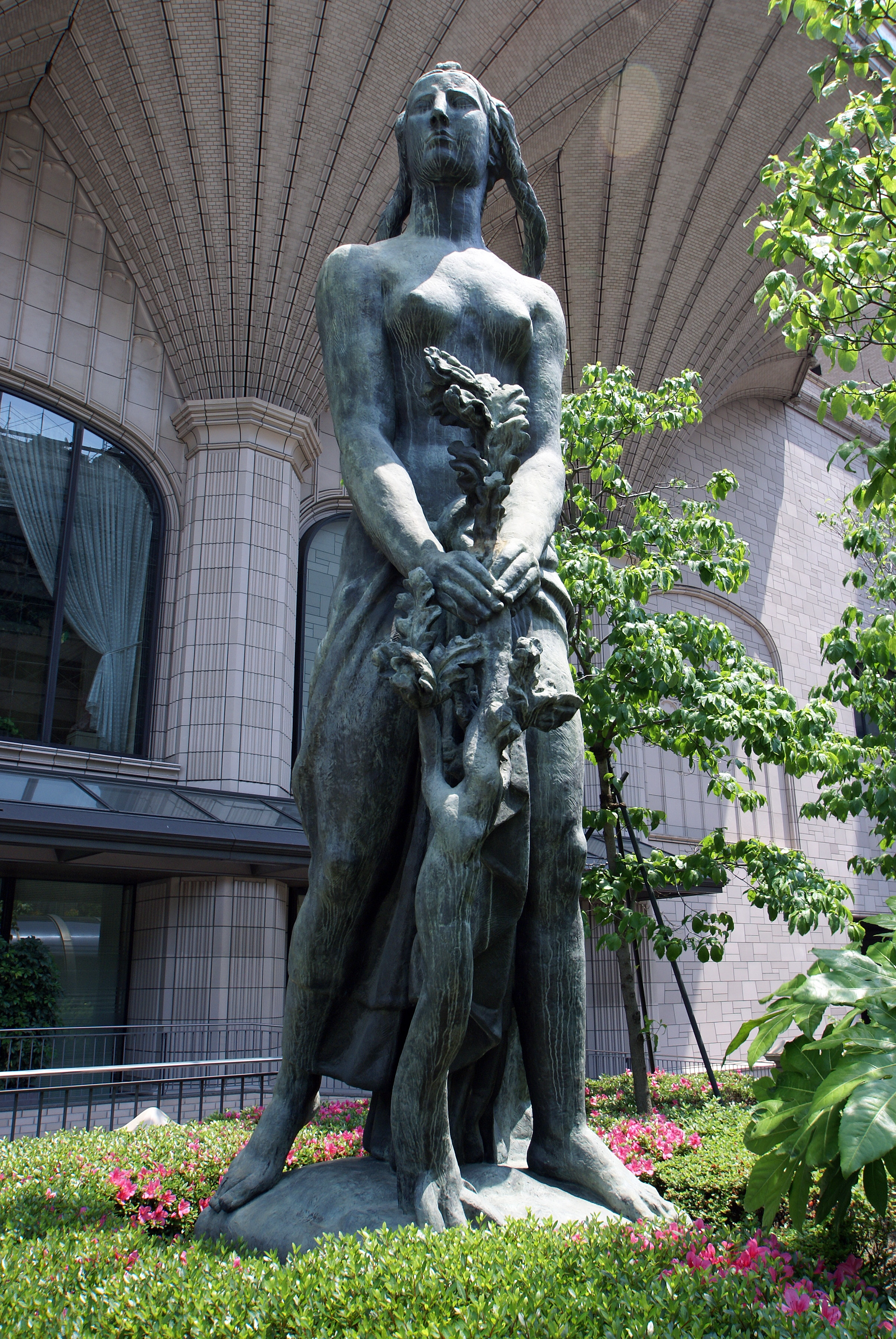
La Liberté, Daido Life Insurance Company, Osaka, Japan

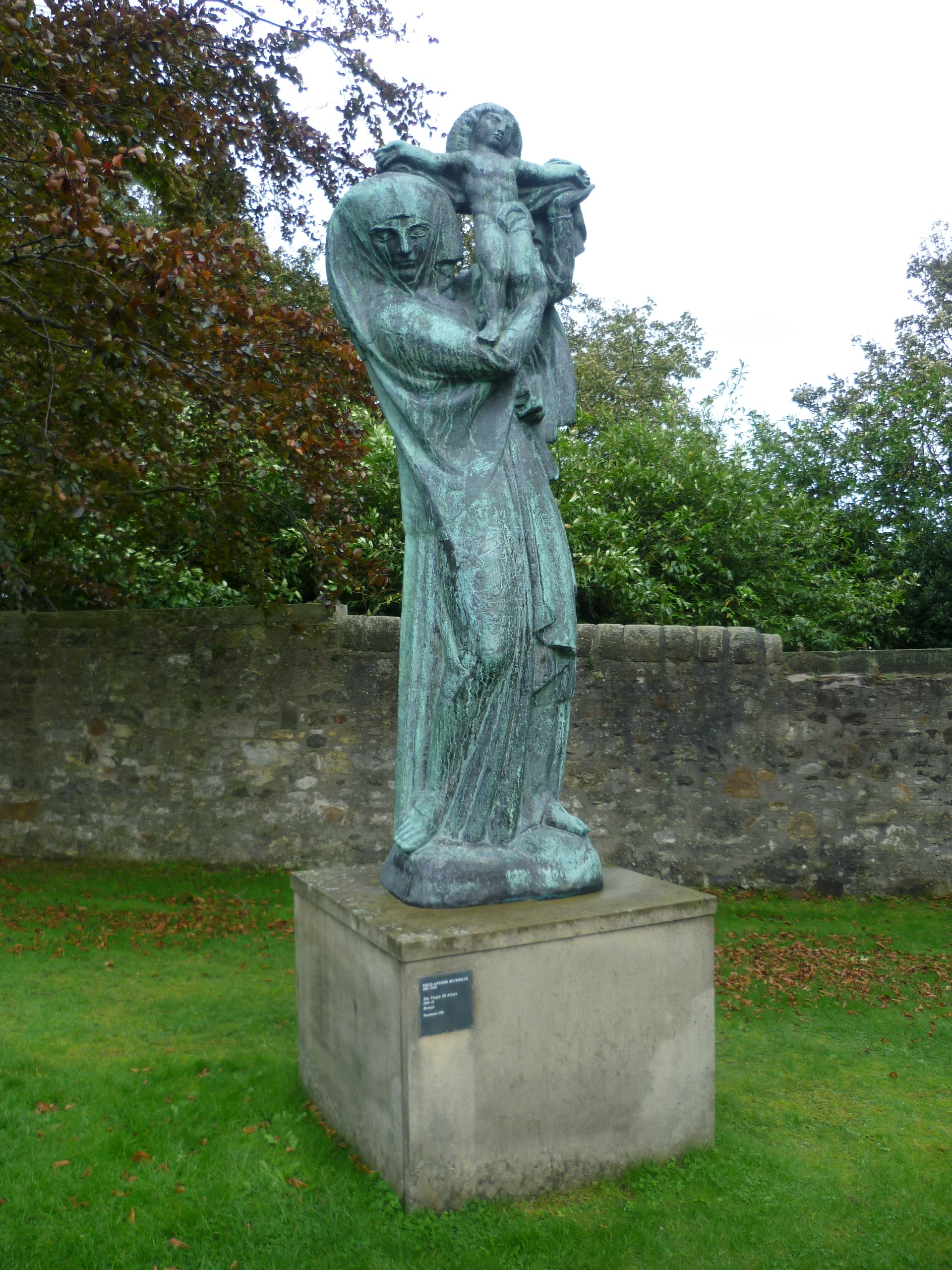
The Virgin of Alsace, 1919–21, Edinburgh, Scotland

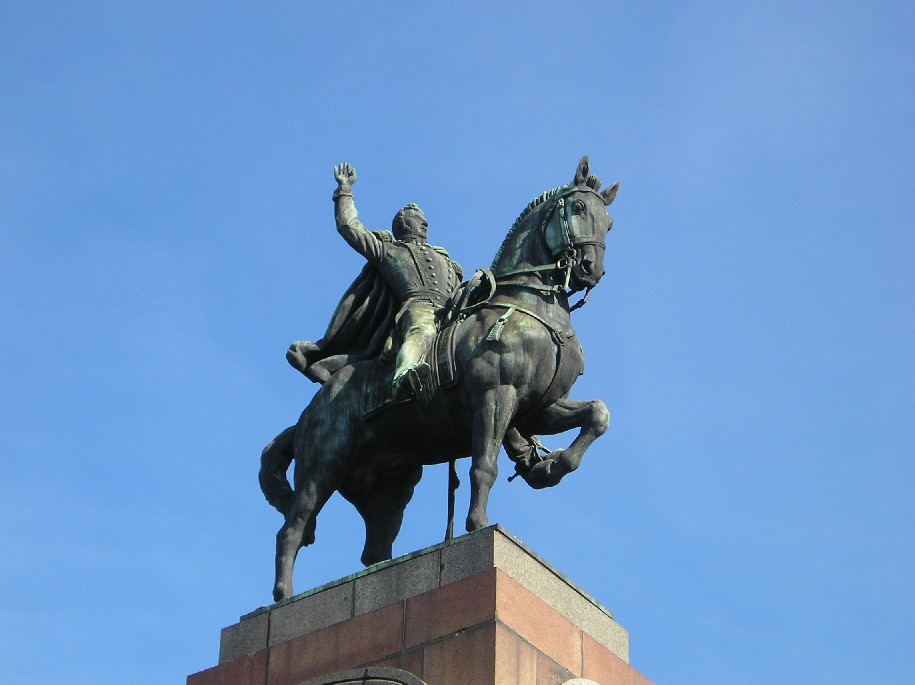
Monument to General Carlos M. de Alvear, Recoleta, Buenos Aires

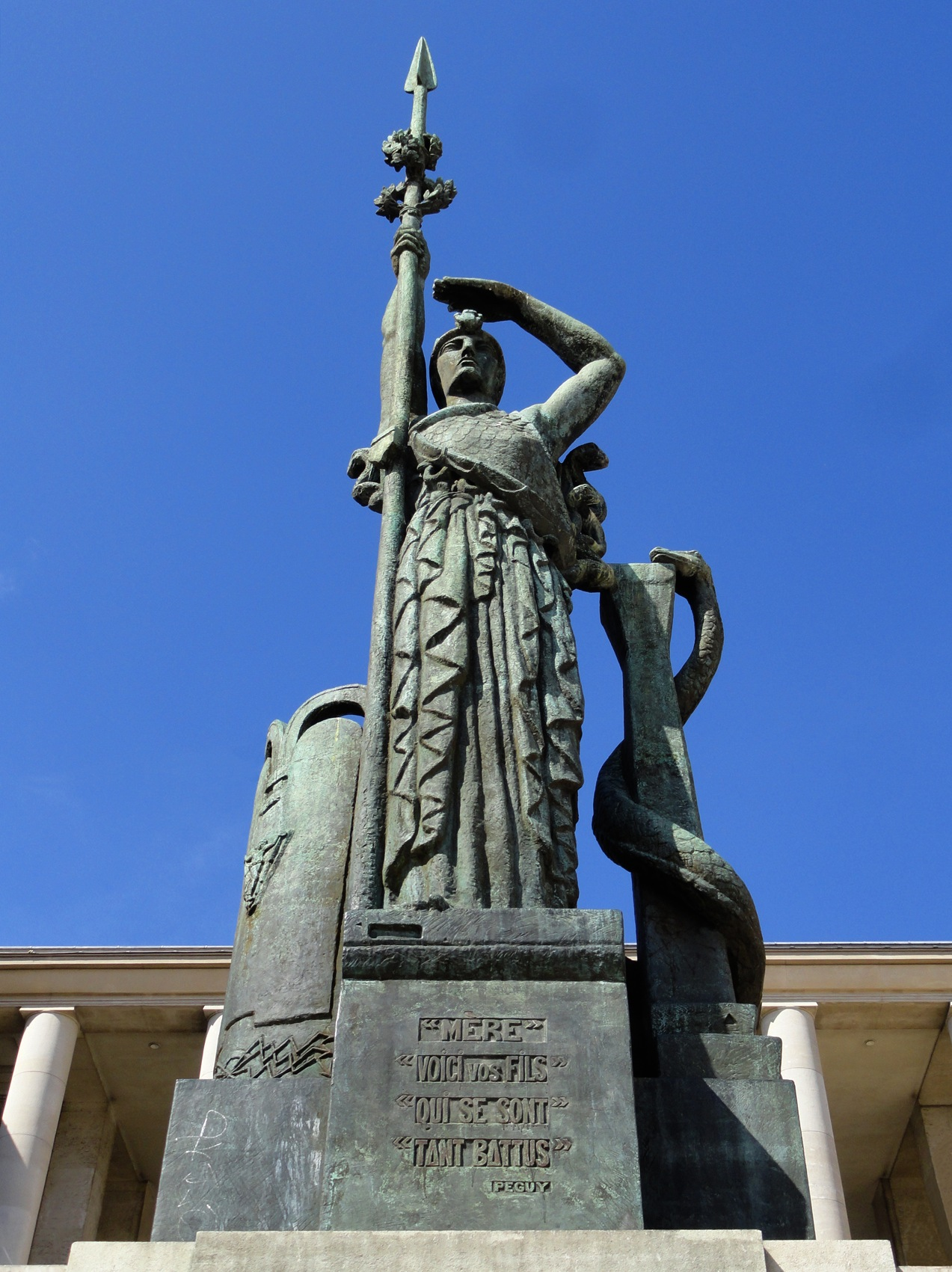
Monument titled La France) (1922), erected 18 June 1948, Musée d'Art Moderne de la Ville de Paris, Palais de Tokyo

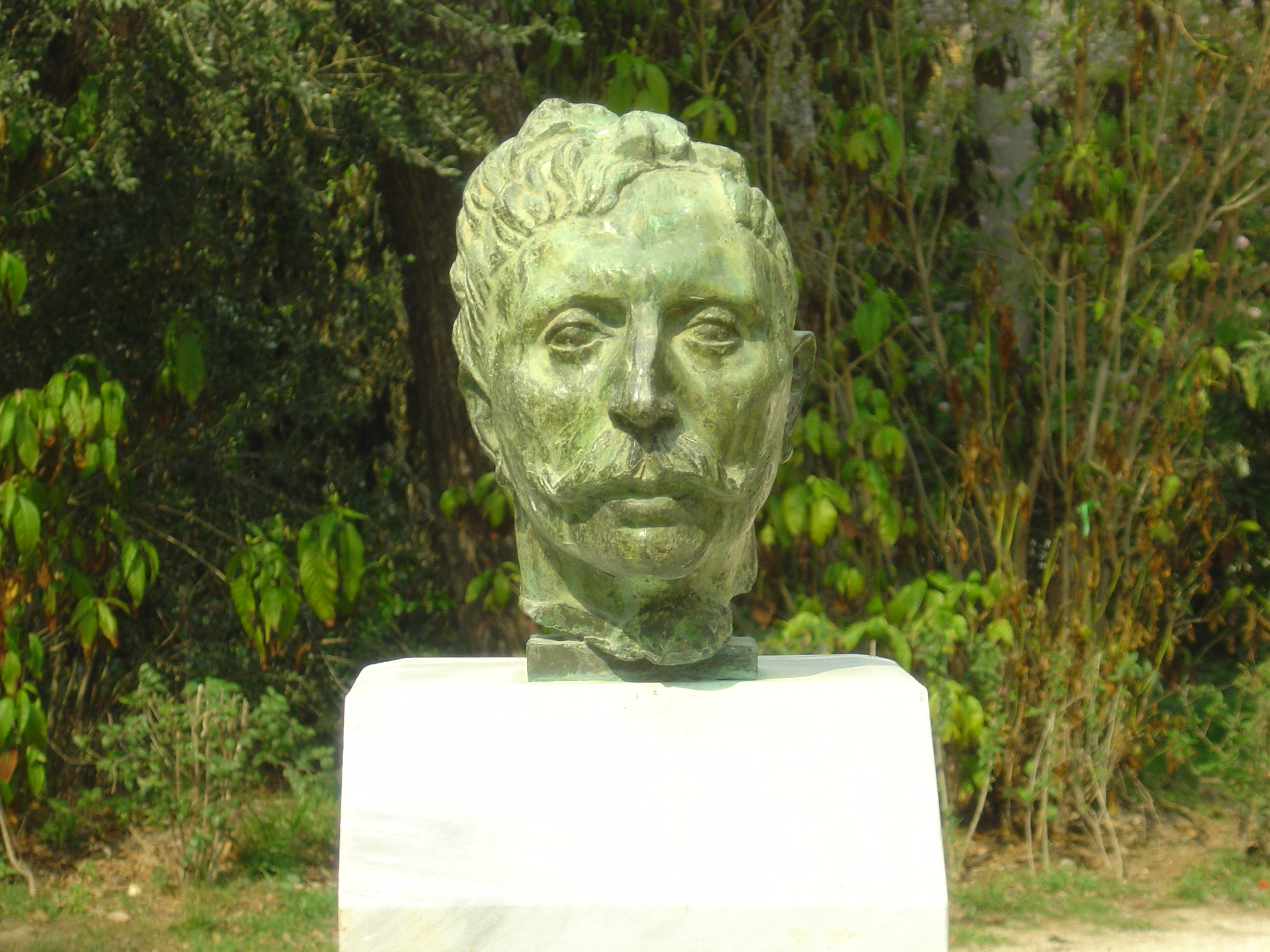
Bust of Jean Moreas, bronze, National Sculpture Garden, Athens, Greece

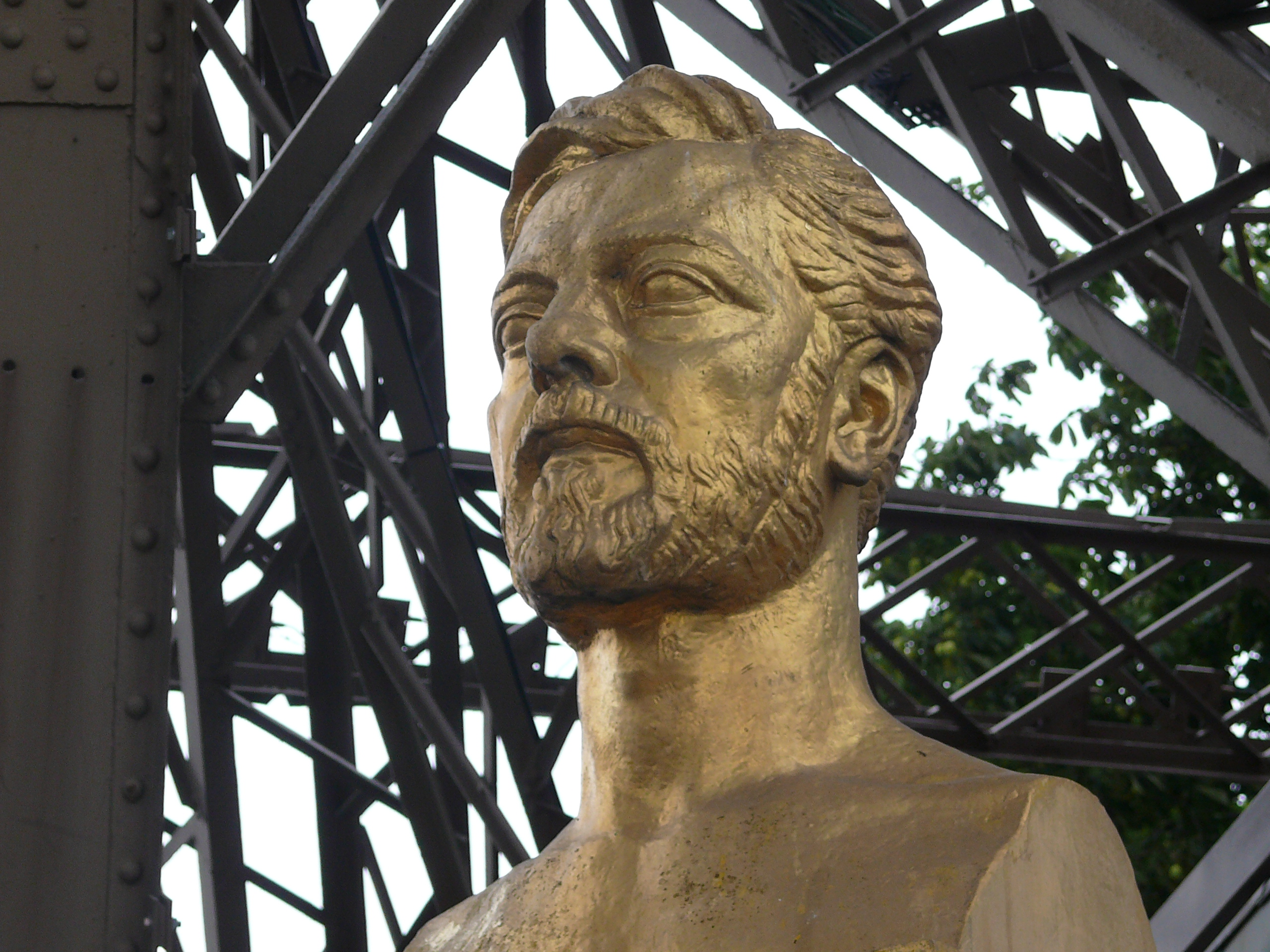
Bust of Gustave Eiffel at the Eiffel Tower France

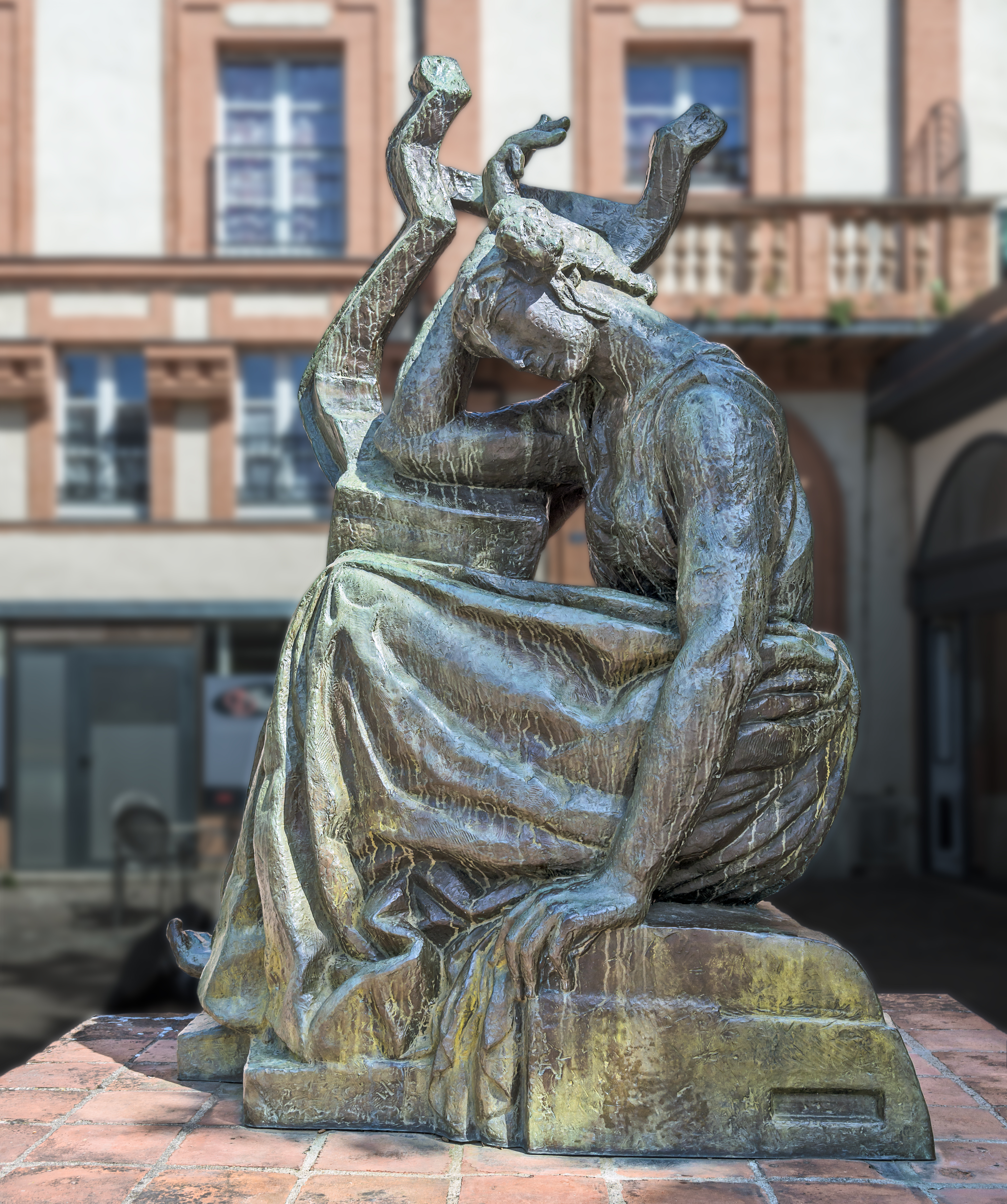
Sappho, 1925 Montauban France

== Students ==
Artists who studied with Antoine Bourdelle included:

- Athanase Apartis, Greece
- Alfredo Bigatti, Argentina
- Jean de Botton, France
- Lucie Bouniol, France
- Margaret Butler (sculptor), New Zealand
- Samuel Cashwan, United States
- Pablo Curatella Manes, Argentina
- Margaret Cossaceanu, Romania
- Céline Emilian, Romania
- Béni Ferenczy, Hungary
- Yitzhak Frenkel, Israel, France
- Helen Margaret George, England
- Alberto Giacometti, Switzerland
- Angela Gregory, United States
- Otto Gutfreund, Czechoslovakia
- Minna Harkavy, United States
- Bror Hjorth, Sweden
- René Iché, France
- Mladen Josić, Serbia
- Raoul Josset, France/United States
- David Karfunkle, Austria/United States
- Adaline Kent, United States
- Emile Lahner, Hungary
- Aristide Maillol, France
- Henri Matisse, France
- Vadym Meller, Ukraine
- Marguerite Milward, England
- Vera Mukhina, Russian Empire/USSR
- Bencho Obreshkov, Bulgaria
- Dudley Pratt, United States
- Virginia Claflin Pratt, United States
- Germaine Richier, France
- Arnold Rönnebeck, Germany/United States
- Ada Mae Sharpless, United States
- Maria Helena Vieira da Silva, Portugal
- Risto Stijović, Serbia
- Sreten Stojanović, Serbia
- Mihailo Tomić, Serbia
- Josefina de Vasconcellos, England
- Anna Marie Valentien, United States
- Helen Wilson, United States
- Louise Lentz Woodruff, United States
- Ryumon Yasuda, Japan
- Teodors Zalkalns, Latvia
- José Luis Zorrilla de San Martín, Uruguay

For a first hand account of Bourdelle's teaching style see Arnold Ronnebeck's article from 1925, published in The Arts 8, no. 4 titled "Bourdelle Speaks to His Pupils: From a Paris Diary."

== See also ==
- Art Deco in Paris

== Bibliography ==
- Colin Lemoine, Antoine Bourdelle. L'oeuvre à demeure, Paris, Paris-Musées, 2009
- Bourdelle, Émile-Antoine, "Émile-Antoine Bourdelle, Sculptures and Drawings", Perth, Western Australian Art Gallery, 1978.
- Jeancolas, Claude, Sculpture Française, CELIV, Paris (1992), (ISBN 978-2-86535-162-6)
- Ottawa.National Gallery of Canada, "Antoine Bourdelle, 1861-1929", New York, C. E. Slatkin Galleries, 1961.
- Colin Lemoine, Antoine Bourdelle, Paris, Cercle d'art, 2004,(ISBN 978-2-7022-0749-9)
- Antoine Bourdelle, passeur de la modernité, exhibition catalogue (curators Roxana Theodorescu, Juliette Laffon and Colin Lemoine / Catalogue Colin Lemoine), Bucarest, National Museum of Art, 2006
- Colin Lemoine, Le Fruit : une œuvre majuscule d'Antoine Bourdelle, Ligeia, January–June 2005, n°57-58-59-60, p. 60-78
- Colin Lemoine, "...sans ce modelé à la Rodin, à la XVIIIe siècle qui beurre le tout : Bourdelle et la question d'un primitivisme occidental", Bulletin du musée Ingres, May 2006, n° 78, p. 49-66
- Cléopâtre Sevastos, Ma vie avec Bourdelle, Paris-Musées-Editions des Cendres, 2005 (annoted edition by Colin Lemoine)
- Véronique Gautherin, L'Oeil et la main (2000)
- Antoine Bourdelle, d'un siècle l'autre. L'eurythmie de la modernité, exhibition catalogue by Colin Lemoine, Japan (Kitakyushu, Niigata, Takamatsu, Iwaki, Nagoya, Seoul), 2007–2008.
