= Delphine Levy =

French manager of cultural institutions (1969–2020)

- Born: 1969
- Died: 13 July 2020 (aged 51)
- Occupation: manager of cultural institutions

Delphine Levy (1969 – 13 July 2020) was a French manager of cultural institutions. She was director of Paris Musées between 2013 and 2020. She was a graduate of the École nationale d’Administration (ENA) and focused on improving the unique cultural qualities of museums and other cultural buildings across the country, focusing on promoting exhibitions that the locations would normally consider too risky to acquire funding for.

In 2010, she submitted proposals in two reports concerning the museums of the City of Paris. She recommended grouping the municipal cultural institutions into a single agency, a public administrative establishment with a dedicated budget and responsibility for managing the approximately one thousand employees involved, following organizational models used in cities such as London, Berlin, and Florence. These cultural institutions included fourteen museums: the Musée Carnavalet, Petit Palais, Musée Cernuschi, Musée Cognacq-Jay, Maison de Victor Hugo, Maison de Balzac, Musée de la Vie romantique, Musée Zadkine, Musée Bourdelle, Musée d'Art Moderne de Paris, Musée de la Libération de Paris, Musée Galliera, the Crypte archéologique de l'île de la Cité, and the Catacombs of Paris. The objective was to improve oversight of renovation projects regularly required by these institutions and to provide them with a coherent and coordinated policy aimed at attracting new audiences. These institutions competed in the French capital with the national museums operated by the French state.

The reform also included management of the Fonds municipal d'art contemporain de la Ville de Paris, whose collection had been gradually assembled since 1816, as well as approximately 20000 works of art displayed in municipal buildings, parks, public squares, and around one hundred religious buildings that became property of the City of Paris following the 1905 French law on the Separation of the Churches and the State. Her recommendations were approved, and in 2013 the new municipal public institution Paris Musées was officially created, taking over the pre-existing structure and name. She was subsequently appointed to lead the institution.

Levy died on 13 July 2020, aged 51.
