= Israel-Palestine =

Geographic designation

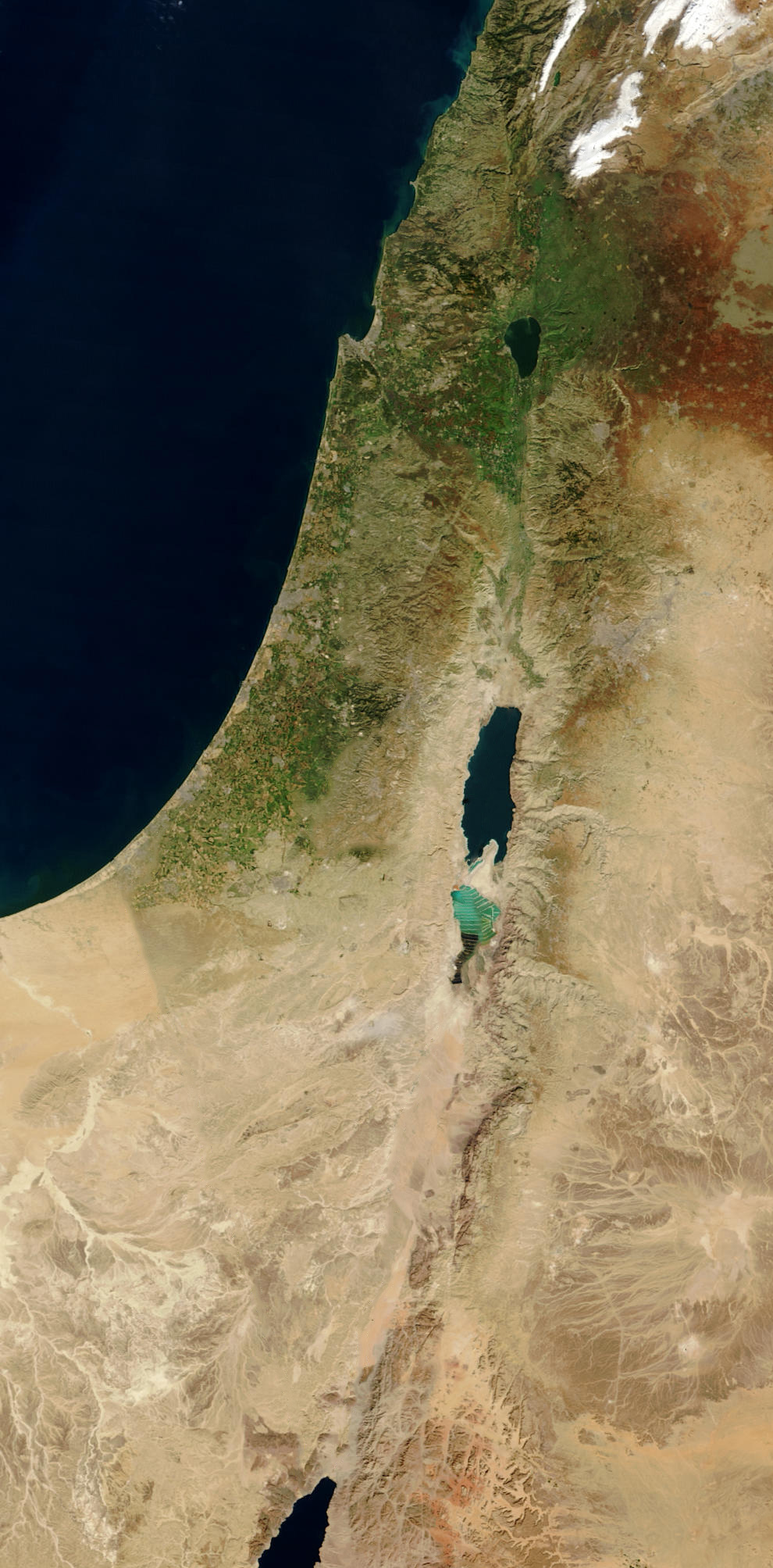
Israel-Palestine as seen from space

Israel-Palestine or Israel/Palestine is a sometimes-used designation that categorizes Green Line Israel, the Gaza Strip, and the West Bank as a singular territorial and political unit. Geographically equivalent terms include "Palestine", "Land of Israel", and "Holy Land". A relatively new term, its usage stresses the contested and militarized nature of the land, the overlapping definitions of Palestinian and Zionist homelands, and Israeli control over the territories it has occupied since the 1967 Six-Day War.

Nur Masalha criticizes the name "Israel-Palestine" as a product of the "peace process industry" and liberal Zionism, with the hyphenation presenting Israel as the core/primary political entity and Palestine as a secondary/subordinate appendage. Many Israelis have also criticized the term, viewing its usage as a step towards a binational one-state solution for the region. Palestine-Israel has been employed as an alternative name that recognizes the asymmetry of the Israeli–Palestinian conflict and seeks to assert Palestine as of equal validity to Israel. On the other hand, Walid Daqqah has characterized "Israel-Palestine" as instead promoting a false equality, arguing that the hyphenation gives the appearance of moral symmetry and strategically avoids the framing of Israel as a colonialist entity.

Some academics have commented on perceived discursive symbolism in both "Israel-Palestine" and "Israel/Palestine". According to Hella Bloom Cohen, "Israel-Palestine" differs conceptually from "Israel/Palestine" in that the former designation emphasizes a shared aspect while the latter expresses an "and/or" notion. In the view of Mikki Stelder, while "Israel/Palestine" refers to a "particular geopolitical formation", the slash also symbolizes Israel's domination over the Palestinians. Similarly, Louise Katz considers "Israel/Palestine" to insinuate an "either/or" relationship– that one state exists at the expense of the other– while simultaneously indicating interchangeability. She notes that even the word "slash" itself can carry connotations of brutality and can symbolize an uncomfortable and violent relationship.

A 2024 international report on pincer wasps in the Middle East used the term "Israel-Palestine" and noted that the researchers classified it as a single country in order to avoid confusion, since several taxonomic groups of the wasps had been recorded before the establishment of Israel in areas that are now variously within Green Line Israel and the Palestinian territories.

== See also ==
- Israeli-occupied territories
- Mandatory Palestine
- Two-state solution
- New Historians
- Palestinian Authority
