= Architect of the City of Paris =

The Architect of the City of Paris (Architecte de la ville de Paris) is the incumbent of a municipal position, responsible for the design and construction of civic projects in Paris.

In the Ancien Régime in France, the position of Bâtiments du Roi oversaw the construction and maintenance of the King's properties in and around Paris. This position lasted from 1620 through 1789. The Architect's position, accountable to the municipal government, was established after the French Revolution.

Most if not all of Paris's official architects were drawn from the graduates of the École nationale supérieure des Beaux-Arts. Multiple architects may hold the title at any one time. Through the early 1900s the duties encompassed what would today be considered a mix of architecture, urban planning, civil engineering, historic preservation, and traffic management—for instance, during his tenure in 1907, Eugene Henard developed the first modern roundabout in France at the Place de l'Étoile.

== Architects of the City of Paris ==
- Bernard Poyet, c. 1791
- Étienne-Hippolyte Godde, 1818–1830
- Napoléon Alexandre Roger, 1833–1872
- Émile Gilbert, c. 1845
- Victor Baltard, c. 1849
- Léon Ginain, c. 1860
- Alfred-Philibert Aldrophe, c. 1874
- Marcellin-Emmanuel Varcollier, c. 1883
- Louis Bonnier, c. 1884
- Eugène Hénard, c. 1906–07
- Léon Azéma, c. 1928
- Joseph Auguste Émile Vaudremer
- Henri Gautruche
