= Al-Midan Theater =

Arabic-speaking theater in Haifa, Israel

Coordinates: 32°48′55.6″N 34°59′50.8″E

Al Midan Theater
- مسرح الميدان
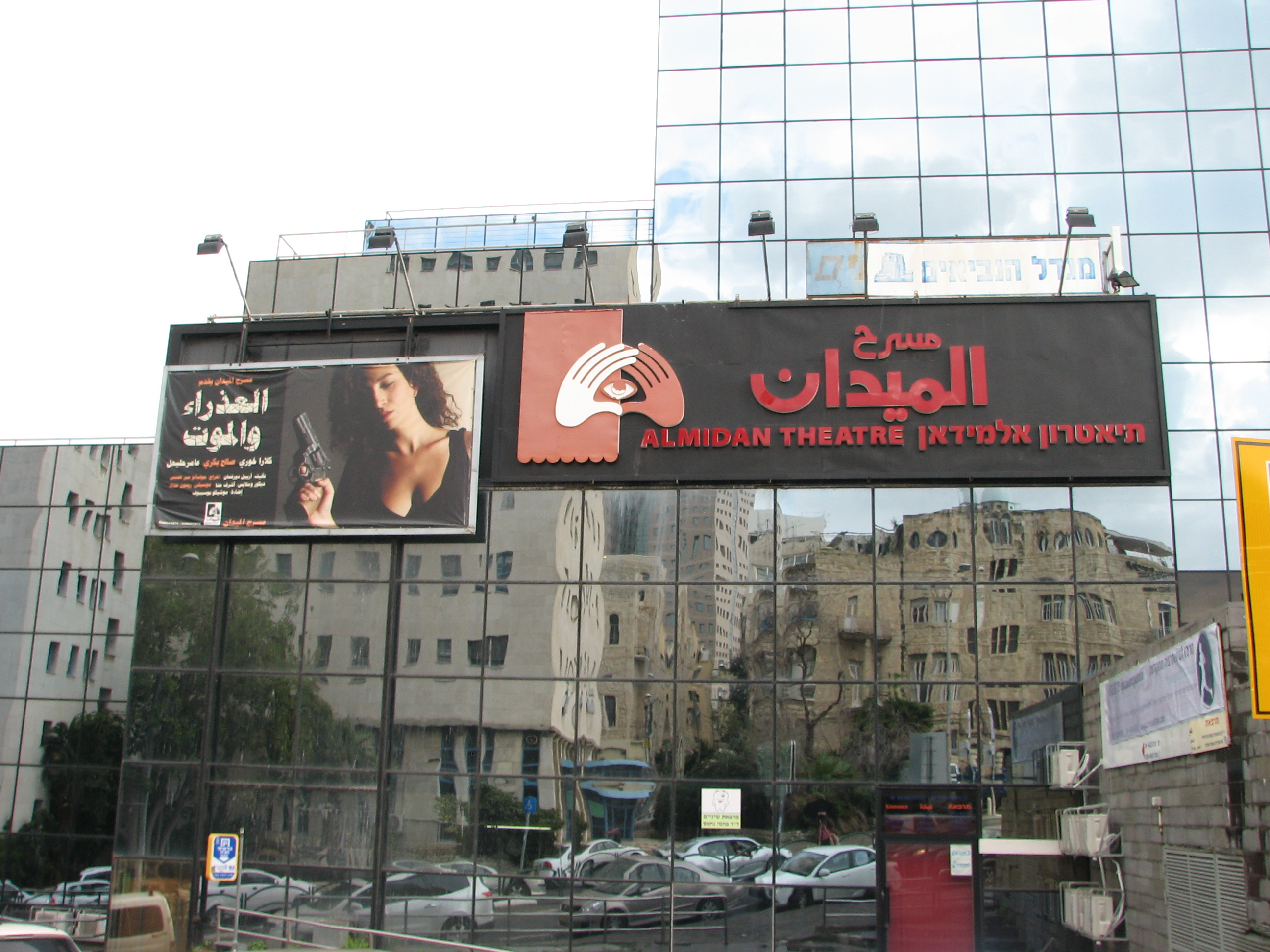
- Al-Midan Theater sign at Migdal HaNeviim
- Interactive map of Al Midan Theater
- Address: Migdal HaNeviim; Haifa; Israel
- Capacity: Main hall: 292 seats; Second hall: 112 seats (named after Mazen Ghattas)
- Type: Arabic-speaking theater

Construction
- Opened: 1994; 32 years ago

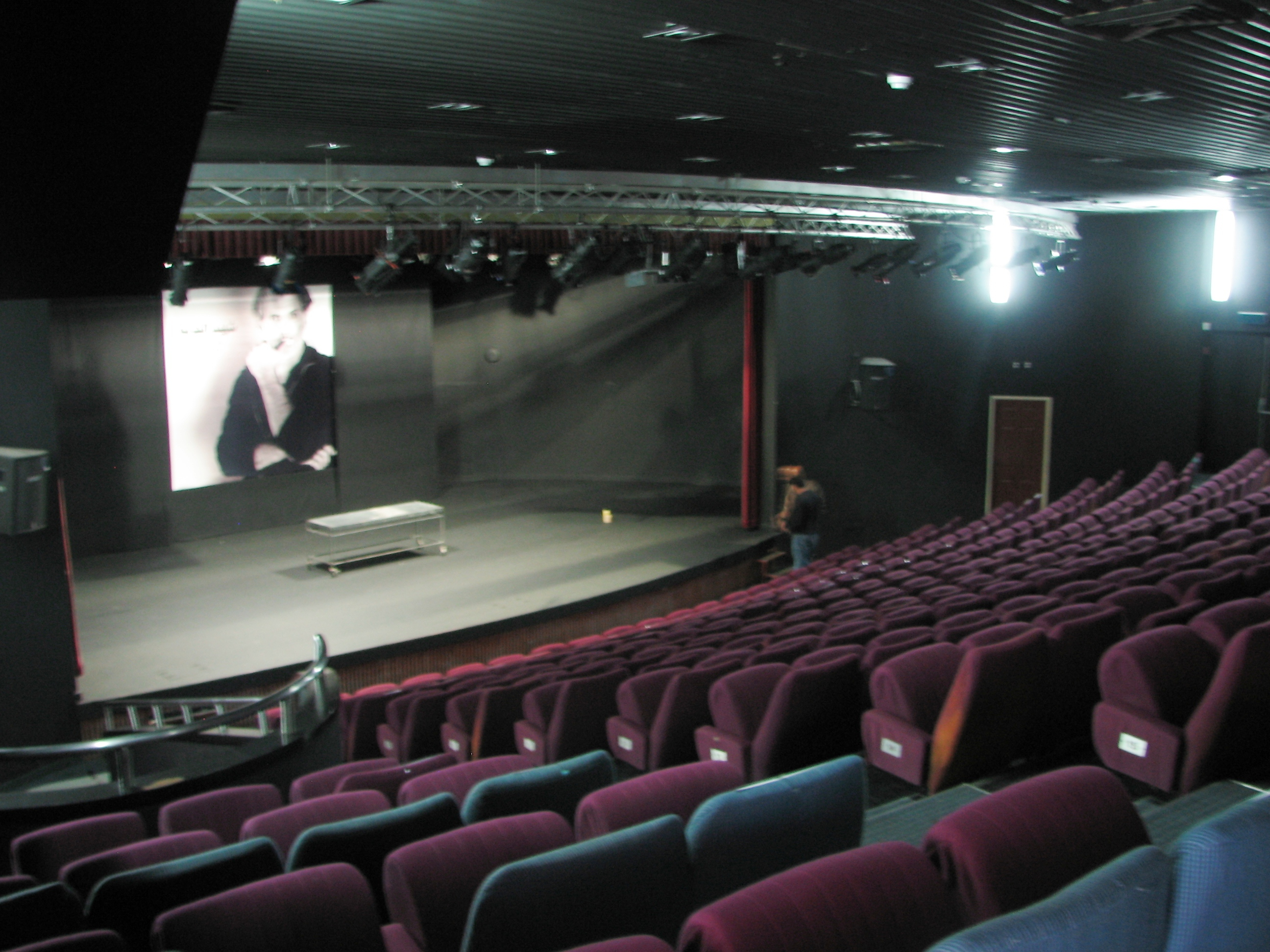
The theater's hall #1

Al Midan Theater (Arabic: مسرح الميدان) is the Arabic-speaking theater in Haifa, Israel.

== History ==
The theater was founded in 1994 by group of Arab Israeli Palestinian Theatre Artists like Yousef Abu Wardeh, Fouad Awad and others, and received the full support of the Israeli Minister of Education Shulamit Aloni during Israeli Prime Minister Yitzhak Rabin's government and with the assistant of then Haifa mayor Amram Mitzna, through the Council for Culture and Art in Haifa, by chairman Isaac Rubin and Ouriel Zohar who then chaired the Council's theater committee. At the beginning it was named "The Arab-Israeli theater", but after a few years it was renamed to its current name. The theater serves as the artistic community of Arabs in Israel. Productions of the theater run throughout the country. The theater consists two halls, one hall with 292 seats, and the second with 112 seats. The second hall is named after theater director Mazen Ghattas who died in 2005.

In its early years the theater wandered between Nazareth and Haifa and eventually received a professional hall, 300 seats, at Migdal HaNeviim in Haifa.

The theater runs plays only in the Arabic language, and employs fresh new Arab actors graduating from Israeli drama schools, along with well known first-class actors of Israel's Arab artists.

The initial budget with the opening of the theater was four million Shekel, funded from the budget of the Israeli Ministry of Culture and the Municipality of Haifa. Over the years, the share of budget from the Ministry of Culture had decreased, and the share of the municipality has increased. In March 2011, the theater announced it was in danger of closure, following a cumulative deficit due to the non-transfer of budget promised by former Culture Ministry Director Yoav Rosen.

== "A Parallel Time" controversy ==
During 2014, the theater started running the play "A Parallel Time" based on the life of an Arab citizen of Israel, Walid Daqqa. Daqqa was a prisoner serving a life sentence, who was convicted of being part of the group that abducted and killed Israeli soldier Moshe Tamam. Following a protest by bereaved families, local public figures and others, Haifa Municipality decided to freeze the funding for the theater and to establish a committee to examine further steps. Since the show started running, about 900 students in Junior year and Twelfth grade had watched the show. Education Minister Naftali Bennett convened the National Cultural Cart Committee to examine the cancellation of further show orders. On June 8, 2015 the Culture Committee unanimously decided not to remove the show from the National Cultural Cart funding, however, the minister used his authority to order its removal and the show had been removed from the Culture Cart.
