= Ouriel Zohar =

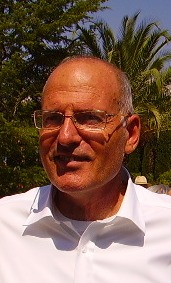
Ouriel Zohar in 2009

Ouriel Zohar (born 1952), is an Israeli and French theater director, playwright, poet and translator from French to Hebrew. Professor at the Department of Humanities & Arts at the Technion University, created the Technion theater in 1986. Has been full professor at the University of Paris VIII since 1997 and at HEC Paris since 1995.

== Biography ==
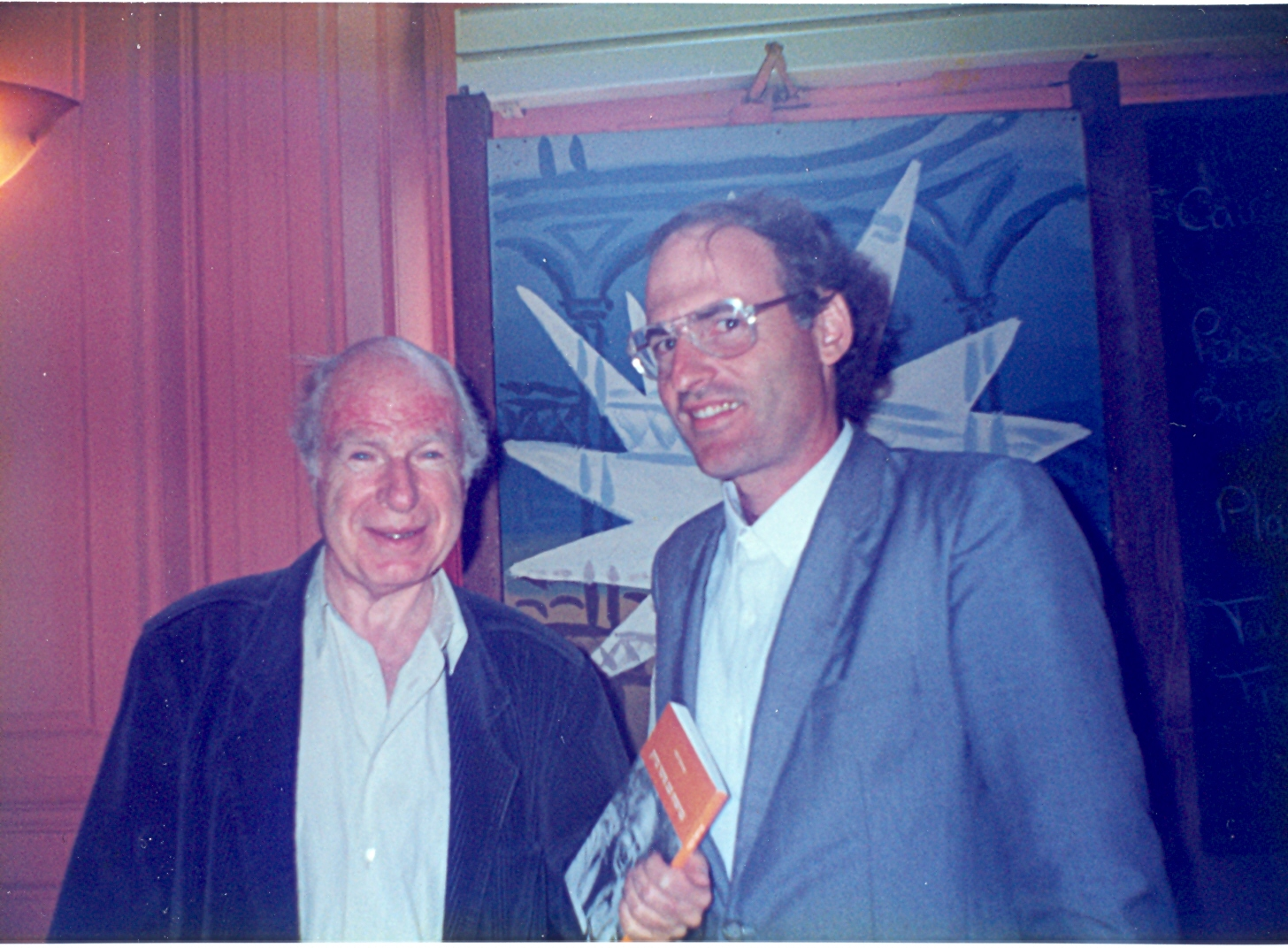
Ouriel Zohar gives his book in Hebrew "Meetings with Peter Brook," to Peter Brook, Paris 1991

Zohar started directing in Paris in 1978. He completed a doctorate on the theme of the collective and Universal (metaphysics) Kibbutz Theatre, presented it at the University of Paris VIII, where he was assistant professor from 1980 to 1985. He has published 150 articles in the field of theater and academic journals in English, French, Slovene language, German language and Hebrew. His university writings are also about Peter Brook, Constantin Stanislavski, Jerzy Grotowski, Augusto Boal, Martin Buber, Aaron David Gordon and Mikhaël Aïvanhov who profoundly influenced theater.

Until 2017 he has directed 75 plays in Israel, Europe, Canada, Africa and Asia. He has written and directed on stage his 46 original plays in Hebrew, and also plays by Hanoch Levin, Joshua Sobol, S. Ansky etc. He has directed modern plays written by Peter Brook, Birago Diop, Farid al-Din Attar, Jean-Claude Carrière, Sławomir Mrożek, Steven Soderbergh, John Hughes (filmmaker) etc. He has directed classic plays by Molière, Shakespeare, Marivaux, Henrik Ibsen and George Bernard Shaw etc.

His Technion theater takes part in festivals in Europe, Canada and Israel. He teaches stage aesthetics, playwriting and actor performance in Paris, Israel, Minsk and India. He was a dramaturg at the Habima Theatre in 1989–1990 and the Haifa Municipal Theatre in 1995–1997. He has conducted Judeo-Arab collaborative projects by means of art and is among the founders of the Al-Midan Theater in Haifa in 1994. Between 1993 and 1999 he was vice-president of the International Association of University Theatre (IUTA), based in the University of Liège, Belgium, and honorary member in 2005; From 1995 he is a visiting professor at HEC, and from 1997 Full Professor at the University of Paris VIII. In 1993, he directed Season of Migration to the North the novel by Sudanese writer Tayeb Salih, with the participation of Mohammad Bakri, a Palestinian-Israeli actor who has received the award for best actor at the Acco Festival of Alternative Israeli Theatre in Acre. With his actor, Bakri, he directed the "Bakri Monologue" in French, Arabic and Hebrew and appeared with Bakri on stage in Paris, at the Boris Vian Hall Theatre of Paris-Villette, on the national stage of Cergy-Pontoise, Lille, at the Peace Festival in Brussels and in other countries. From 2002 he played the leading role of Prospero in The Tempest in the theater of Béatrice Brout, and the Earl of Northumberland in Richard II, by Shakespeare, and interpreted texts of Victor Hugo and other writers in France.

In 2006 he founded his own theatre company, 'Compagnie Ouriel Zohar' in Paris, with An Enemy of the People by Henrik Ibsen, first performed in Paris, then in Frejus and Besançon, in Liege, Belgium, in Minsk, Belarus, in Valleyfield Canada and Porto Heli, Greece. In 2010 he directed "Seraphita", his adaptation of an 1834 novel by Honoré de Balzac, performed in Paris at the "Theatre de l'Ile Saint-Louis", Brussels, Greece, Republic of Congo, in 2012 performed at the Maison de Balzac in Paris, and also in Switzerland, Israel, Istanbul and "Theatre Darius Milhaud" in Paris. In 2012 his theater went to Saint Petersburg with his play "Invisible Garment". In 2014 his theater went to India with his 2 shows: "Message to Materialistes" and "Seraphita".

His directing in Hebrew of Henrik Ibsen's "An Enemy of the People" was accorded the best actor award at the Festival of Benevento, Italy in 2009. From 2007, after being appointed international judge of international competitions in Europe University Theatre, Paris, Minsk, Moscow, etc., he presented master classes for staging and acting in festivals in Europe. In 2014, in India he gave his workshops "Medical Theater" for everybody, specially in Auroville.

Among his most famous students, Scandar Copti, director and screenwriter of Ajami won 5 Ophir Awards 2009, including the best film award in Israel and was nominated for an Oscar of the Academy Award for Best Foreign Language Film in Los Angeles in 2009.

Zohar has published 14 books in Hebrew and 19 in French, 5 in English, one in German and one in French with his deceased wife Martine Bargas-Zohar: "My life in Israel in the light of the stone pine"

In 2013 was elected as parliament member of The Israeli Palestinian Confederation (IPC)

In 2015 he directed his play "L'Initiation du Ciel" in French, in Switzerland, Brussels, Paris, Aix en Provence and Frejus.

In 2017 he directed his play "Das Unsichtbare Kleidungsstück" (The Invisible Garment) to the German community in Frejus.

In 2018, lecturer at the Moscow State University on the subject: "Robotics, Disadvantages and Benefits". In 2019, lecturer at the University of Texas at Austin on the subject: "Eastern Humor as the Basis of Human Wisdom."

In 2019 he directed his play "Our Father Who" in English, to the English community in the city of Fréjus.

In 2022 - 2024 his play "The Boy Who Knows How to Fly" is presented in the Spanish language in Colombia in the cities of Villa de Leyva, Bogotá and Cartagena (Colombia).

== Books ==
- Ouriel Zohar, Mon Voyage Vers L'Un, 2022, paperback Amazon
- Ouriel Zohar, Le Voyage de la Quatrième à la Cinquième Dimension, 2021, paperback Amazon
- Ouriel Zohar, Le Roi ne dort pas, 2021, paperback Amazon
- Ouriel Zohar, OVNIS : RETOUR À LA LUMIÈRE !, 2021, paperback Amazon
- Ouriel Zohar, Atlantis sous l'eau, 2021, paperback Amazon
- Ouriel Zohar, La Lumière des Soucoupes Volantes, 2020, paperback Amazon
- Ouriel Zohar, The New Generation, 2020, paperback Amazon and in French Paperback
- Ouriel Zohar, Aura's Conflict, 2018 (also in French Amazon)
- Ouriel Zohar, Our Father Who..., 2018 (also in French 2018)
- Ouriel Zohar, The boy who knows how to fly Paperback 2018, L'enfant qui savait voler, e-book, (pièce de théâtre), 2016
- Ouriel Zohar, Ariel et le monstre lumineux: Dialogue initiatique, 2017
- Ouriel Zohar, Un Agriculteur, 2017
- Ouriel Zohar and Barbara HEMAN, Seraphita Seraphitus: L'androgyne, theatrical adaptation based on the novel Seraphita by Honoré de Balzac 2017
- Ouriel Zohar, La Clairvoyante (pièce de théâtre), 2016
- Ouriel Zohar, L'Initiation du Ciel (pièce de Théâtre), 2016
- Ouriel Zohar, Le livre tel que je l'ai reçu de mes amis.., 2016
- Ouriel Zohar, The Invisible Garment: How a young man... Editions Amazon.com, 2015, (and also in French 2015) (and also in German 2017)
- Martine Zohar et Ouriel Zohar, Ma vie en Israël à la Lumière des pins parasols, aux éditions Persée, France en 2009, et aux éditions Amazon.fr, 2015.
