= Balaam and the Ass =

Painting by Rembrandt

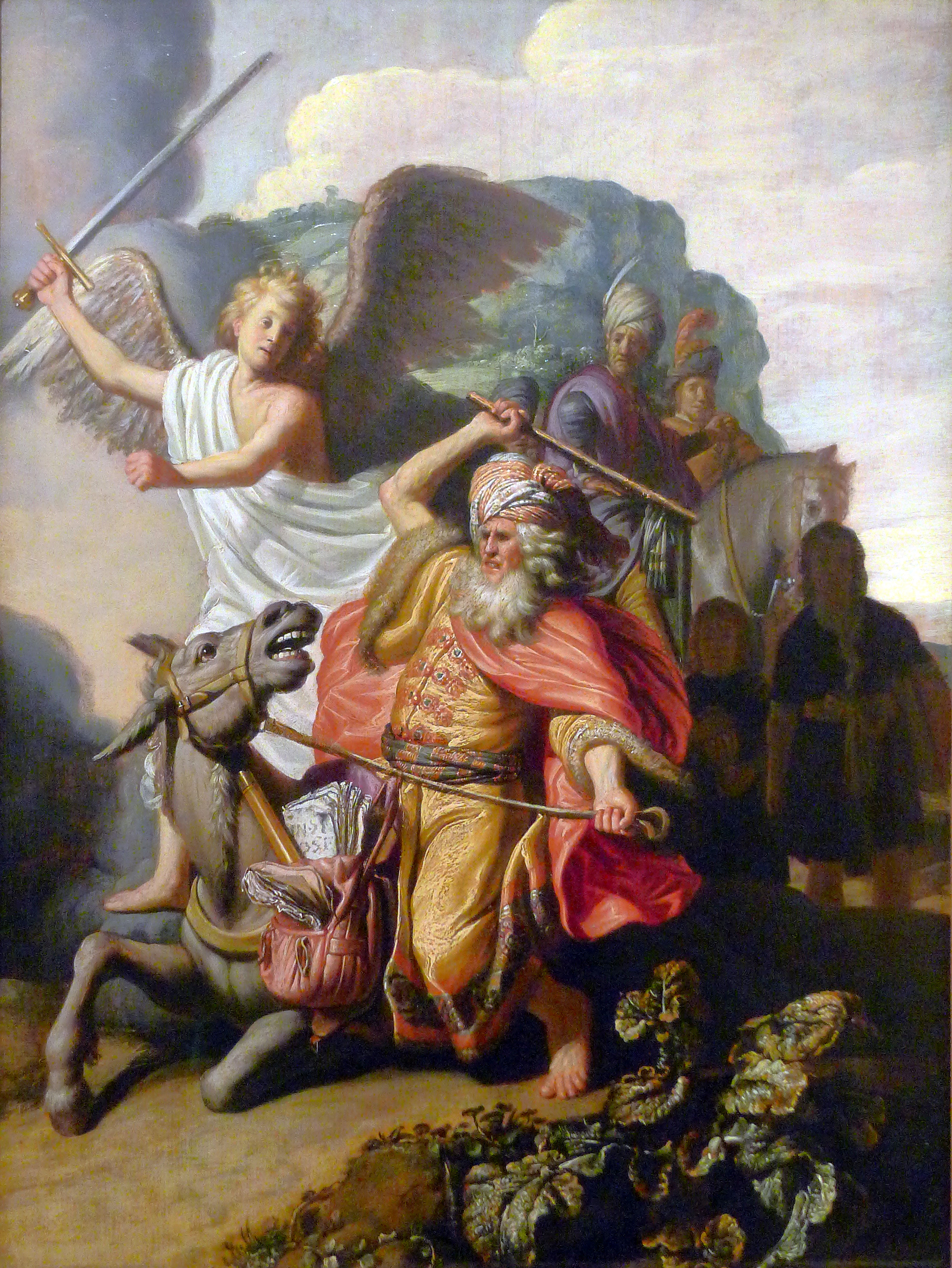
- Artist: Rembrandt
- Year: 1626
- Medium: oil paint, oak panel
- Dimensions: 63 cm (25 in) × 46.5 cm (18.3 in)
- Location: Musée Cognacq-Jay, France
- Owner: Alfonso Lopez, Jacques Goudstikker
- Accession: J 95

Balaam and the Ass is a 1626 Baroque painting by the Dutch artist Rembrandt, dating from his time in Leiden and now in the Musée Cognacq-Jay in Paris. The work shows the biblical scene of the pagan prophet Balaam about to strike his ass next to an angel.

== Subject and description ==
In the Book of Numbers, Balak, the king of Moab, sent for a foreign diviner, Balaam, to curse the arriving Israelites. Balaam, after conversing with God, was disallowed to follow Balak's embassy. Eventually, with God's permission and Balak's incessant requests, Balaam began to ride his ass west from the Tigris-Euphrates valley to Moab.

After his donkey sensed an angel on the narrow path, she turned aside. Balaam, ignorant to the angel, hits his ass thrice. The donkey, now with the ability to speak, then asks "what have I done to you, that you have struck me these three times?" Balaam, after conversing with the ass, is given the ability to see the angel and repents; the angel then commands Balaam to only speak what God commands him to speak with he meets Balak.

Rembrandt depicts Balaam, accompanied with two attendants and escorted by others, prepared to strike his ass for the third time; however, he is oblivious to the angel standing behind, holding a sword. The angel's position (behind Balaam), while being contrary to the biblical text, squeezes the characters closer together, contributing to its verticality.

Rembrandt depicts the story's irony that Balaam, a prophet, is unable to see the angel while his donkey can via giving Balaam blind eyes and donkey wide, sapient eyes (reflecting her ability to see the angel). He furthers this irony with the juxtaposition of Balaam's exorbitant dress— rich in a Baroque-Oriental style— with his stumbling posture, missing shoe, and the strong yet gentle presence of the muscular angel behind him.

== Analysis ==
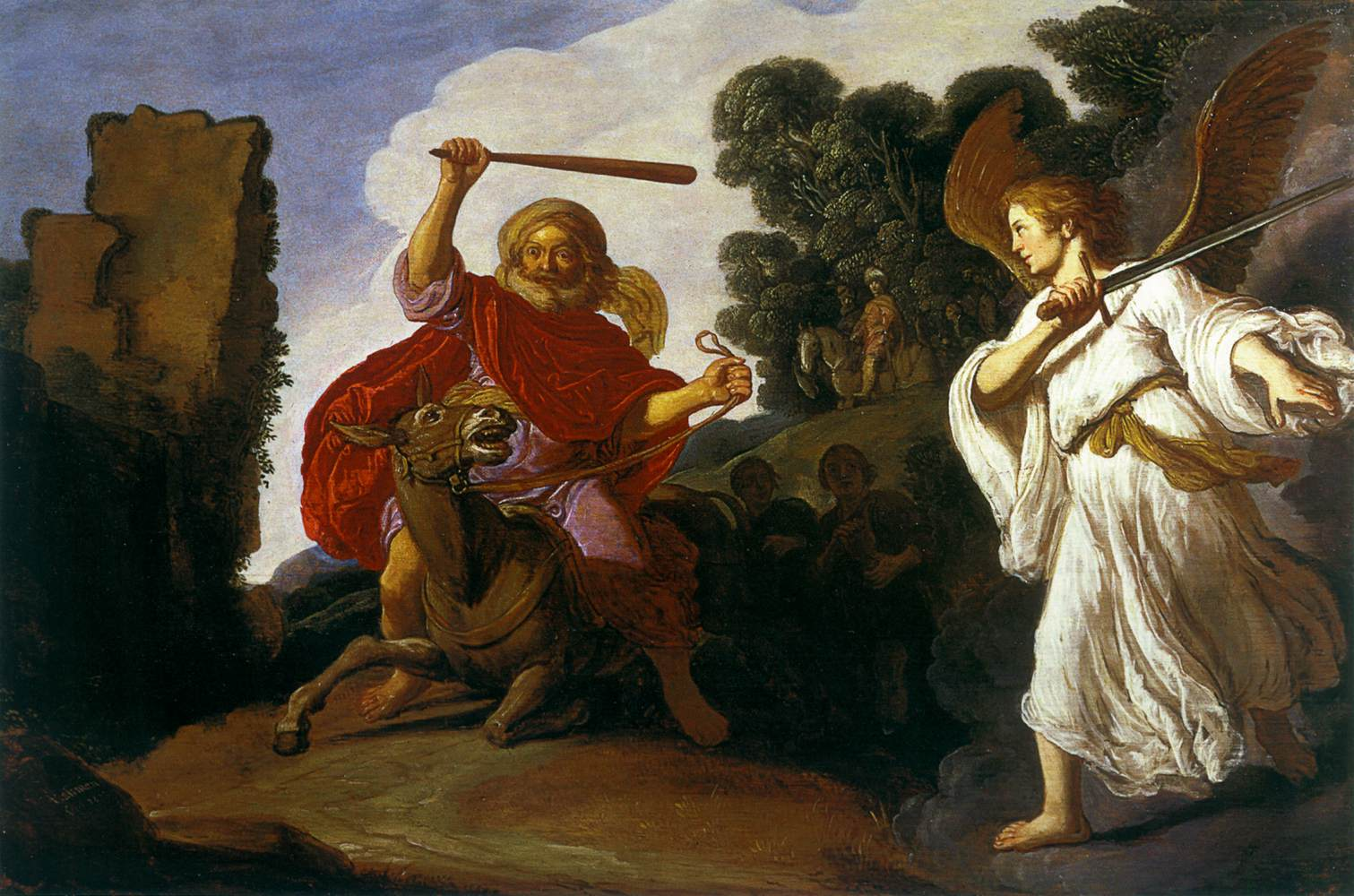
Pieter Lastman, Balaam and his Ass

The painting is a quintessential piece of the early work of Rembrandt. It is secured in a oak panel with a minor crack and signed with the monogram "RH" and the date. Balaam and the Ass' shares in type, size, and style with Rembrandt's The Baptism of the Eunuch. The painting inhibits the Baroque period with its intense dynamism and chiaroscuro.

The scene is based on Rembrandt's teacher Pieter Lastman's composition of the same subject from 1622, now in the Israel Museum Collection, Jerusalem. Notable in Rembrandt's alterations are him enlarging the figures and placing them in a vertical format (a preference of the artist) which heighten the drama of the scene. Some, such as Colin G. Campbell, argue the spatial arrangement was inspired from a Roman relief. Art historians such as Kurt Bauch suggest Rembrandt deviates from previous depictions (like that of Lastman) and the biblical account of this scene by putting the angel behind (as opposed to in front, blocking) Balaam's path to emphasize the spiritual notion that Balaam is blind to the angel in front of him.

== History ==
The painting was bought by a wealthy Jewish Spaniard, Alfonso López, in 1626. Balaam and his Ass, along with the others López's other painting, was auctioned off in 1641, eventually entering the collection of Simon Maris. The work then appeared in the possession of Jacques Goudstikker in 1905, the collection of Gustav Ritter Hoschek von Miihlheim in 1907, Franz Kleinberger, the collection of Ferdinand Hermann, and finally the collection Ernest Cognacq before being given to Paris in 1928. The work is now held in Paris' Musée Cognacq-Jay.

Rembrandt's Balaam and his Ass has influenced other works such as Barent Fabritius's 1672 work of the same title.

== See also ==
- List of paintings by Rembrandt
