= Paris Musées =

French public institution

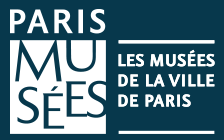
Logo

Paris Musées (French: [paʁi myze]) is a public institution which has incorporated the fourteen City of Paris museums and the staff in charge of management, collection monitoring and the production of exhibitions, events and editions, bringing together about 1,000 employees. The headquarters is at 27 Rue des Petites-Écuries in the 10th arrondissement of Paris.

== List of museums ==
The City of Paris museums are:

- Musée d'Art Moderne de la Ville de Paris
- Maison de Balzac
- Musée Bourdelle
- Carnavalet Museum History of Paris
- The Catacombs
- Musée Cernuschi Museum of Asian Art
- Musée Cognacq-Jay
- Archaeological Crypt of Notre-Dame
- Musée Galliera
- Museum of the General Leclerc and the Paris’ Liberation – Jean Moulin Museum
- Petit Palais City of Paris Museum of Fine Arts
- Musée de la Vie Romantique
- Maison de Victor Hugo Paris / Guernsey
- Musée Zadkine

== History ==
Before 1 January 2013, museums were managed directly by the City of Paris, with a contractor, the former company Paris Musées, in charge of the production of exhibitions and catalogues.

Paris Musées was alternately a non-profit organization created in 1985, then a limited company and public contractor per 28 February 2008, and since 1 January 2013, a public institution, an établissement public local, à caractère administratif.

Paris Musées's main mission is to manage the museums attached to it and allow them and their directors to run their scientific and cultural projects. The headquarters staff's responsibility is to ensure the overarching cultural program is coherent and that priorities and goals fixed by the City of Paris are achieved, especially those concerning temporary exhibitions, catalogues and other cultural editions, educational and cultural programs.

=== Reform goals ===
This reform was decided by the mayor of Paris, Bertrand Delanoë, to promote and enhance the City of Paris museums network.

The legal and financial autonomy given by the new entity, independent from the City of Paris’ administration, will facilitate management and responsiveness, as was the case for the major national museums. Keeping all museums in a single entity maintains the uniqueness of the municipal collection and enables the input of a more coherent strategy, therefore allowing economies of scale and better interactions between museums.

=== Priorities ===
Priorities fixed by the City of Paris:

- Develop and highlight the museums' collections. Through their computerization and digitization, research, programming of various events and exhibitions meant to make the municipal collections more known. Access to the City of Paris museums' collections is free since 2001.
- Produce high-quality exhibitions and publications, contributing to the cultural wealth and influence of Paris, nationally and internationally.
- Develop and expand audience reach through reinforced educational policies and a major focus on visit comfort and visitors programs. Today, the City of Paris's museums host more than 2 million visitors a year. Paris Musées aims at strengthening their figures and making culture more accessible to visitors.

== Board of directors and executive office ==
The public institution Paris Musées was created at the Council of Paris session of 20 June 2012. Its first board meeting took place on 12 July 2012. First Deputy Mayor Anne Hidalgo became its chair. Danièle Pourtaud, deputy mayor for heritage, became vice chair.

The Board of Directors counts nine Paris counseling members:

- Geneviève Bertrand
- Céline Boulay-Espéronnier
- Danielle Fournier
- Christophe Girard
- Bruno Julliard
- Hélène Macé de Lepinay
- Danielle Simonnet

The Board also counts four qualified and renowned members:

- Martin Bethenod, director of the Palazzo Grassi in Venice
- Jean-François Chougnet, director of Marseille-Provence 2013
- Gaïta Leboissetier, deputy director, in charge of education at the National Superior School of Fine Arts
- Antoinette Le Normand-Romain, executive director at the National Institute of Art History

Delphine Levy, who conducted the reform's project, was designated chief executive director.

== See also ==
- Tourism in Paris
