= Bernard Poyet =

French architect (1742–1824)

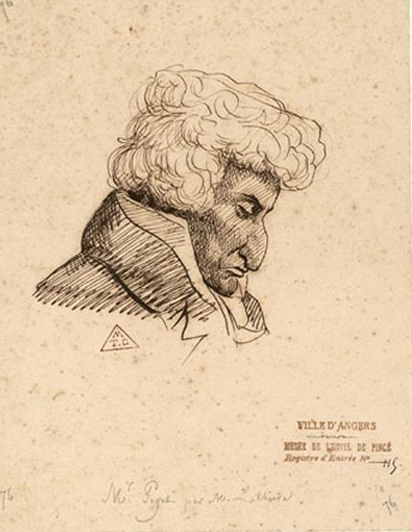
Bernard Poyet; sketch by Guillaume Guillon-Lethière

Bernard Poyet (French: [bɛʁnaʁ pwajɛ]; 3 May 1742 – 6 December 1824) was a French architect, best known for his work on the Palais Bourbon in Paris.

== Biography ==
A native of Dijon, Poyet was a student of Charles de Wailly who, in 1766, charged him with supervising the construction of a barn stable at the Château des Ormes. Although a utilitarian structure, it included the installation of a sculpted pediment, depicting the goddess Cybele, by the King's sculptor, Augustin Pajou. In 1768, he took second place at the Prix de Rome with a project for a comic theatre. The following year, he obtained a stipend for a stay as a boarder at the Académie de France à Rome. Upon his departure, his proposals for a new main building at the château were taken up by another student of De Wailly's, who worked on the project until 1783.

Upon his return, he was named official architect to Louis Philippe I, Duke of Orléans and oversaw some small construction projects in the suburbs. In 1786, he was admitted to the Académie royale d'architecture and appointed Public Works Inspector for the City of Paris. During this time, he worked on reconstructing the 13th century church of Saint-Sauveur and enlarging the Sainte-Anne Hospital Centre.

In 1790, Poyet was named Architect of the City of Paris; he was made responsible for the city's water supply, which involved relocating the Fontaine des Innocents. In 1806, as a close associate of Lucien Bonaparte, he was entrusted to redesign and replace the decorations on the façade of the Palais Bourbon facing the Seine. His private commissions included the Hôtel de la Princesse Mathilde (1812). He was elected to the Académie des Beaux-Arts in 1818, taking the eighth seat for architecture.

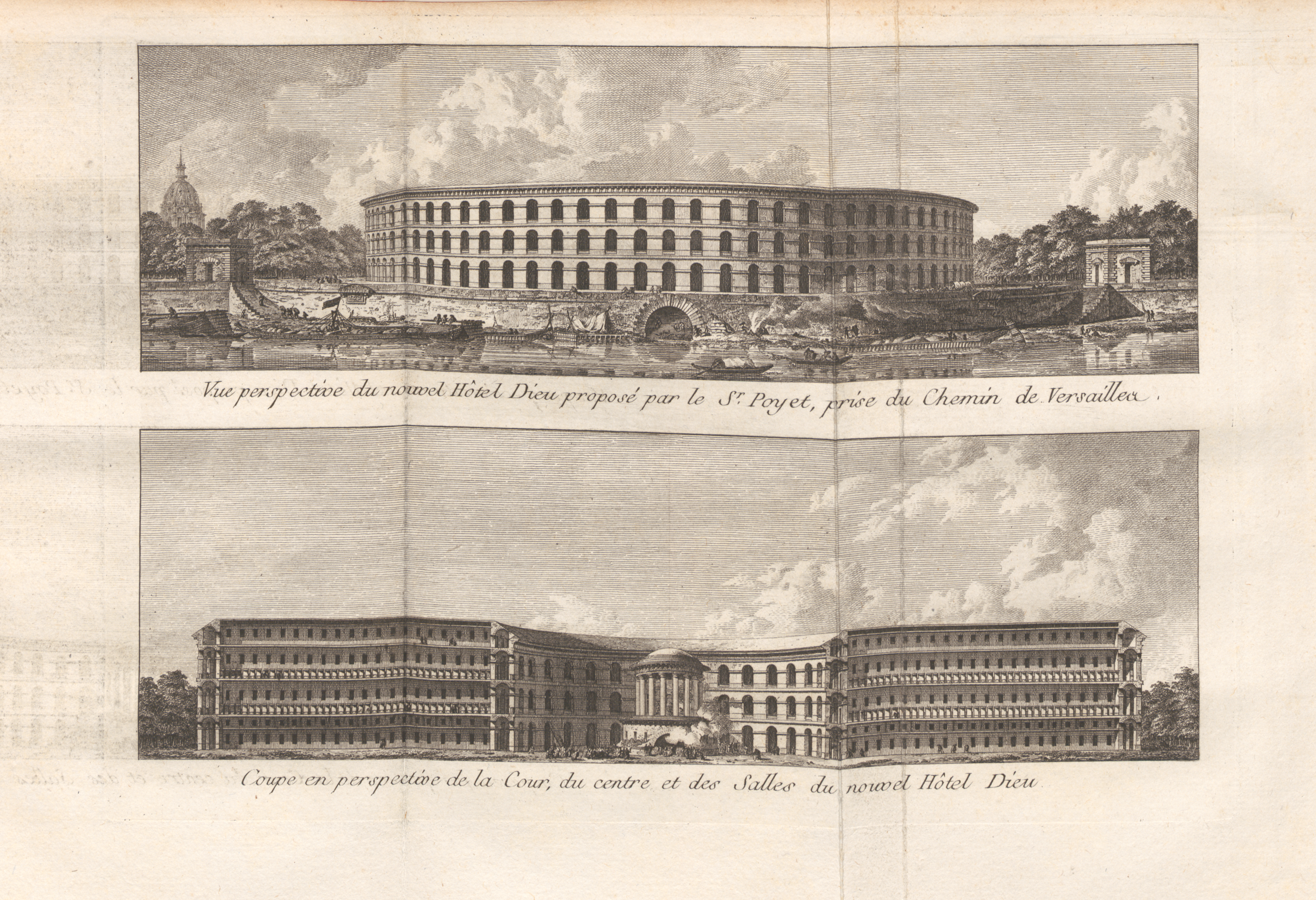
Poyet's proposal for a new Hôtel-Dieu in Paris (1785)

Several large projects were never realised; notably a plan to reconstruct the Hôtel-Dieu on the Île des Cygnes, in circular form, modelled after the Colosseum, with 5,000 beds. It would have been 200 metres (app. 656 feet) wide, with three floors and a central courtyard. In 1786, a nine-member commission from the French Academy of Sciences examined the proposal, but found it too large, unsuited for the location, as well as much too expensive.

Throughout his career, Poyet wrote memoirs and books on architecture. He died in Paris, where he was interred at the Père Lachaise Cemetery.
