= Maison de Balzac =

Writer's house museum in Paris, France

Coordinates: 48°51′19″N 2°16′51″E

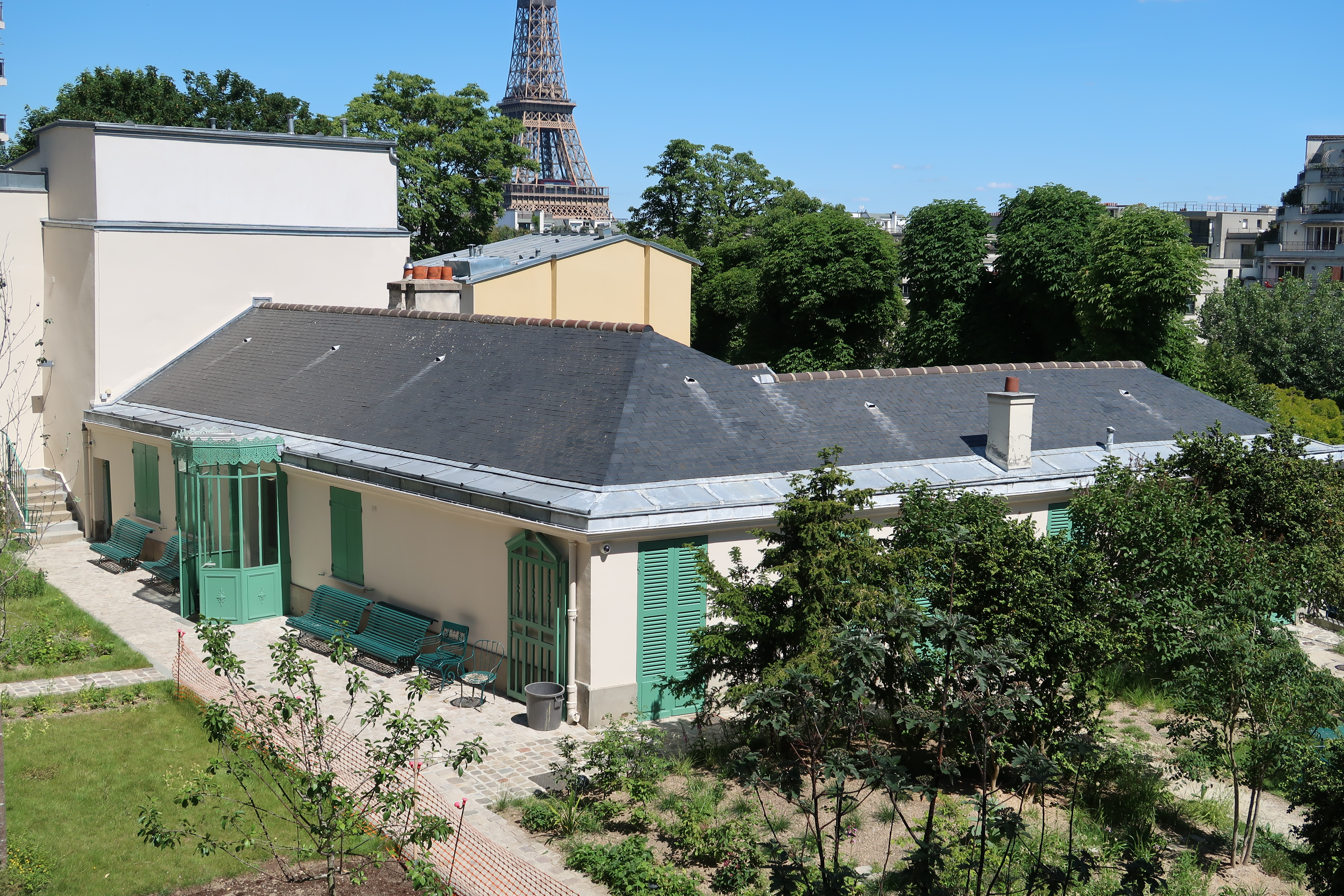
- Maison de Balzac
- Location: 47, Rue Raynouard, 16th arrondissement, Paris, France

The Maison de Balzac (French pronunciation: [mɛzɔ̃ d(ə) balzak]; lit. 'House of Balzac') is a writer's house museum in Paris in the former residence of French novelist Honoré de Balzac (1799–1850). It is located in the 16th arrondissement at 47, Rue Raynouard. It is open daily except Mondays and holidays; admission to the house is free, but a fee is charged for its temporary exhibitions. The nearest Métro and RER stations are Passy and Avenue du Président Kennedy.

The modest house, with its courtyard and garden, is located within the residential district of Passy near the Bois de Boulogne. Having fled his creditors, Balzac rented its top floor from 1840 to 1847, under his housekeeper's name (Mr. de Breugnol). It was acquired by the city of Paris in 1949, and is now one of the city's three literary museums, along with the Maison de Victor Hugo and the Musée de la Vie Romantique (George Sand). It is the only one of Balzac's many residences still in existence.

Balzac's five-room apartment was located on the top floor, at three levels, and as today opened into the garden. Here he edited La Comedie humaine and wrote some of his finest novels, including La Rabouilleuse, Une ténébreuse affaire, and La Cousine Bette. Although the writer's furniture was dispersed after his widow's death, the museum now contains Balzac's writing desk and chair, his turquoise-studded cane by Lecointe (1834), and his tea kettle and a coffee pot given to him by Zulma Carraud in 1832.

The museum also contains an 1842 daguerreotype of Balzac by Louis-Auguste Bisson, a drawing of Balzac by Paul Gavarni (c. 1840), a pastel portrait (c. 1798) of Balzac's mother Laure Sallambier (1778–1854), an oil portrait (c. 1795–1814) of his father Bernard-François Balzac (1746–1829), and 19th-century prints by renowned artists including Paul Gavarni, Honoré Daumier, Grandville, and Henry Bonaventure Monnier.

Since 1971, the house's ground floor has contained a library of the author's manuscripts, original and subsequent editions, illustrations, books annotated and signed by Balzac, books devoted to Balzac, and other books and magazines of the period.

In 2012, Balzac's House was renovated in order to meet current standards and now has a more modern appearance.

The house is also notable for underlying cavities which have been identified by pottery shards as former troglodyte dwellings dated to the time of the late Middle Ages. These excavations, however, are not open to the public.

Balzac's House is one of the 14 City of Paris' Museums that have been incorporated since January 1, 2013, in the public institution Paris Musées.

On July 23, 2019, the museum reopened, after work carried out on its unchanged site, with accessibility for people with disabilities, the creation of a café and a reception area and the redevelopment of the garden and the permanent route.

In order to highlight the museum, a Balzac prize is created in 2021 on the initiative of the mayor of the 16th arrondissement Francis Szpiner. The journalist and writer Pierre Assouline was chosen to preside over the jury which aims to reward “a work of contemporary fiction written not 'in the manner of Balzac' but in which we recognize the Balzacian imprint on the author”.

== Theater at the Maison de Balzac ==
- 1993: The Muse of the Department
- 1994 and 1999: Letters of Two Brides
- 1998: Eugenie Grandet or history of a still life
- 2012: Seraphita, adapted and directed by Ouriel Zohar, with Barbara Heman

== See also ==
- List of museums in Paris
- List of works by Alexandre Falguière
