= Walid Daqqa =

Palestinian prisoner, novelist and activist (1961–2024)

- وليد دقة
- Born: 18 July 1961; Baqa al-Gharbiyye, Israel
- Died: 7 April 2024 (aged 62); Shamir Medical Center, Be'er Ya'akov, Israel
- Notable work: The Tale of the Secrets of Oil; Fusion of Consciousness; A Parallel Time.

Walid Nimer As'aad Daqqa (Arabic: وليد نمر أسعد دقّة; 18 July 1961 – 7 April 2024) was a Palestinian prisoner and novelist who was imprisoned for 38 years after he was convicted of commanding a Popular Front for the Liberation of Palestine (PFLP)-affiliated group that abducted and killed an Israeli soldier. He was not convicted of the murder, but of commanding the group, a charge he rejected. Daqqa was the longest-serving Palestinian prisoner in Israeli jails.

Daqqa, a Palestinian citizen of Israel, was born in Baqa al-Gharbiyye in 1961. In 1984, a group of Arab Israelis affiliated with the PFLP abducted and killed an Israeli soldier. Daqqa was arrested two years later, charged with commanding the responsible group. His conviction by an Israeli military court was based on old British emergency regulations. He received a life sentence without parole, but his sentence was later reduced to 37 years.

During his imprisonment, he got married in 1999, and had a child in 2020 when his sperm was smuggled. Daqqa also completed both a bachelor's and master's degree in political science, and had been working on his doctorate. He authored several prison literature works, including a children's novel in 2018 that narrates the story of a boy, who uses magical olive oil from the Israeli-occupied West Bank to visit his imprisoned father.

In 2021, Daqqa was diagnosed with cancer, prompting calls for his release upon completion of his original sentence in 2023, but he had received a further two-year sentence in 2018 for smuggling mobile phones to prisoners. Amnesty International reported that Daqqa's lawyer who had visited him a few weeks before his death said that Daqqa had lost much weight and was subjected to torture. After Daqqa's death on 9 April 2024, Israeli police forcefully dispersed visitors who attended his funeral.

== Biography ==
Daqqa was born in the predominantly Arab city of Baqa al-Gharbiyye, Israel, in 1961, and was a Palestinian citizen of Israel. In adulthood he earned his living as a housepainter, working in Tel Aviv and Eilat. He was radicalized by the shock of the Israeli invasion of Lebanon and the Sabra and Shatila massacre, and subsequently joined the Popular Front for the Liberation of Palestine (PFLP) in 1983.

In 1984, he was chosen to receive military training in Syria, there contributing to the formation of a "secret military apparatus". Its purpose was to collect information about Israeli leaders and officials who participated in the 1982 Israeli invasion of Lebanon, in order to kidnap soldiers with the aim of exchanging them for Palestinian and Arab prisoners detained in Israeli prison. On 6 August 1984, a group of Arab Israelis affiliated with the PFLP abducted an Israeli soldier named Moshe Tamam, who was on leave at the time, as he got off a bus near his home in the vicinity of Netanya. Tamam was found dead four days later, with "massive" head wounds.

Daqqa was arrested on 25 March 1986 and accused of either being a member or commander, of the PFLP-affiliated group that abducted and killed Tamam. Daqqa was not present at the time of the abduction and, in March 1987 was convicted of commanding the group, an accusation he always denied. The Palestinian state news agency Wafa described Daqqa as a "freedom fighter" and described the PFLP members convicted of killing Tamam as "his companions". According to Amnesty International, his conviction was based on emergency regulations enacted by British authorities in Mandatory Palestine, which allow for a lower threshold for proof than the criteria used in Israeli criminal law. He received a life sentence without parole, but his sentence was later reduced to 37 years. Daqqa was among 23 Palestinians held by Israel since before the Oslo Accords were signed in the 1990s. Daqqa joined Balad in 1996, later serving as a member of the party's Central Committee.

In 1999, while in prison, he married Sanaa Salameh, a lawyer from Tira, after he obtained a rare permission for the wedding, and for photos of the ceremony to be taken. But he was not allowed to spend time with his wife in conjugal visits. Writing an open letter from prison in 2011, Daqqa expressed his desire for a child, who he would name Milad. The couple had a daughter in 2020, conceived after his sperm was smuggled out of prison. For this he was punished with a period of solitary confinement. Daqqa received bachelor's and master's degrees in political science in 2010 and 2016 respectively, and was reported in 2018 to have been working on his doctorate.

== Works ==
Daqqa wrote several books during his imprisonment, several of which have been described as being prison literature, and on politics and philosophy, and also a children's story. His works include The Tale of the Secrets of Oil, Fusion of Consciousness and A Parallel Time. The latter book, together with material from a long letter he had written to former MK Azmi Bishara, was adapted into a play and staged at the Al-Midan Theater in Haifa, and talks about the psychological state of prisoners. In the wake of the controversy over its staging, the theatre eventually lost half of its budget. Upon the launch of his children's novel titled The Tale of the Secrets of Oil in 2018, which talks about children of prisoners, it was reported that Daqqa was planning to write a sequel titled: "The Tale of the Secret of the Sword", addressing refugees and their right of return.

=== The Tale of the Secrets of Oil ===
In 2018, Daqqa authored his first children's novel, which was launched at the Mahmoud Darwish Museum in Ramallah, the Israeli-occupied West Bank. The Tale of the Secrets of Oil narrates the story of a 12-year-old boy named Jude, who was conceived with his imprisoned father's sperm. It begins as the boy prepares to meet his father for the first time in prison, but Jude receives news that, "due to security reasons," his visit had been cancelled. Jude, who is heartbroken, goes for a walk in the countryside, engaging in a conversation with different species, including a rabbit, a cat, and eventually an olive tree named Um Rumi, who is 1,500-year-old. They all listen to the boy's frustration over his canceled prison visit, and tell him of their suffering under the occupation and their struggle for freedom.

Um Rumi, the olive tree, tells the boy of her experience when Israel had threatened to uproot her so that she could be moved from the West Bank to the Israeli city of Afula. Afterwards, she tells the boy about her sacred oil, which she had been keeping as a secret. Jude rubs the oil on his skin, making him invisible, which helps him visit his father in prison. Upon hearing a child's voice say, "I am your son, Jude," his father thinks that he is losing his mind.

The oil mentioned in the novel is made in reference to Jesus, whose oil was claimed to be able to heal people's wounds. At the end of the book, Daqqa compares the literal prison to "a [metaphorical] larger one where Palestinians in the territories live under siege." Daqqa mentions in the prelude of the novel that he is writing: "until I am freed from prison, with the hope of freeing the prison from me." The explained goal of his novel is followed by the dedication: "To Jude, that he may live his childhood, to all the children who have become adults before their time and to all the adults who have been deprived of a taste of childhood by prison."

== Death ==
In 2021, Daqqa was diagnosed with a rare form of bone cancer, myelofibrosis, that disrupts blood cell production. Palestinian human rights activists accused Israel of medical negligence, worsening his condition. He was due to be released in March 2023 on completion of his sentence, but he had already received a further two years sentence in 2018 for smuggling mobile phones to distribute to other prisoners to contact their families. Amnesty International reported that Daqqa's lawyer who had visited him on 24 March 2024 was "shocked by his sharp weight loss and visible fragility," and accordingly, said that denying prisoners from access to medical care may constitute torture. It also reported that his lawyer stated that Daqqa was subjected to torture by the Israel Prison Service, including beatings and humiliation.

Daqqa died from complications of cancer on 7 April 2024, at the age 62, after 38 years in prison. His family was not informed of his decease by the Israeli authorities, and only learnt of his death through social media. The day after, the penultimate of Ramadan, with authorities ignoring requests for the release of his body, chairs had been arranged in the garden for visitors bringing condolences. Border police raided the garden and ordered the seats to be taken away. According to Gideon Levy, sitting and mourning were forbidden. By the late afternoon, while the customary mourning tent was being erected, a further police raid took place: the mourners were beaten, shoved aside, with five arrested and the mourning tent was then torn down.

At the time of his death, Daqqa was one of the most prominent and longtime Palestinian prisoners in Israeli custody. The Palestinian Commission of Detainee Affairs stated that Daqqa's death brought the number of Palestinians that have died in Israeli prisons since 1967, when Israel occupied the Palestinian territories, to 251. And his death was the 14th in Israeli custody since the start of the Gaza war on 7 October 2023, according to the Palestinian Prisoners Society. Daqqa's body has been retained by the Security Cabinet of Israel due to his prominence in the Palestinian cause. On September 30, 2024, the High Court rejected a petition calling for his body to be released, citing the Basic Law: Israel as the Nation-State of the Jewish People in its decision that a potential prisoner exchange outweighed Daqqa's right to dignity and the family's right to proper burial.

=== Reactions ===
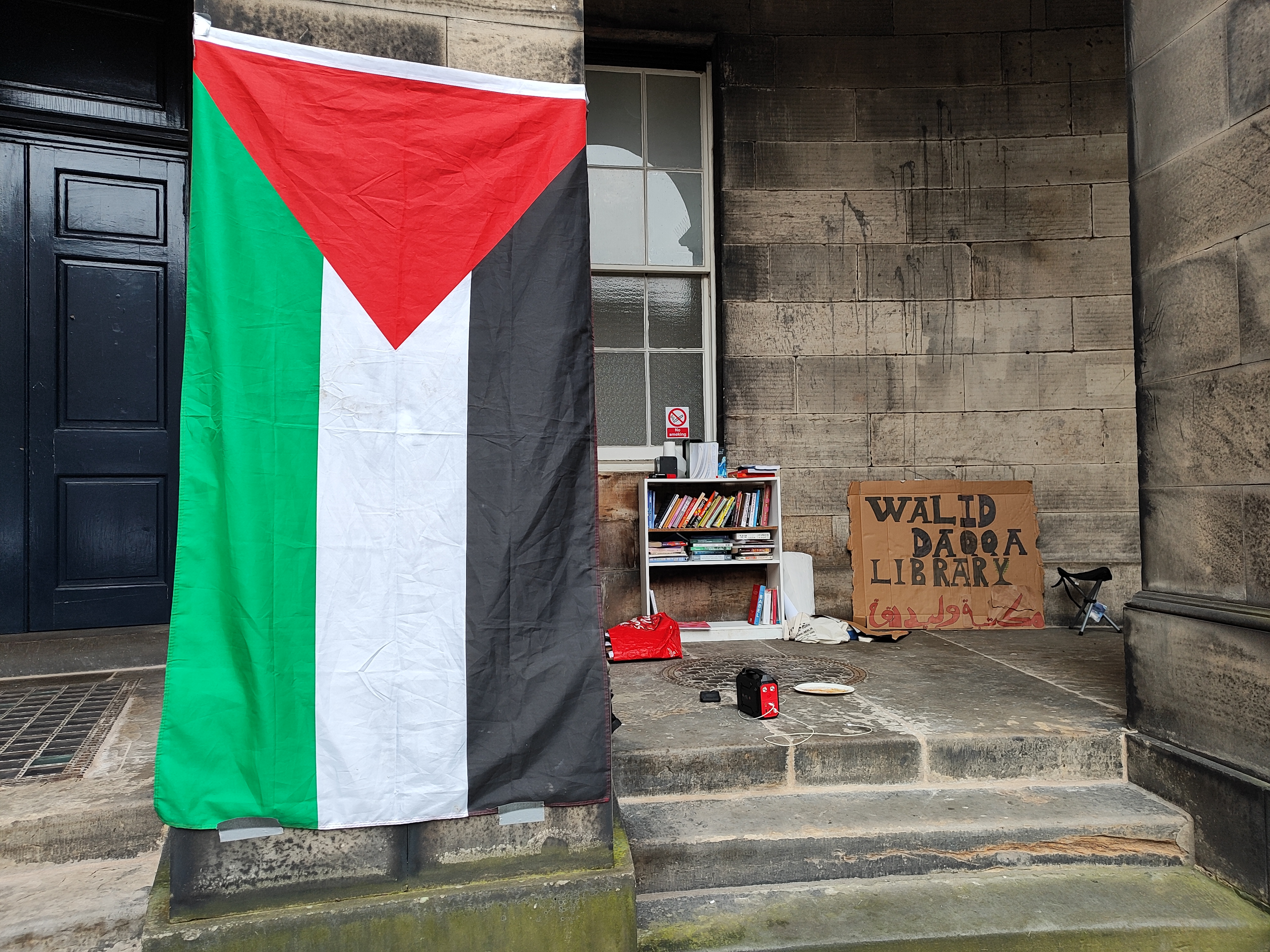
A tribute to Daqqa at University of Edinburgh encampment, 2024

Israeli police are reported to have intervened forcefully to disperse visitors who had approached his home in Baqa al-Gharbiyye to pay their respects to his family after his death was announced, arresting five mourners. Daqqa's brother stated that Itamar Ben-Gvir, the Israeli Minister of National Security had delayed the restitution of his body to his family for burial. Ben-Gvir remarked that he was unhappy with his natural death because it was not the "death penalty for terrorists" he considered appropriate. Senior researcher Erika Guevara Rosas at Amnesty International wrote upon Daqqa's death:

Even on his deathbed, Israeli authorities continued to display chilling levels of cruelty against Walid Daqqah and his family, not only denying him adequate medical treatment and suitable food, but also preventing him from saying a final goodbye to his wife Sanaa Salameh and their four-year-old daughter Milad.

In response to an Amnesty International report on Daqqa, the Israeli Foreign Ministry wrote in a social media post: "Amnesty, you have a disturbing obsession with glorifying sadistic murderers."

== See also ==
- Palestinians in Israeli custody
