= Séraphîta =

1834 novel by Honoré de Balzac

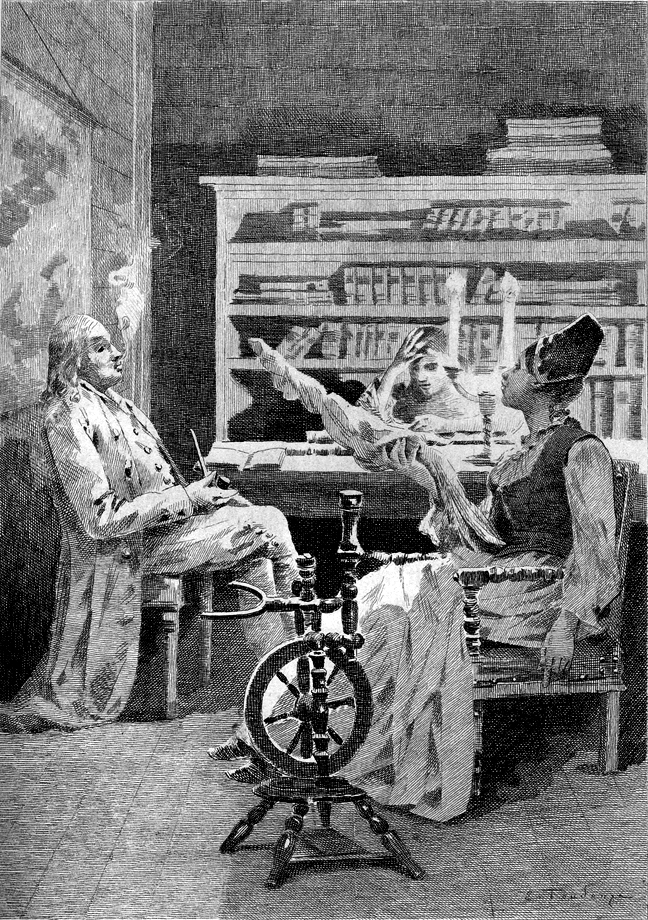
- Illustration from Séraphîta by Édouard Toudouze
- Author: Honoré de Balzac
- Language: French
- Series: La Comédie humaine
- Genre: Fiction
- Publication date: 1834
- Publication place: France

Séraphîta (French pronunciation: [seʁafita]) is a French novel by Honoré de Balzac with themes of androgyny. It was published in the Revue de Paris in 1834. In contrast with the realism of most of the author's best known works, the story delves into the fantastic and the supernatural to illustrate philosophical themes.

In a castle in Norway near the fjord Stromfjord, Séraphitüs, a strange and melancholic being, conceals a terrible secret. Séraphitüs loves Minna, and she returns this love, believing Séraphitüs to be a man. But Séraphitüs is also loved by Wilfrid, who considers Séraphitüs to be a woman (Séraphîta).

In reality, Séraphitüs-Séraphîta is a perfect androgyne, born to parents who by the doctrines of Emanuel Swedenborg have transcended their humanity, and Séraphitüs-Séraphîta is the perfect example of humanity.

Ruggero Leoncavallo wrote a symphonic poem based on the story.

An early drawing of Paul Gauguin's ceramic sculpture Oviri bears the inscription Et le monstre, entréignant sa créature, féconde de sa semence des flancs généreux pour engendrer Séraphitus-Séraphita ("And the monster, embracing its creation, filled her generous womb with seed and fathered Séraphitus-Séraphita"), referring to the novel.

From 2010 to 2014 Ouriel Zohar staged Seraphita, his adaptation of the novel starring Barbara Heman at the Théâtre de l'Île Saint-Louis in Paris, and then in several countries around the world.

== Sources ==
- Frèches-Thory, Claire (1988). "The Return to France". The Art of Paul Gauguin. with Peter Zegers. National Gallery of Art. pp. 369–73. ISBN 978-0-8212-1723-8. LCCN 88-81005.
