= Musée Cognacq-Jay =

Art museum in Paris, France

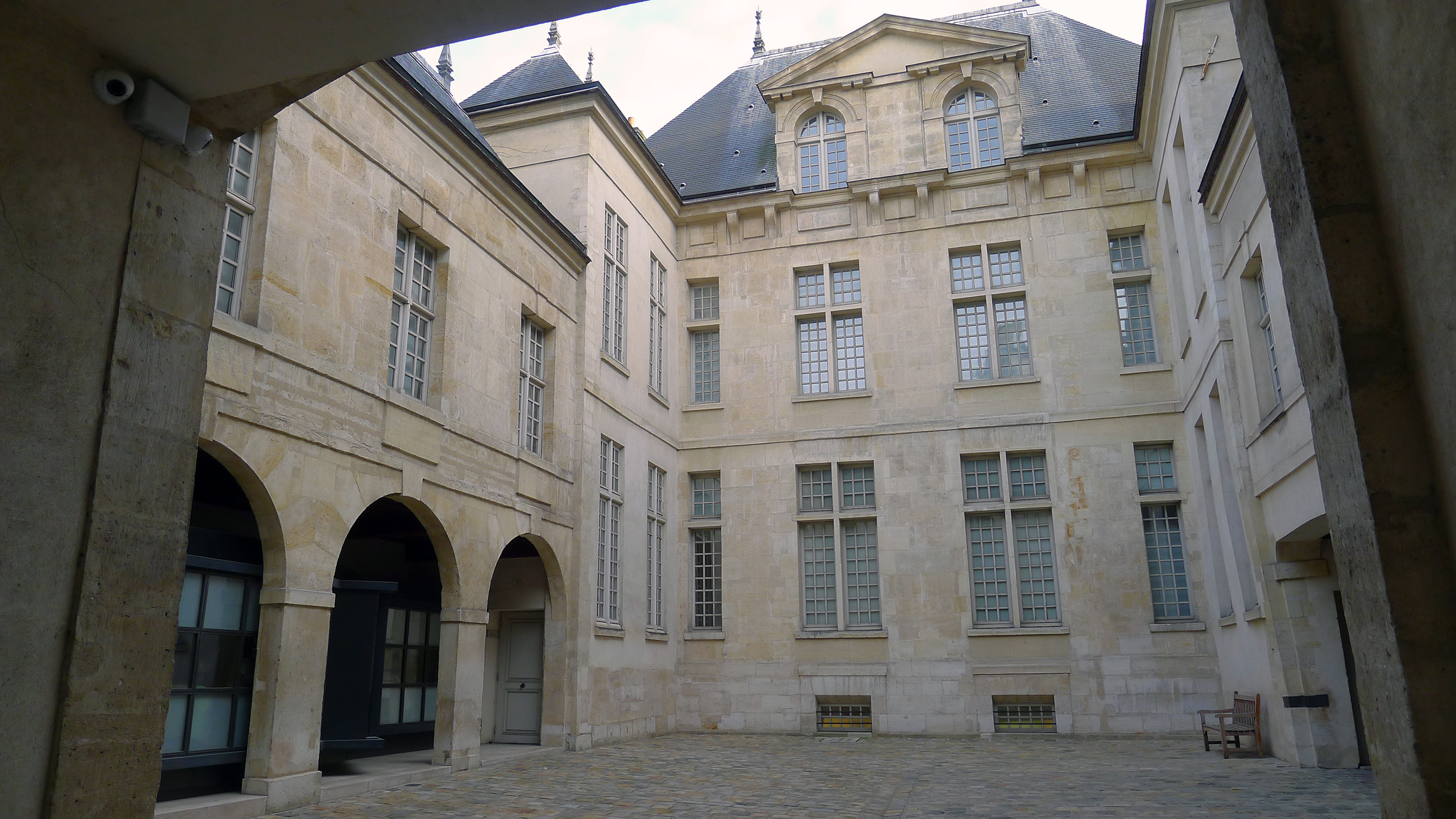
- Courtyard of the Hôtel de Donon
- Established: 1929; 97 years ago
- Location: 8 Rue Elzévir, 75003; Paris, France
- Coordinates: 48.858194°N 2.361389°E
- Type: Art museum
- Website: museecognacqjay.paris.fr

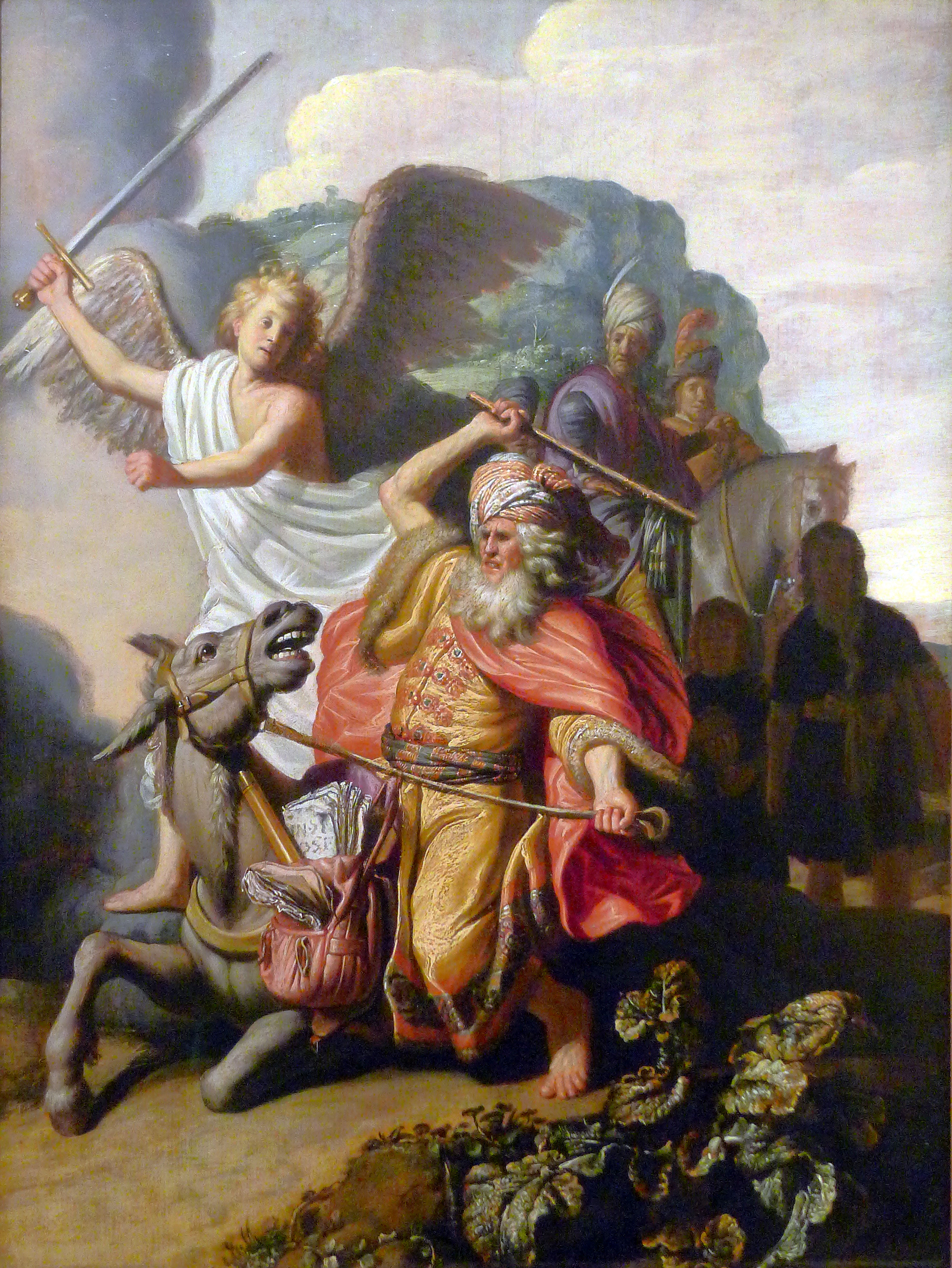
Balaam and the Ass by Rembrandt, part of the museum's permanent collection

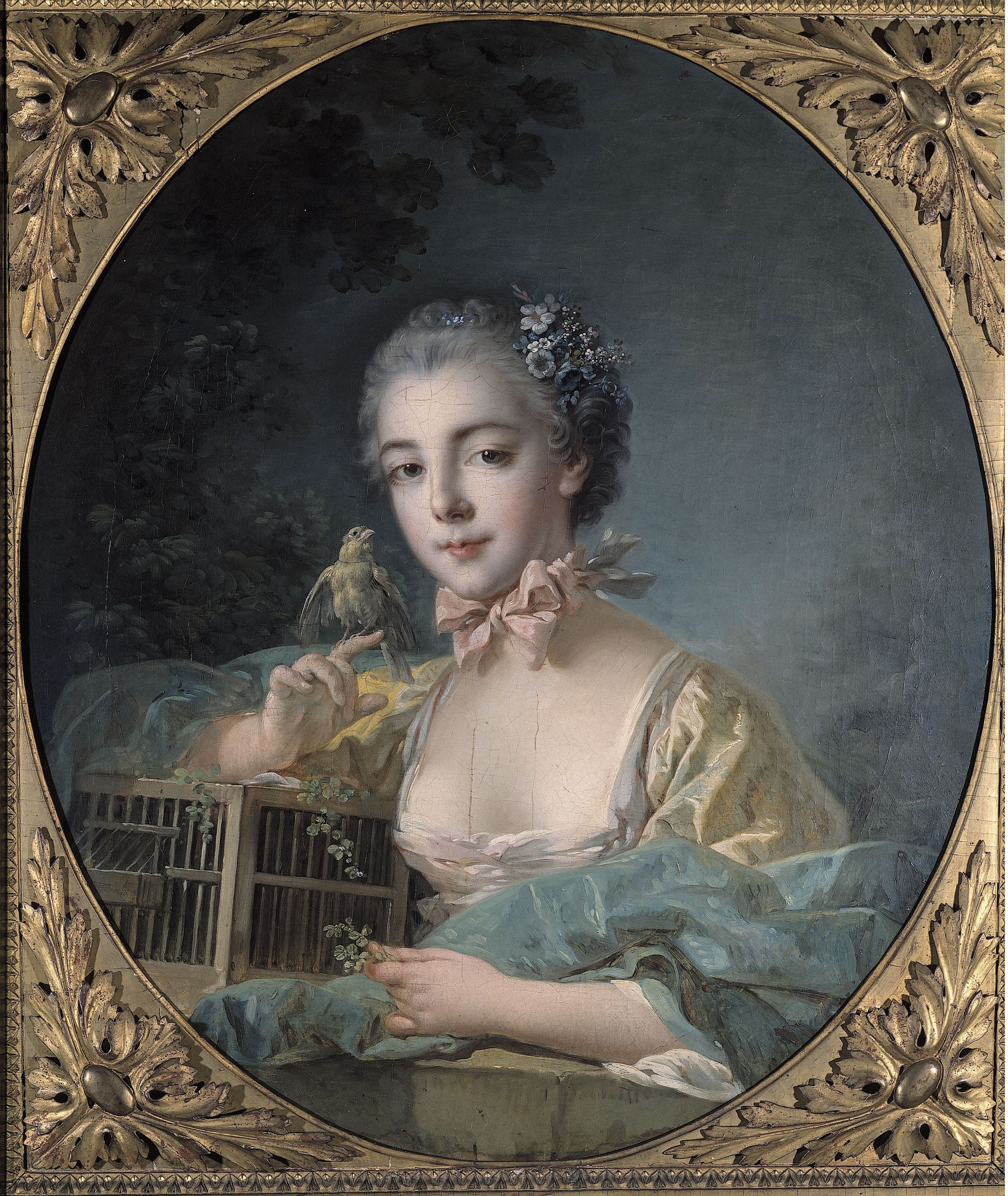
Portrait by François Boucher, c. 1760, in the Musée Cognacq-Jay

The Musée Cognacq-Jay (French: [myze kɔɲakʒɛ]; English: Cognacq-Jay Museum) is an art museum located in the Hôtel de Donon (or Hôtel Donon) in the 3rd arrondissement of Paris, France.

== Collection ==
The museum's collection was formed between 1900 and 1925 by Théodore-Ernest Cognacq and his wife Marie-Louise Jaÿ, founders of La Samaritaine department store. At his death, Cognacq gave the collection to the City of Paris, which in 1929 inaugurated the Musée Cognacq-Jay at 25 boulevard des Capucines, a building especially conceived for it by the Cognacq couple, who wished to display the collection in the intimacy of a seemingly inhabited home, without the conventions of a museum. In 1990 however, the City, arguing that the Boulevard des Capucines was not part of a "cultural circuit", sought the approval of the legal heirs (the owners of La Samaritaine), and, under silent disagreement of the Cognacq-Jay family, moved the collection to the ill-fitting Hôtel Donon (c. 1575) in the Marais, where the collection is displayed in twenty paneled rooms (four floors) in the styles of Louis XV and Louis XVI. The renovation work of the Hôtel Donon was led by Paris's chief architect Bernard Fonquernie, whilst the interior renovation was done by Reoven Vardi.

The museum contains an exceptional collection of fine art and decorative items, about 1200 items in total, with an emphasis on 18th century France, ranging from European and Chinese ceramics, jewels, and snuffboxes, to paintings by Louis-Léopold Boilly, François Boucher, Canaletto, Jean-Siméon Chardin, Jean-Honoré Fragonard, Jean-Baptiste Greuze, Maurice Quentin de La Tour, Sir Thomas Lawrence, Hubert Robert, Giovanni Battista Tiepolo, and Jean-Antoine Watteau; sculpture by Jean-Antoine Houdon, Jean-Baptiste Lemoyne, and Jacques-François-Joseph Saly; and fine furniture attributed to Jean-François Oeben and Roger Vandercruse Lacroix. The 17th century is also represented, notably with two paintings by Rembrandt, while the 19th century is represented with works by Camille Corot, Paul Cézanne and also Edgar Degas.

The Cognacq-Jay Museum is one of the 14 museums that have been incorporated since 1 January 2013 in the public institution Paris Musées.

In November 2024, several artefacts were stolen from the museum after thieves broke open a display case using axes and bats.

== Gallery ==
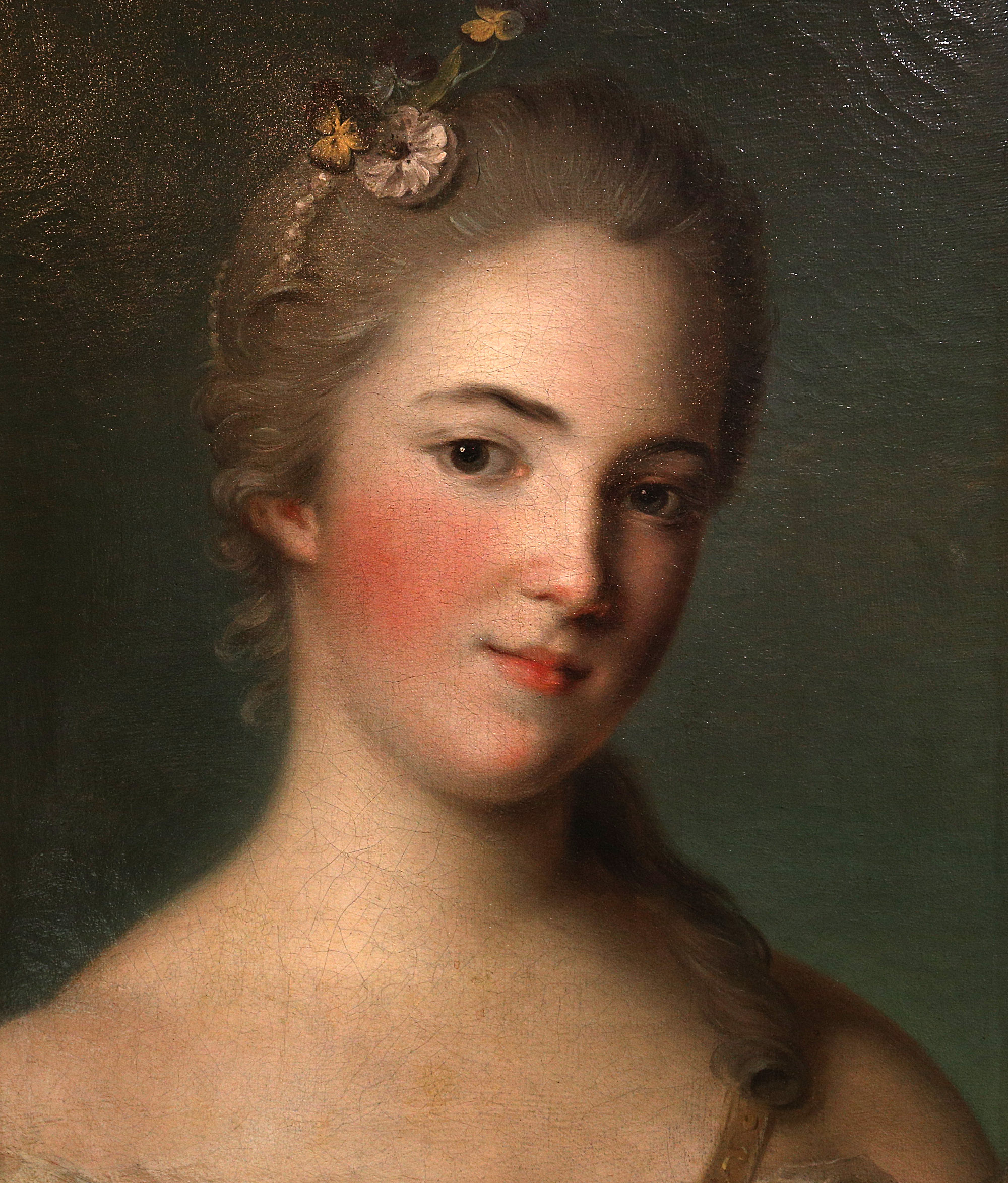
Artwork by François Boucher in Cognac-Jay museum

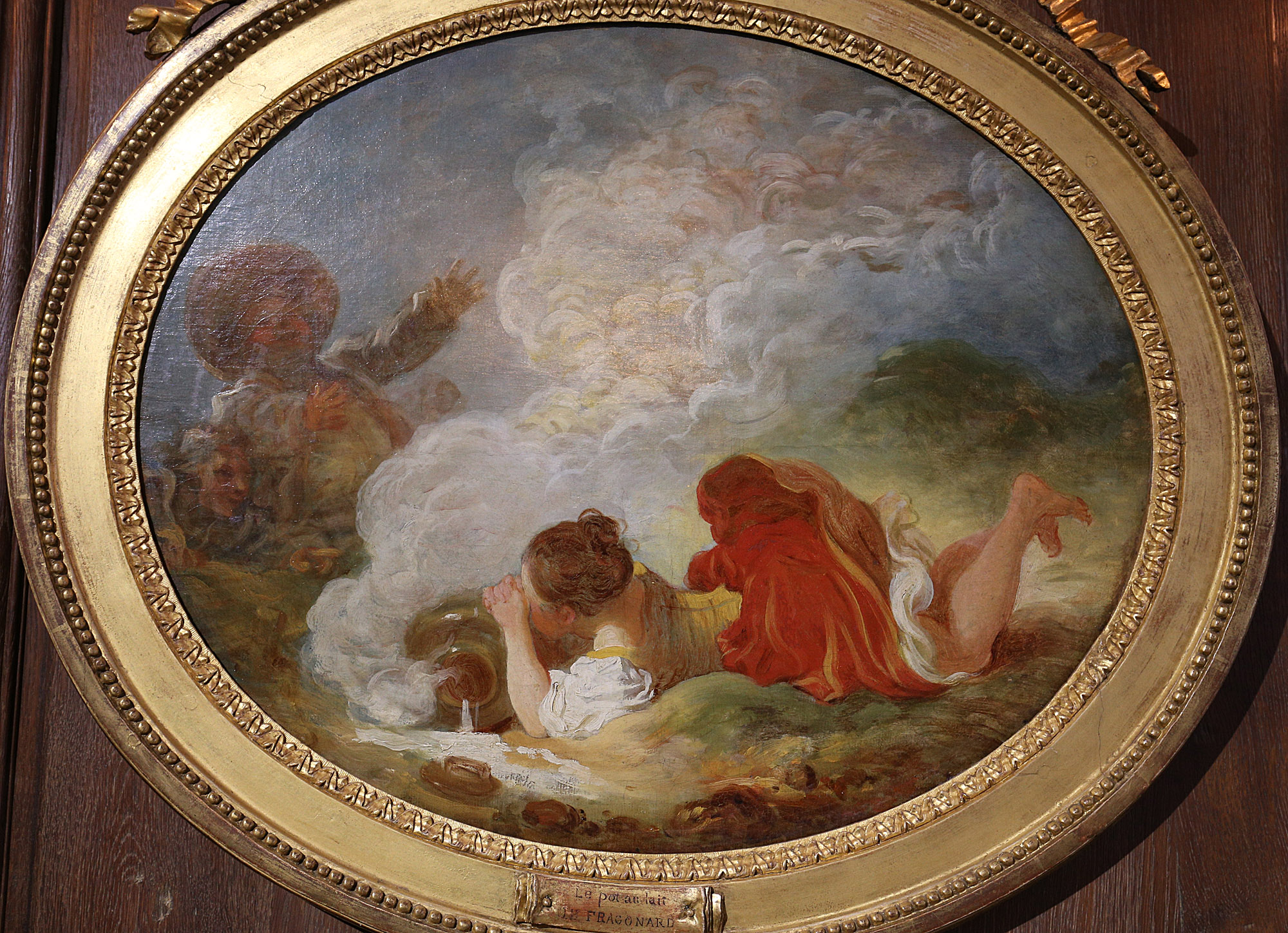
Artwork by François Boucher in Cognac-Jay museum

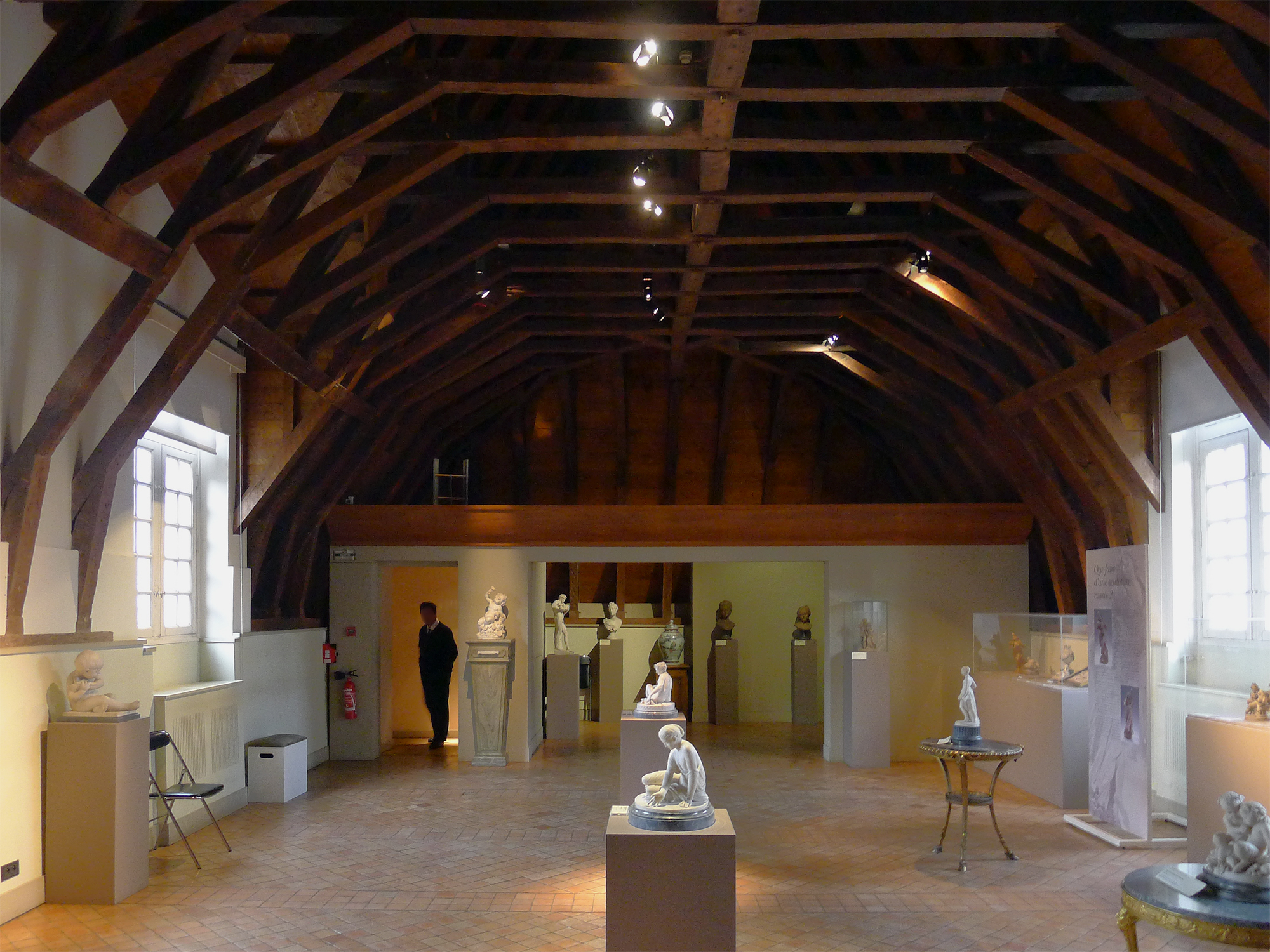
The exhibition hall under the big fill.

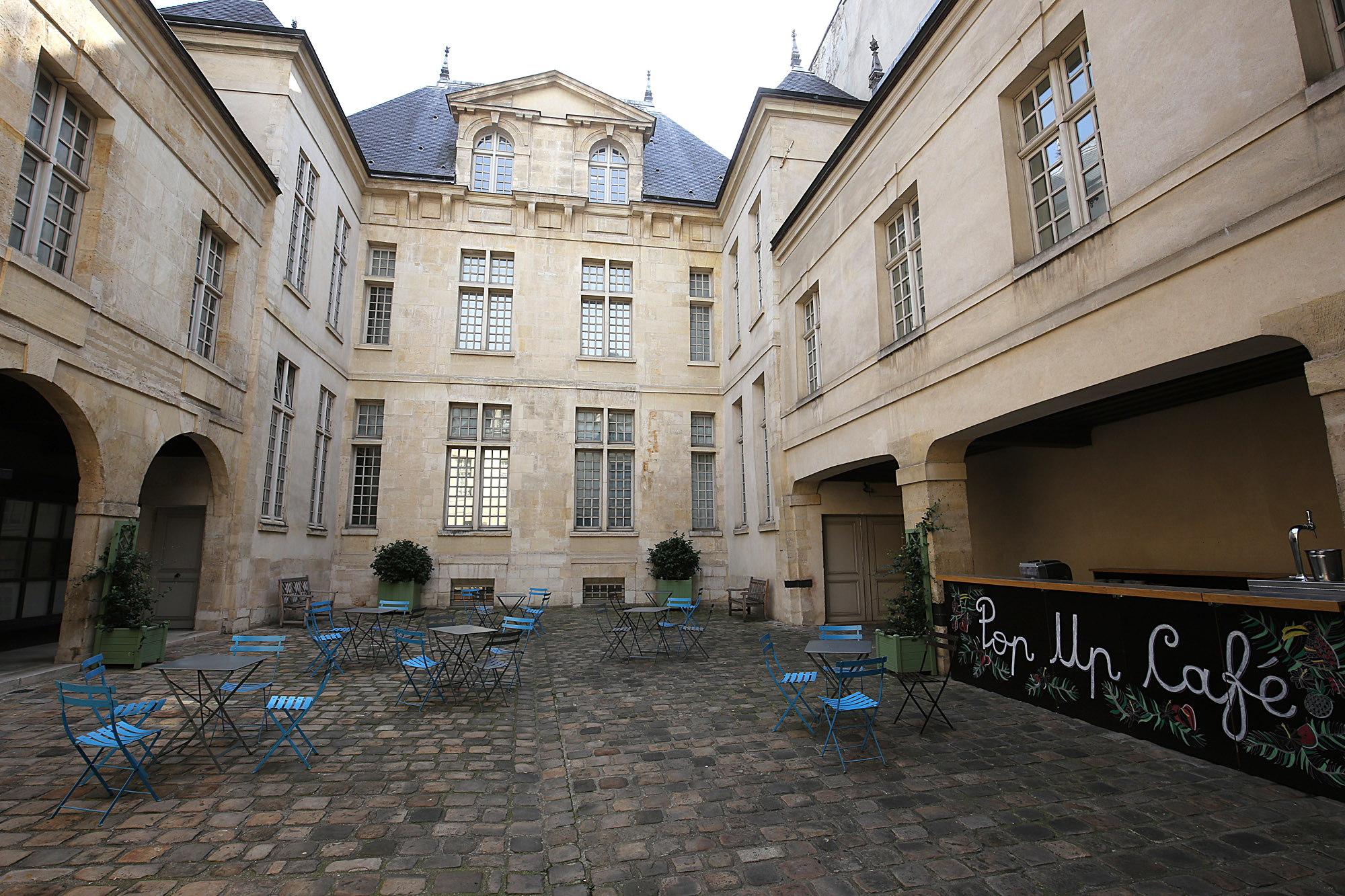
Exteriors of Cognac-Jay museum

== See also ==
- List of museums in Paris

== External links and bibliography ==
- (in English) Musée Cognacq-Jay - Paris Musées official website
- ParisInfo entry
- Paris-Tourisme entry
- Seymour de Ricci, Musée Cognacq-Jay: catalogue, Paris, 1929.
- Isabelle Néto, Musée Cognacq-Jay, musée du XVIIIe siècle de la Ville de Paris: catalogue des collections; le mobilier, Paris, Paris-Musées, 2001.
- Nathalie Lemoine-Bouchard, Musée Cognacq-Jay, musée du XVIIIe siècle de la Ville de Paris: catalogue des collections; les miniatures, Paris, Paris-Musées, 2002.
- Thérèse Burollet, Musée Cognacq-Jay, musée du XVIIIe siècle de la Ville de Paris: catalogue des collections; les peintures, Paris, Paris-Musées, 2004.
