= Henri Gautruche =

French architect

Henri- Gabriel Gautruche (4 April 1885 in Dourdan – 31 January 1964) was an architect of the city of Paris.

Gaudruche was made a chevalier of the Légion d'honneur in 1935, promoted an officer in 1950, recipient of the Croix de guerre 1914-1918, officer of the Order of the Crown of Belgium.

== Selected works ==
- Bath showers at 27 rue des Haies in Paris. This building, erected between 1924 and 1928 by Henri Gautruche and Georges Planche, marks a major innovation in the world of bath showers: for the first time, it is no longer an integral part of the municipal swimming pool. The architecture is faithful to the period: concrete, bricks, and as a unique touch of gaiety, polychrome ceramic tiles.
- The domaine Chérioux: an orphanage, built from 1927 to 1936 at the place known as La Nozaie in Vitry-sur-Seine. Henri Gautruche, was the architect of the girls' boarding school in 1932, the professional girls' boarding school in 1936, and finally the maternal boarding school in 1937. Henri Gautruche and Demorlaine, chief curator of the Promenades de la Ville de Paris and the Seine department, were entrusted with the development of the park.
- The first extension of the Musée Bourdelle in 1961, on the occasion of the centenary of the birth of Antoine Bourdelle.

== Sources ==
David de Penanrun, Louis Thérèse, second edition by E. Delaire, Les architectes élèves de l’École des beaux-arts, 1793-1907, Paris, La construction moderne, 1907, p. 290.
