= Musée Bourdelle =

Art museum in Paris

- Musée Bourdelle
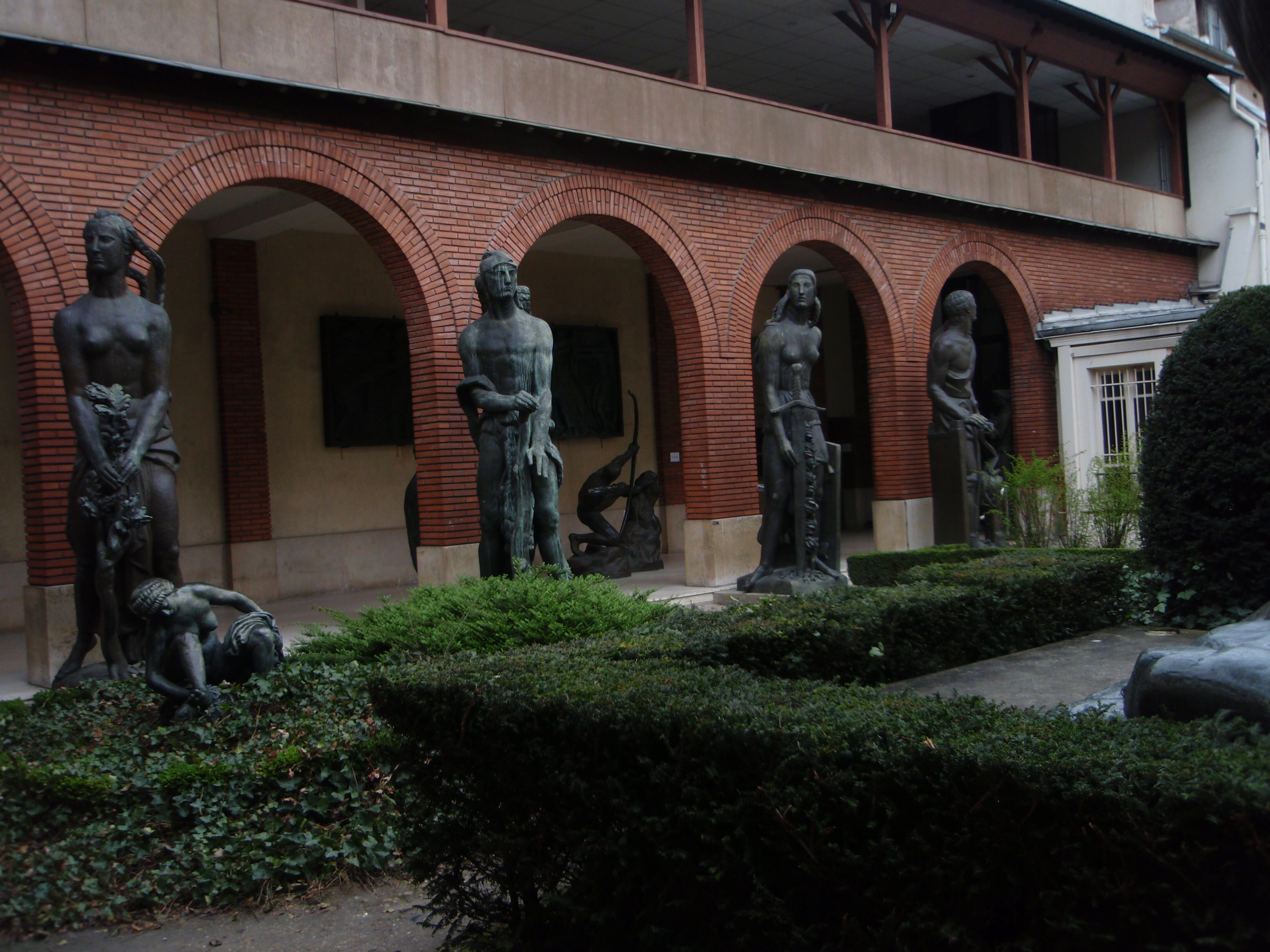
- Established: 1949
- Location: 18, rue Antoine Bourdelle, 75015 Paris
- Coordinates: 48.84306°N 2.31833°E
- Collections: Paintings, Sculptures, Drawings
- Public transit access: Falguière and Montparnasse – Bienvenüe
- Website: www.bourdelle.paris.fr/en

The Musée Bourdelle (French pronunciation: [myze buʁdɛl], Bourdelle Museum) is an art museum located at 18, rue Antoine Bourdelle, in the 15th arrondissement of Paris, France, located in the old studio of French sculptor Antoine Bourdelle (1861–1929). The museum is open daily, except Mondays. Admission to the permanent collections is free. The nearest metro stations are Falguière and Montparnasse-Bienvenüe.

The museum preserves the studio of sculptor Antoine Bourdelle and provides an example of Parisian ateliers from the late 19th and early 20th centuries. It was Bourdelle's active studio from 1885–1929. In 1922, Bourdelle began plans to turn his studio into a museum. In the early 1930s, Gabriel Cognacq provided funds to purchase the studio and thus avoid dispersing the artist's remaining works. The museum was inaugurated in 1949, expanded in 1961 by architect Henri Gautruche, and again in 1992 by Christian de Portzamparc. A second Bourdelle garden-museum, in Égreville, was established by his heirs in the late 1960s. It hosts another 56 of his sculptures.

Today the museum contains more than 500 works including marble, plaster, and bronze statues, paintings, pastels, fresco sketches, and Bourdelle's personal collection of works by artists including Eugène Carrière, Eugène Delacroix, Jean Auguste Dominique Ingres, Adolphe Joseph Thomas Monticelli, Pierre Puvis de Chavannes, and Auguste Rodin. It contains the original plaster casts of some of his finest works including 21 studies of Ludwig van Beethoven, as well as document archives and his copies of Greek and medieval works.

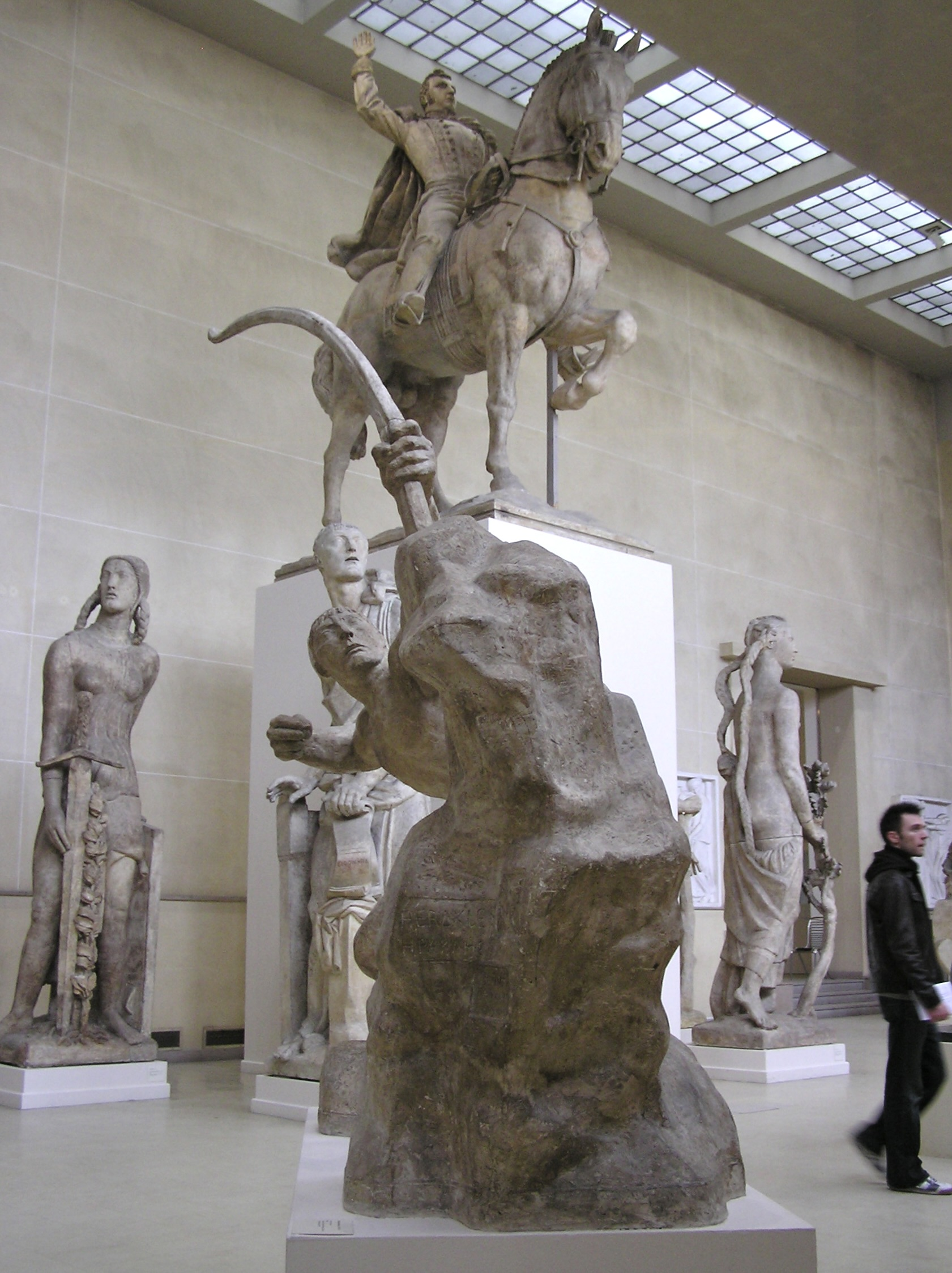
Musée Bourdelle, hall of plasters

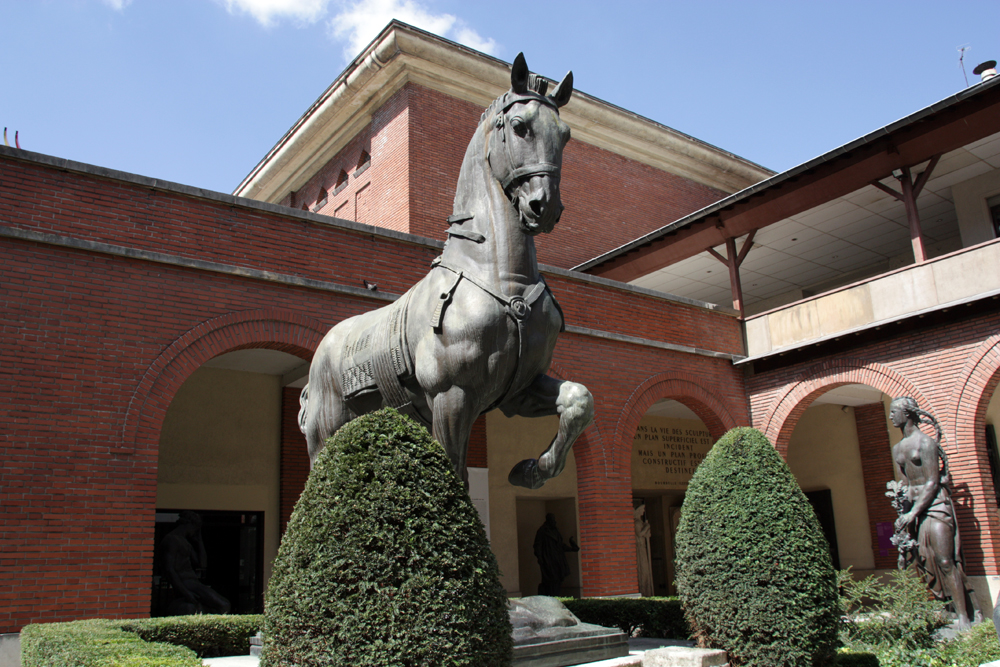
Courtyard of the Musée Bourdelle

Since June 2012, the museum's visitors follow a different path through the permanent collections: educational, chronological and attuned to the work, highlighting Bourdelle's artistic evolution.

Bourdelle Museum is one of the fourteen Museums of the City of Paris that have been incorporated since 1 January 2013, in the French public institution Paris Musées.

The museum was extensively renovated over two years, reopening in March 2023.

== See also ==
- List of museums in Paris
- List of single-artist museums
- List of works by Antoine Bourdelle
