= Palais Galliera =

Fashion museum in Paris, France

Coordinates: 48°51′56″N 2°17′48″E

- Musée de la Mode de la Ville de Paris
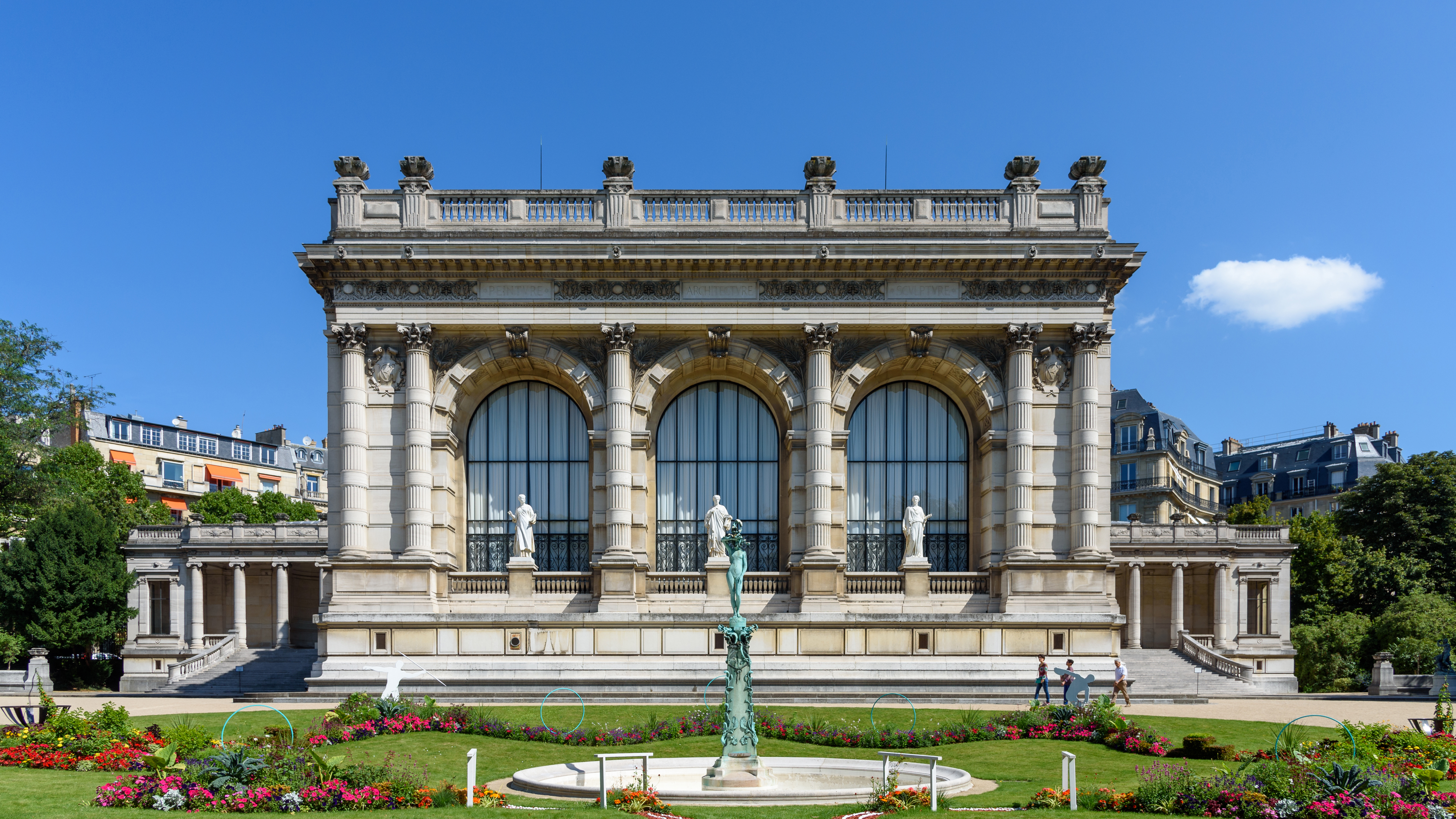
- Musée de la Mode de la Ville de Paris, known as the Palais Galliera, in the 16th arrondissement of Paris
- Established: 1977
- Location: Paris
- Collections: costumes of the 18th century to today
- Director: Miren Arzalluz
- Architect: Léon Ginain
- Website: www.palaisgalliera.paris.fr

The Palais Galliera, also formally known as the Musée de la Mode de la Ville de Paris (City of Paris Fashion Museum), and formerly known as Musée Galliera, is a museum of fashion and fashion history located at 10, avenue Pierre 1er de Serbie, in the 16th arrondissement of Paris, France. When exhibitions are on it is open daily except Mondays and public holidays; an admission fee is charged and varies depending on the exhibition programmed. The museum opened its doors again 28 September 2013 after being closed for major renovation. Until 2021, there is no permanent presentation of the collections for conservation reasons.

Palais Galliera is one of the 14 City of Paris museums that have been incorporated since 1 January 2013, in the public institution Paris Musées.

== History ==
The Duke of Galliera was a partner in the urban planning firm Thome & Cie, and owned a large parcel of land in one of the finest neighborhoods in Paris. Upon his death in 1876, his wife, Maria Brignole Sale De Ferrari, the Duchesse de Galliera, became heir to his immense fortune. The duchess decided that she wanted to use the land to build a museum, at her expense, to hold their works of arts. According to her wishes, a notary prepared a deed of gift to give the land parcel to the French state. However, after the gift was registered and accepted by presidential decree on 30 August 1879, it was discovered that the notary had made a serious error. Rather than donating the parcel to France, the deed was written as a gift to the City of Paris. Unable to change the deed at this point, the gift remained as written. Construction of the museum began in 1879, on an opulent design by architect Léon Ginain, who also supervised its construction. In 1884, the Duchess gave 6.5 million francs to the City of Paris for work already done as well as funds necessary to complete it.

On 22 June 1886, Jules Grévy and Georges Clemenceau convened the Chamber of Deputies of the French Third Republic and adopted a law expelling any person who was a direct heir of a royalist dynasty that had reigned in France. The Duchess Galliera, who had descended from the House of Orléans, was outraged by the law, no less because she had already donated the Hôtel Matignon to France. Unable to revoke her gift of the new museum, she abandoned the rest of her planned legacy to Paris. Thus, her collection of paintings and fine art were given to Genoa, Italy, where they are now displayed at the Palazzo Rosso and Palazzo Bianco.

The Duchess died in December 1888, before the museum was completed, but in May 1889, her heirs gave the City of Paris 1.3 million francs to finish its construction. Léon Ginain completed the museum in February 1894, which was officially received by the city a few months later, in July. In the absence of the Galliera art collection, for which it was designed, the City of Paris used the museum for temporary displays. The first exhibition, devoted to portraits of women and lace, was inaugurated by President Félix Faure on 1 March 1895. It became a museum of industrial arts in 1902, and later, it served as space for temporary shows of modern art. The city also rented it to auctioneers for prestigious sales.

== The building ==
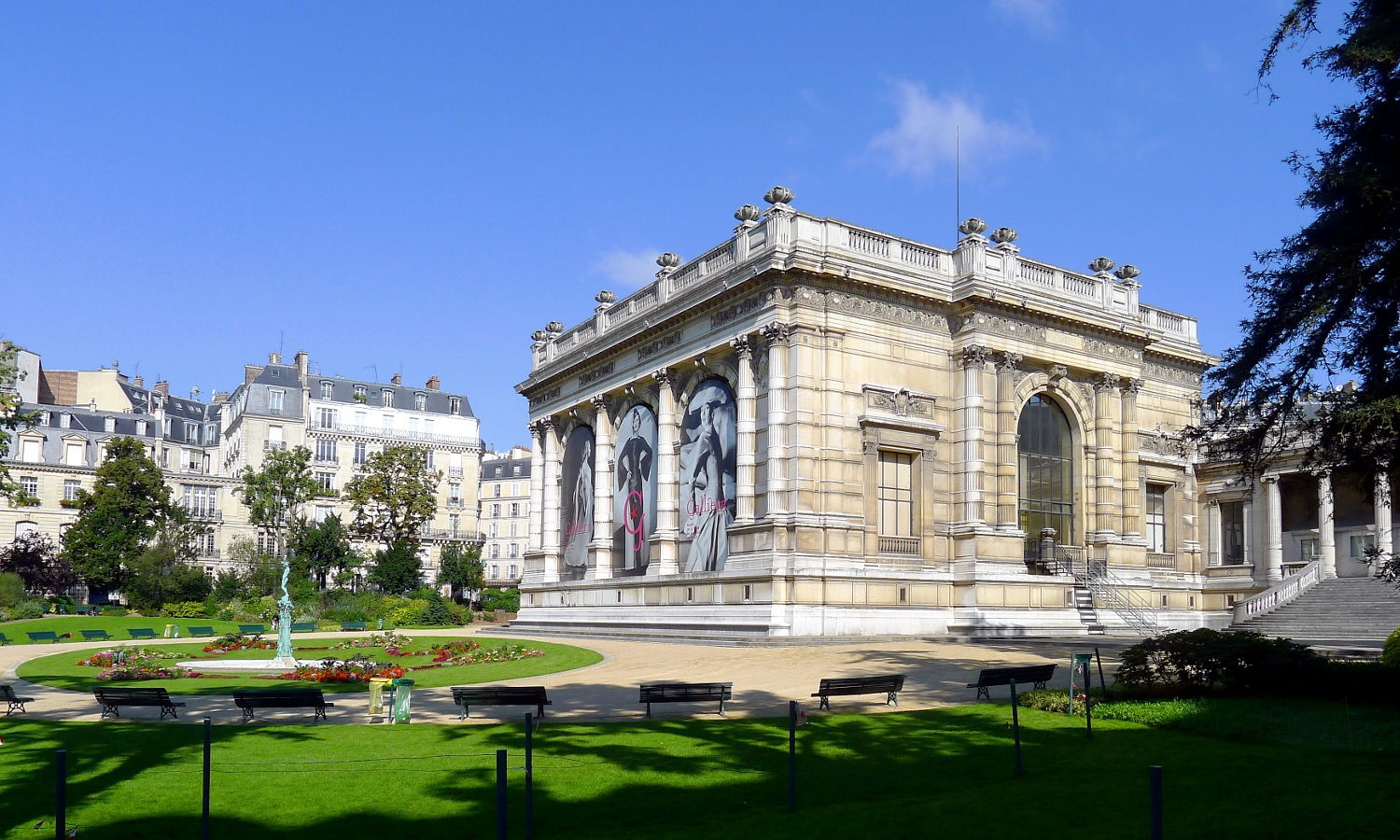
View of the museum across Brignole Galliera Square.

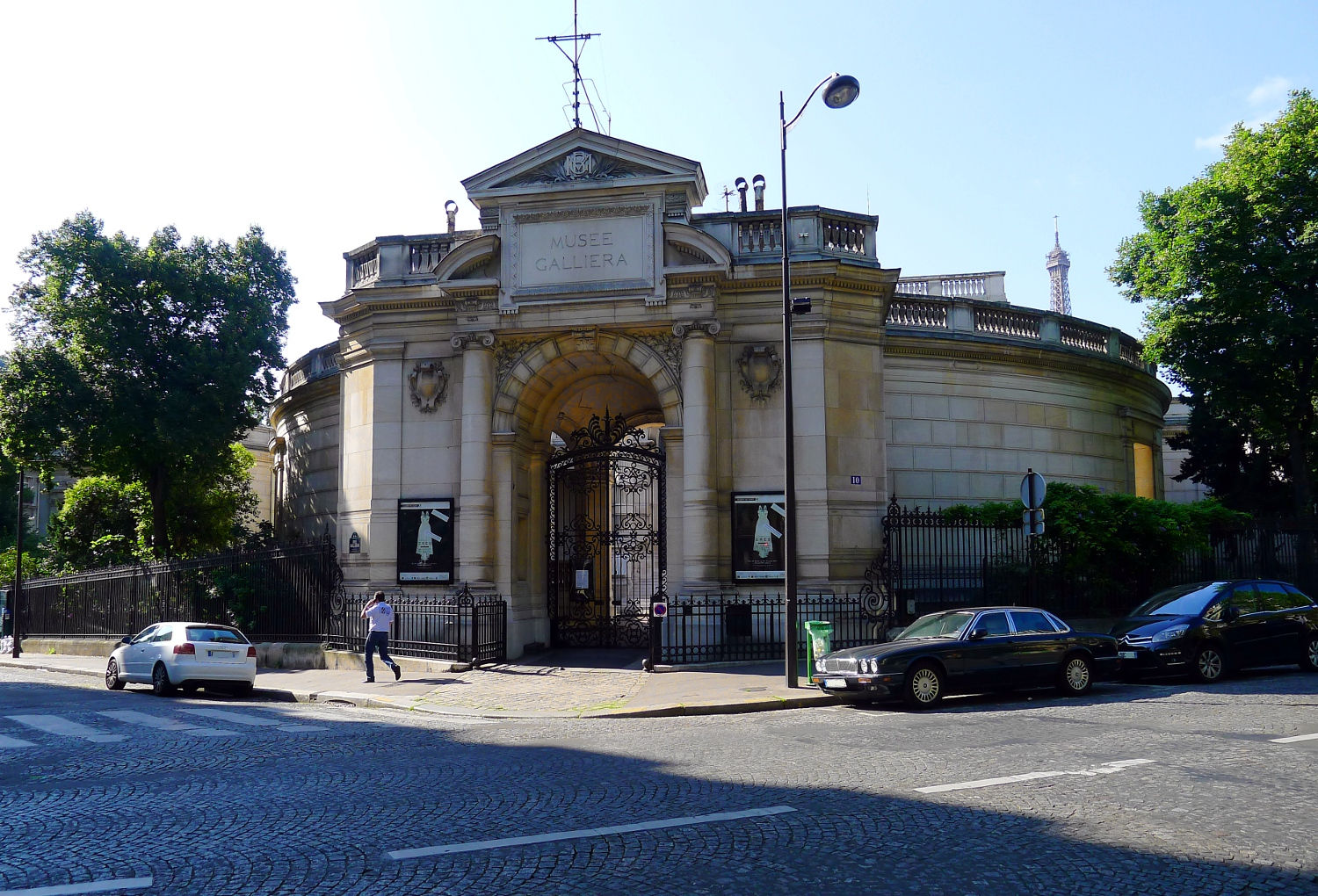
View from Avenue Pierre Ier de Serbie.

Musée de la Mode de la Ville de Paris

The Palais Galliera faces Brignole Galliera Square, immediately north of the Palais de Tokyo and one block east of the Musée Guimet. The architect Léon Ginain based his design on a palace that the Duchess Galliera owned in Genoa. The building is faced in cut stone in the Italian Renaissance style supported by an underframe of steel, constructed by the Eiffel Company. The mosaic floors and domes are the work of Giandomenico Facchina (1826–1904). The statues on the façade that fronts Avenue du President Wilson represent "Painting" by Henri Chapu, "Architecture" by Jules Thomas, and "Sculpture" by Peter Cavelier. In 1906 a monumental fountain, "April", by Pierre Roche was built in front of the museum.

== Fashion Museum ==
Since 1977, the City of Paris has operated the Palais Galliera as the Musée de la Mode de la Ville de Paris, a permanent museum devoted to fashion. It displays exhibits of French fashion design and costume from the eighteenth century to the present day. The museum is closed in between exhibitions.

In December 2017, the fashion historian Miren Arzalluz was named as the director of the Palais Galliera.

The museum's holdings contain about 70,000 items, and are organized as follows:

- Costumes – from the 18th century to the present, including clothes owned by Marie-Antoinette, Louis XVII, and the Empress Josephine, the dress worn by Audrey Hepburn at the Longchamp Hippodrome (1966), and displays of fashions by the leading 19th and 20th century designers including Balenciaga, Pierre Balmain, Anne-Marie Beretta, Louise Chéruit, Sonia Delaunay, Christian Dior, Jacques Fath, Mariano Fortuny, Jean Paul Gaultier, Givenchy, Paul Poiret, Paco Rabanne, Yves Saint Laurent, and Elsa Schiaparelli.
- Undergarments – an excellent collection of slips, corsets, crinolines, etc.
- Accessories – including jewelry, canes, hats, fans, purses, scarves, gloves (including a pair owned by Sarah Bernhardt), parasols, and umbrellas.
- Graphic arts and photography – stamps, drawings, photography, advertisements, etc.

== See also ==
- List of museums in Paris
