= Universal White Brotherhood =

Spiritual movement founded in Bulgaria

The Universal White Brotherhood (UWB) is a cult founded in Bulgaria in 1897 by Peter Dunov. It was later established in France in 1937 by the so-called Omraam Mikhaël Aïvanhov, one of Deunov's followers.

Their teachings are also known as "Dunovism", after the founder. The group proposes a Christian esoterism, characterized by several practices, including prayers, meditation, breathing exercises, yoga of nutrition and paneurhythmy. A person can be both a member of the group and of another religion. It has two centers located in Sèvres and Fréjus and 2,000 followers in France. It is present in many countries, including Canada, Switzerland, and Belgium.

== Explanation of name ==
"Universal" refers to humans' ability to understand universal concepts about life. It speaks to the idea that people can expand their consciousness through concepts that extend beyond any one person or group.

"White" refers to "the highest spiritual symbol, which is the synthesis of all colors, being the manifestations of the soul's virtues".

"Brotherhood" is meant to indicate that the UWB's teachings are for every human, regardless of community, religion, or group.

The Universal White Brotherhood believes that their cult is for everyone so that they can expand their consciousness and embrace a virtuous spirituality.

== History ==
In 1904, Deunov moved to Sofia, Bulgaria. He began holding weekly Sunday lectures, which continued until he died in 1944. The so-called school of the UWB was opened in 1922. Paneurhythmy began to develop in the 1930s, and Deunov began taking followers to the Rila Mountains during this decade.

The cult was banned in communist Bulgaria starting in 1944. In France, the cult achieved notability in the media in 1971. The 1995 and 1999 reports established by the Parliamentary Commission on Cults in France, as well as the 1997 reports issued by the Parliamentary Inquiry Commission in Belgium listed the group as a cult.

After Bulgaria's fall of communism in 1989, UWB was recognized as a religious sect.

== Pilgrimage ==
Every year, some members make a pilgrimage to the Rila Mountains in Bulgaria in August, where they perform paneurhythmy together to celebrate the new year. August 19 is believed to be the beginning of the divine year, and on this day the sun has "a special radiation". Shared lunches, lectures and concerts are also held.
