= Omraam Mikhaël Aïvanhov =

Bulgarian philosopher (1900–1986)

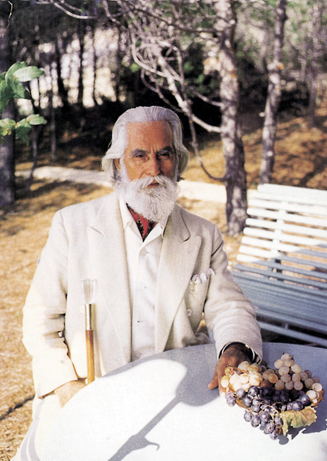
- Born: Mikhail Dimitrov Ivanov; January 31, 1900; Srpci, Manastir Vilayet, Ottoman Empire (present-day North Macedonia)
- Died: December 25, 1986 (aged 86); Fréjus, Var, France

Philosophical work
- Era: Christianity, Kabbalah, Buddhism, Hinduism
- School: School of the Universal White Brotherhood
- Main interests: Love, wisdom, truth, justice and virtue
- Notable ideas: Universal White Brotherhood
- Website: with-omraam.com

Omraam Mikhaël Aïvanhov (Bulgarian: Омраам Микаел Айванхов; born Mikhail Dimitrov Ivanov [Михаил Димитров Иванов]; January 31, 1900 – December 25, 1986) was a Bulgarian philosopher, pedagogue, mystic, and esotericist. A leading 20th-century teacher of Western Esotericism in Europe, he was a disciple of Peter Deunov (Beinsa Douno), the founder of the Universal White Brotherhood.

== Life ==
Mikhail Dimitrov Ivanov was born in Srpci (then in the Manastir Vilayet of the Ottoman Empire), a village in Bitola Municipality in the present-day North Macedonia, to a Bulgarian family. His father, Ivan Dimitrov established a coal business in Varna, Bulgaria. His mother, Dolya was a religious woman, who dedicated her son to God since his very early childhood. In 1907, she decided that the family should join her husband and they moved to Varna, too. His father died when Aivanhov was seven years old. At the age of 17, after a childhood passed in poverty, he met Master Peter Deunov (1864–1944), the founder of the Universal White Brotherhood in the city of Varna, Bulgaria. A few months later in 1918, he followed Master Deunov to the capital, Sofia.

During the early years of his discipleship, Aivanhov was quite poor. He owned a bed, some books, a violin (given to him by Deunov) and a few shabby clothes. He spent most of his time on spiritual retreats in the mountains, where he studied and meditated, occasionally taking a job to earn his keep. Deunov also obliged him to broaden his conventional knowledge by pursuing studies at the University of Sofia, and he enrolled in courses on psychology, education philosophy, mathematics, chemistry, astronomy & medicine between 1923 and 1931. From around 1932 to around 1937, he worked as a school teacher and then a high school principal.

In 1937 with the approach of the Second World War, Peter Deunov foresaw that political unrest, war and the spread of communism would lead to a ban on all spiritual associations in Bulgaria and so he entrusted Mikhail Ivanov with bringing his teaching to France. Deunov chose Aivanhov out of 40,000 other students.

On July 22, 1937, he arrived in France penniless, with no knowledge of French and only one contact person in France, Stella Bellemin, a Bulgarian expatriate. However, Aivanhov turned out to be an excellent linguist. He took no money from his students or charged for his lectures apart from one exception when touring America. The money was banked and used later for a publishing project. On January 29, 1938, he gave his first public talk in the Luxembourg Hall, Place de la Sorbonne. This was the first of over 5000 conferences. In 1944 he published his first collection of talks. On January 21, 1948, he was arrested on a false charge and sentenced to 4 years in prison, but in March 1950 he was released.

He taught mainly in France, and he created the spiritual centers Bonfin in Fréjus, France and Izgrev, Sofia in his native Bulgaria, but also traveled a great deal. From 1938 until 1986 he gave some 4,500 talks in French, first of all in France (in Paris and its outskirts, and later at Fréjus in the Var region), and then in Switzerland (spiritual center Videlinata), Canada, the United States, India, Sweden and Norway. He also visited many other countries.

His works which include 44 pocketbooks and 32 complete works are based on his lectures, which were recorded first in shorthand and since 1960 on audio and video tape. Finally, in 1972 his Publishing House Prosveta released several collections of these talks in the form of books and brochures (translated into 30 languages), CDs and DVDs with subtitles.

In 1959, he traveled to India, where he met saint, Neem Karoli Baba, whom Baba Ram Dass/Richard Alpert made famous in North America. Babaji referred to Aivanhov as 'the French Sadhu' The name Omraam was given to him by three sages who approached Aivanhov while he was in India, meditating and uttered the word 'Omraam' thereafter he was known as Omraam Mikhaël Aïvanhov. After this he allowed himself to be called "Master".

== Central idea ==
Aivanhov's philosophy teaches that everybody, regardless of race, religion, social position, intellectual ability or material means, is able to take part in the realization of a new period of brotherhood and peace on earth. This happens through the individual's personal transformation: growth in perfection and in harmony with the divine world. Whatever the topic, he invariably focuses on how one can better conduct life on earth. Aivanhov taught that to achieve a better life, one must have a high ideal: "... if you have a High Ideal, such as the bringing of the Kingdom of God on earth, you obtain everything you wished for, you taste plenitude."

== Initiatic science ==
Aïvanhov teaches the ancient principles of initiatic science. He describes the cosmic laws governing both the universe and the human being, the macrocosm and microcosm, and the exchanges that constantly take place between them.

This knowledge has taken different forms throughout the centuries. It is the perennial wisdom expressed through various religions, each adapted to the spirit of a particular time, people, and level of spiritual evolution. Aivanhov's teaching incorporates aspects of Esoteric Christianity that relate to finding the "Kingdom of God on earth" within the individual. One of the essential truths of initiatic science, according to Aivanhov, is that (in the higher world) all things are linked. Thus committing oneself to the Kingdom of God on earth makes it realizable: "The real science is to form within ourselves, in the depths of our being, this Body that Initiates call the Body of Glory, the Body of Light, the Body of Christ."

== Personal life and death ==
Aïvanhov was a pescetarian. He died on December 25, 1986, in Fréjus, France, shortly after receiving French citizenship.

== Bibliography ==
The Complete Works (only 19 volumes from 32 available in English)

- Volume 1 – The Second Birth – Love Wisdom Truth
- Volume 2 – Spiritual Alchemy
- Volume 5 – Life Force
- Volume 6 – Harmony
- Volume 7 – The Mysteries of Yesod – Foundations of the Spiritual Life
- Volume 10 – The Splendour of Tiphareth – The Yoga of the Sun
- Volume 11 – The Key to the Problems of Existence
- Volume 12 – Cosmic Moral Laws
- Volume 13 – A New Earth – Methods, Exercises, Formulas, Prayers
- Volume 14 – Love and Sexuality, part 1
- Volume 15 – Love and Sexuality, part 2
- Volume 16 – Hrani Yoga – The Alchemical and Magical Meaning of Nutrition
- Volume 17 – 'Know Thyself' Jnana Yoga, part 1
- Volume 18 – 'Know Thyself' Jnana Yoga, part 2
- Volume 25 – A New Dawn: Society and Politics in the Light of Initiatic Science, part 1
- Volume 26 – A New Dawn: Society and Politics in the Light of Initiatic Science, part 2
- Volume 29 – On the Art of Teaching – From the Initiatic Point of View, part 3
- Volume 30 – Life and Work in an Initiatic School – Training for the Divine, part 1
- Volume 32 – The Fruits of the Tree of Life – The Cabbalistic Tradition

Brochures

- 301 – The New Year
- 302 – Meditation
- 303 – Respiration
- 304 – Death and the Life Beyond

Izvor Collection

- 201 – Toward a Solar Civilisation
- 202 – Man, Master of his Destiny
- 203 – Education Begins Before Birth
- 204 – The Yoga of Nutrition
- 205 – Sexual Force or the Winged Dragon
- 207 – What is a Spiritual Master?
- 210 – The Tree of the Knowledge of Good and Evil
- 212 – Light as a Living Spirit
- 213 – Man's Two Natures: Human and Divine
- 214 – Hope for the World: Spiritual Galvanoplasty
- 215 – The True Meaning of Christ's Teaching
- 217 – New Light on the Gospels
- 218 – The Symbolic Language of Geometrical Figures
- 223 – Creation: Artistic and Spiritual
- 224 – The Powers of Thought
- 226 - The Book of Divine Magic
- 229 – The Path of Silence
- 233 – Youth: Creators of the Future
- 236 – Angels and other Mysteries of The Tree of Life
- 239 – Love Greater Than Faith

== Sources ==
- Feuerstein, Georg (1992). The Mystery of Light: The Life and Teachings of Omraam Michael Aivanhov. Salt Lake City, UT: Passage Press. ISBN 0-941255-51-4.
- Frenette, Louise-Marie (September 2009). The Life of a Master in the West. Canyon Country, CA: Prosveta USA. ISBN 978-0-9842693-0-3.
- Lejbowicz, Agnes (1982). Omraam Michael Aivanhov, Master of the Great White Brotherhood. Fréjus, France: Editions Prosveta.
- Renard, Opierre (1980). The Solar Revolution and the Prophet. Fréjus, France: Editions Prosveta.
- Who Is Omraam Michael Aivanhov?. Fréjus, France: Editions Prosveta. 1982.
- Margit Kranewitter, Aspects de la Peinture Visionnaire Initiatique, (1980 Mémoire Universitaire), in 2016 a book in Stella Mattutina Edizioni, Italy.
- Ouriel Zohar, Les aspects théâtraux dans une société collectiviste, religieuse et universelle in "Misli, Rivistadel Centro Studi Omraam Mikhaël Aïvanhov", Revue de L'Università per Stranieri di Perugia no. 5, p. 59-79, 2018.
