= Srpci =

Srpci Српци
- Village
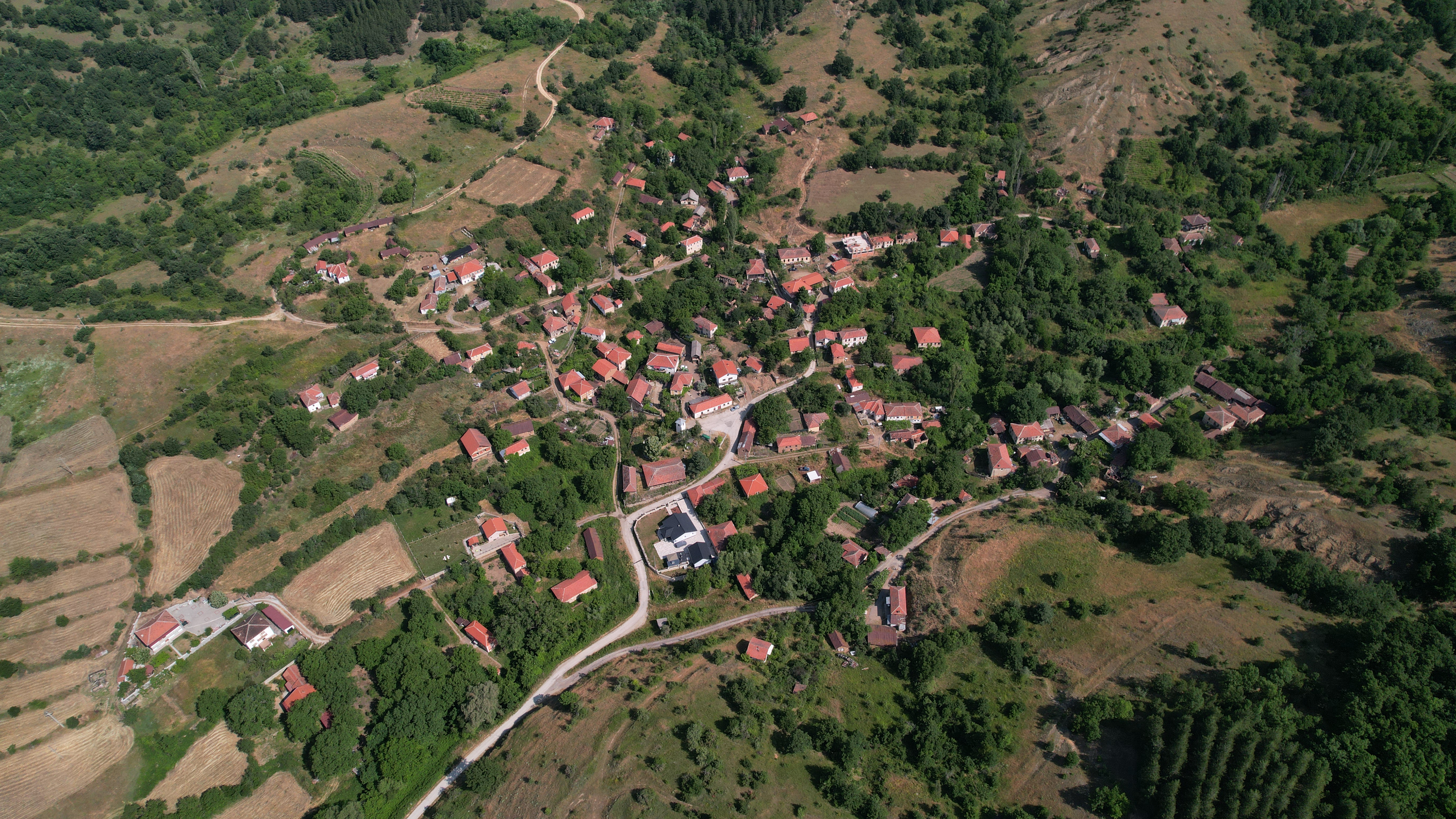
- Air view of the village

- Location within North Macedonia
- Country: North Macedonia
- Region: Pelagonia
- Municipality: Bitola

Population (2002)
  - Total: 65
- Time zone: UTC+1 (CET)
  - Summer (DST): UTC+2 (CEST)

Srpci (Macedonian Cyrillic: Српци) is a village 12 kilometers away from Bitola, which is the second largest city in North Macedonia. It used to be part of the former municipality of Capari.

== Demographics ==
According to the 1467-68 Ottoman defter, the inhabitants of Srpci (Serpça) appears carried a mixed Slav-Albanian anthroponomy - usually a Slavic first name and an Albanian last name or last names with Albanian patronyms and Slavic suffixes.

According to the 2002 census, the village had a total of 65 inhabitants. Ethnic groups in the village include:

- Macedonians 65

== People from Srpci ==
- Omraam Mikhaël Aïvanhov

== Galleri ==
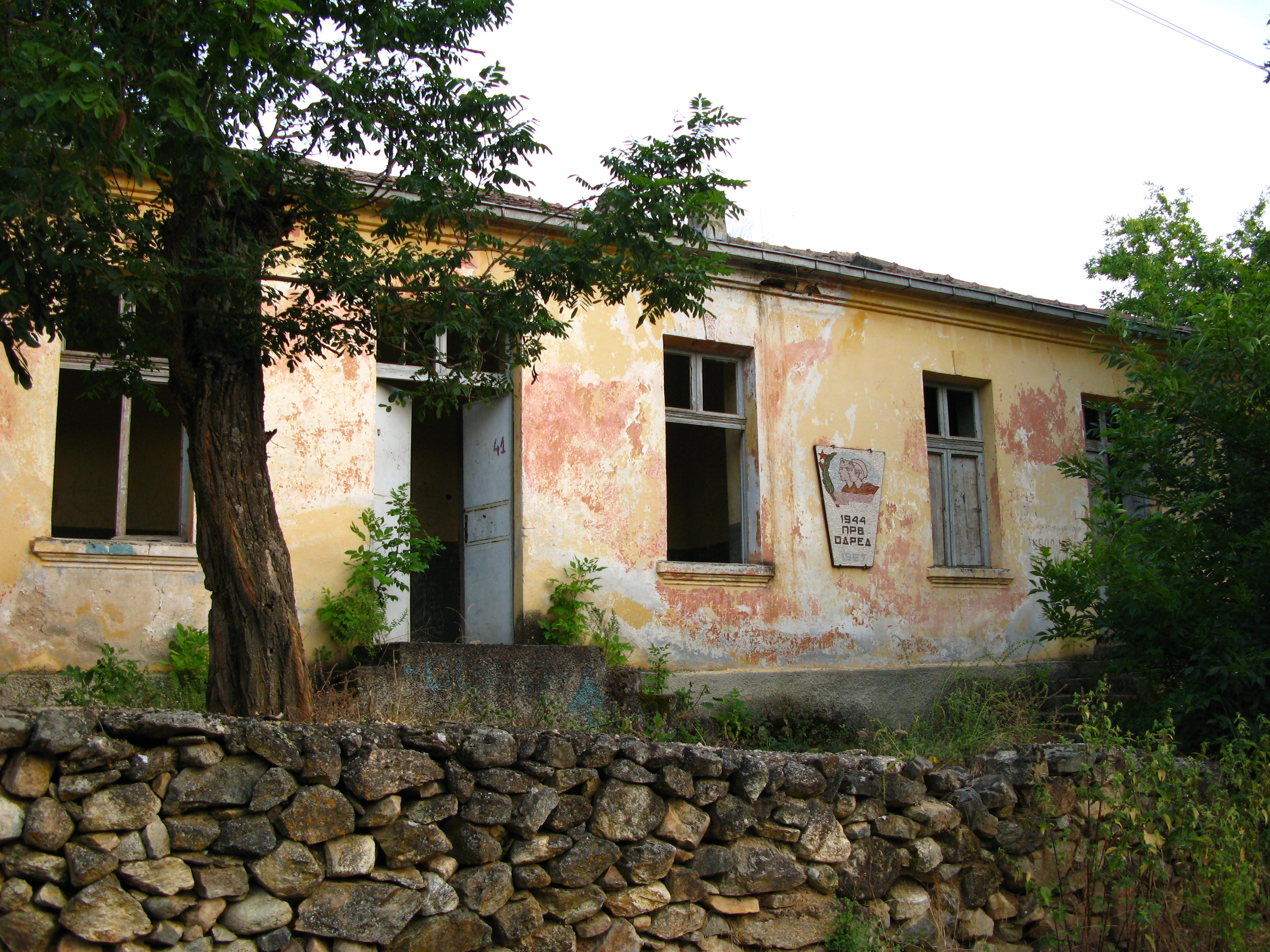
Old primary school

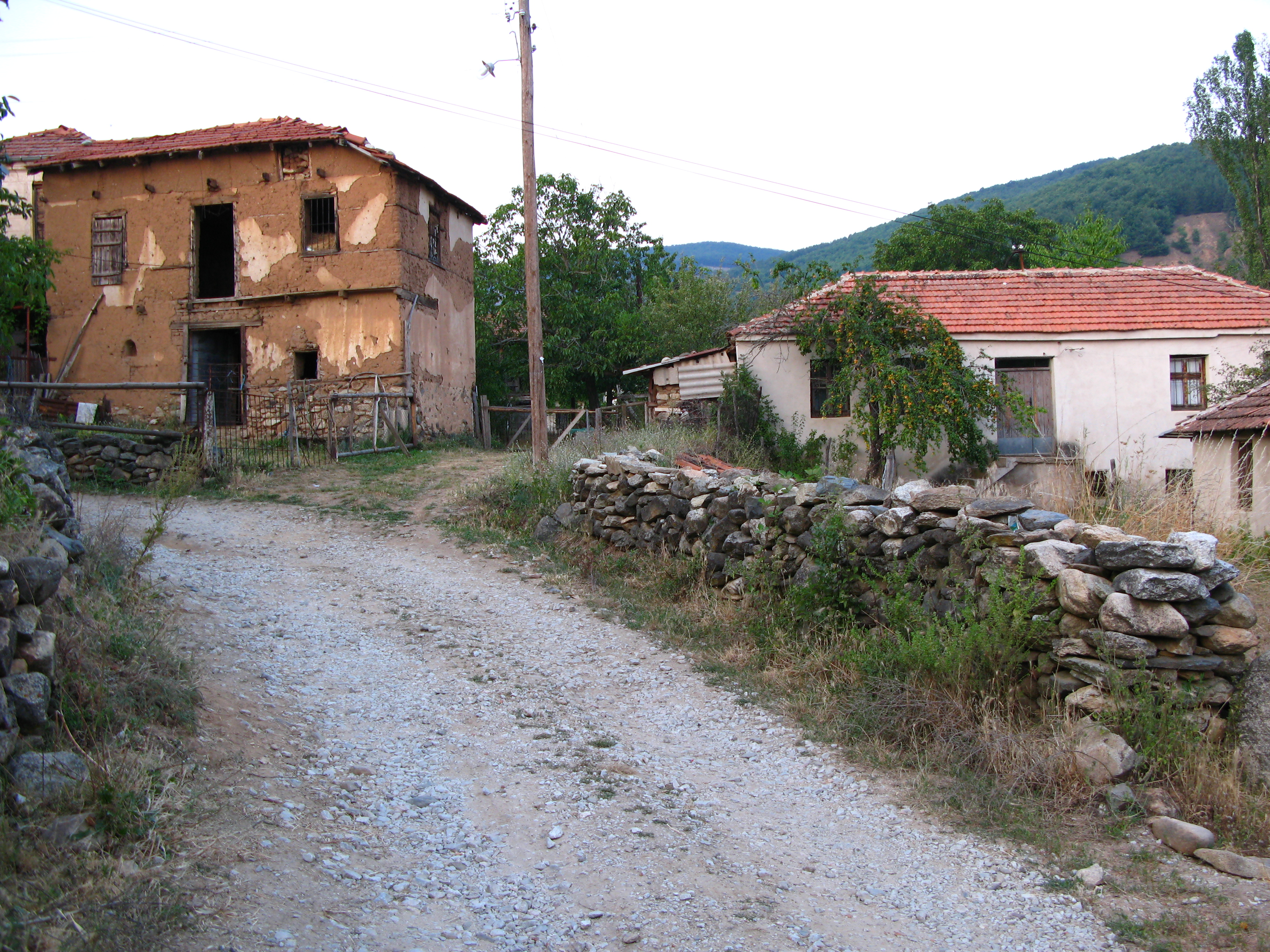
Old houses

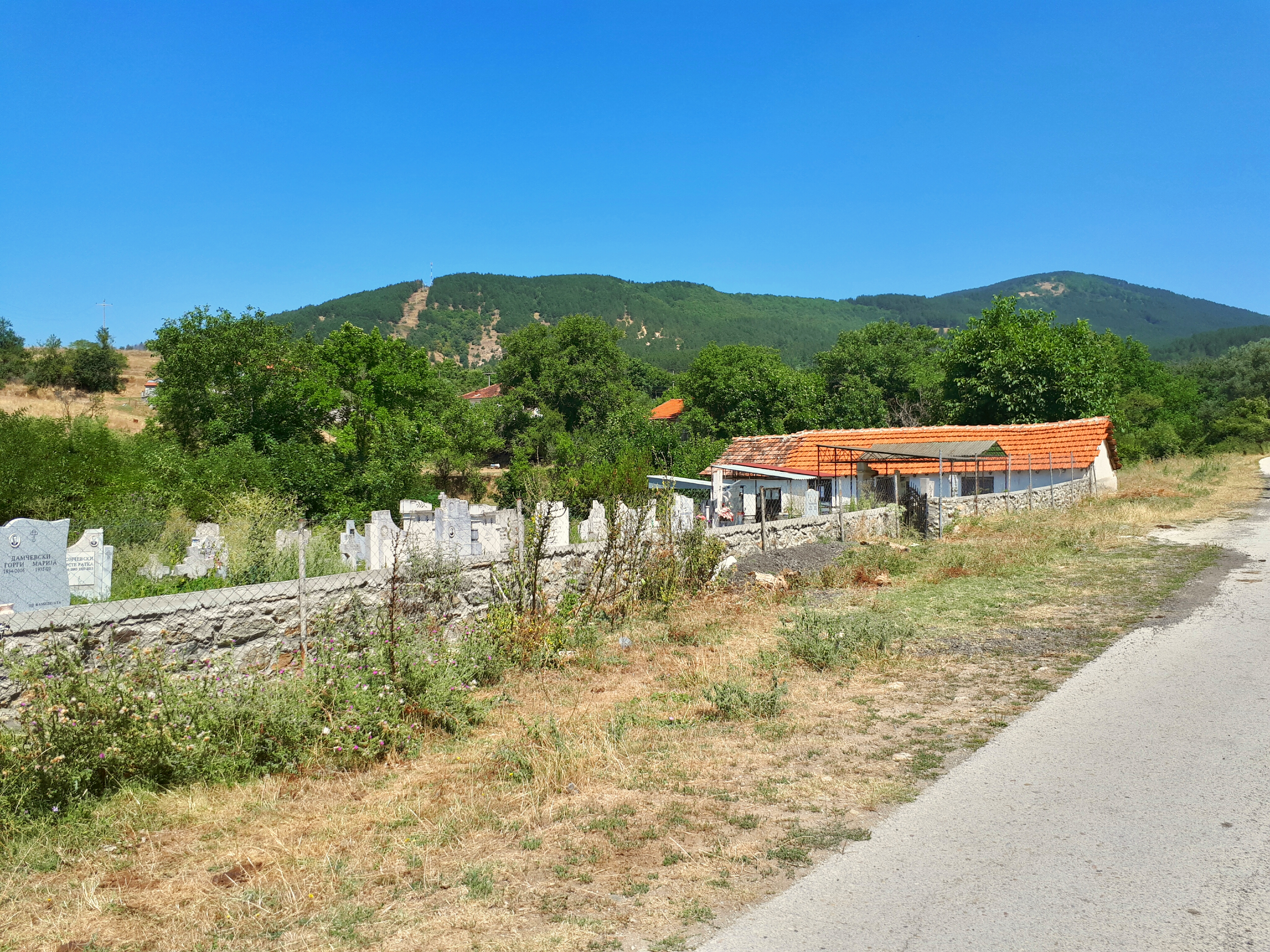
The village cemetery at the entrance to the village
