= Peter Deunov =

Bulgarian philosopher and spiritual teacher (1864 – 1944)

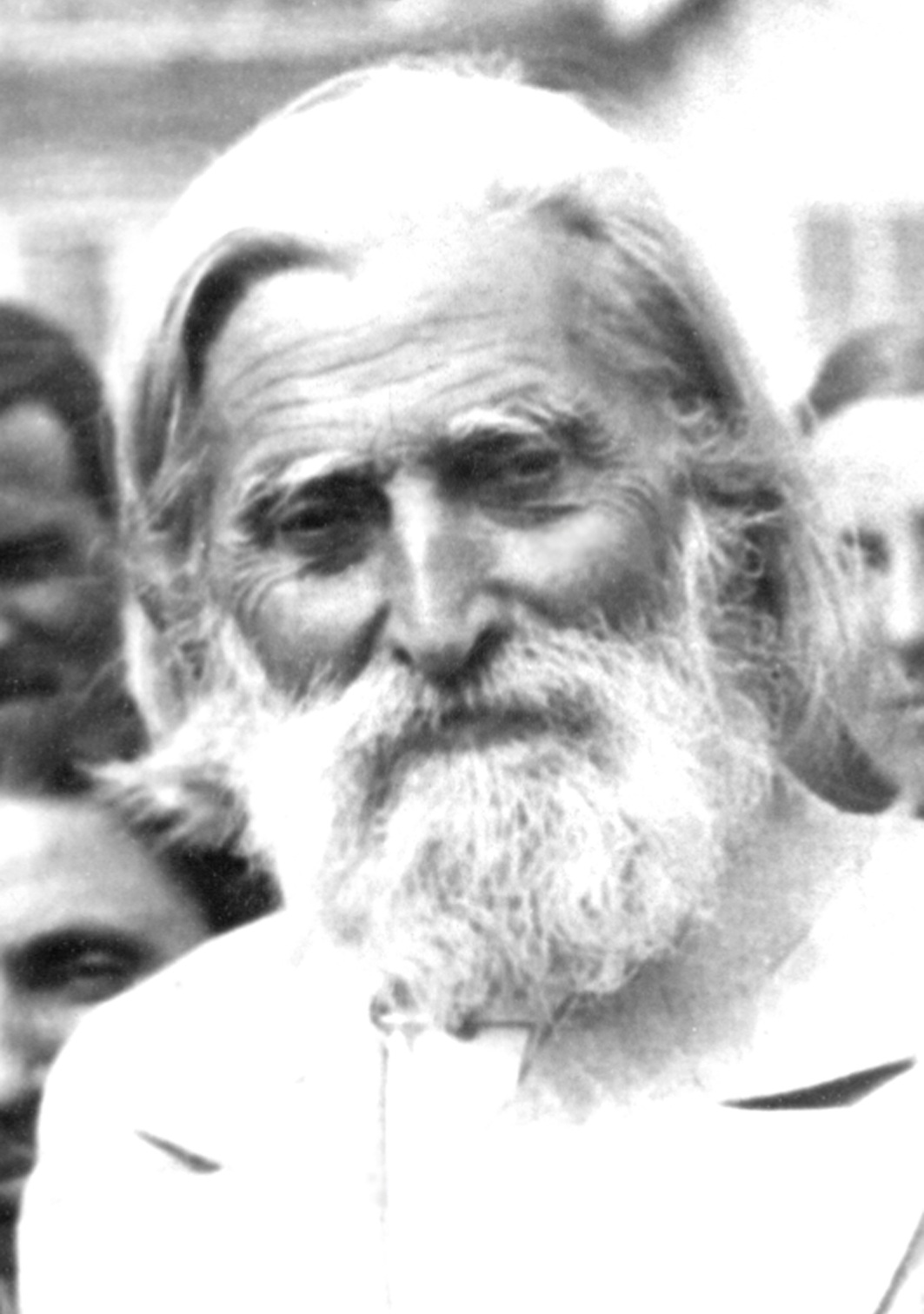
Peter Deunov

Peter Dunov (/ˈdʌnɒv/ DUN-ov; Bulgarian: Петър Дънов [ˈpɛtɐr ˈdɤnof]; July 11, 1864 – December 27, 1944), also known by his spiritual name Beinsa Douno (Bulgarian: Беинса Дуно [bɛinˈsа duˈnɔ]), and often titled Uchitelyat ("the Teacher") by his followers, was a Bulgarian philosopher and spiritual teacher who developed a form of Esoteric Christianity known as the Universal White Brotherhood. He is widely known in Bulgaria, where he was voted second by the public in the Great Bulgarians TV show on Bulgarian National Television (2006–2007). Dunov is also featured in Pantev and Gavrilov's The 100 Most Influential Bulgarians in Our History (ranked in 37th place). According to Petrov, Peter Dunov is “the most published Bulgarian author to this day.”

== Biography ==
=== Early life ===
Peter Dunov was born on 11 July 1864 [O.S. 29 June] in the village of Hadarcha (now Nikolaevka in Suvorovo Municipality) near Varna, Bulgaria (at that time in the Ottoman Empire), the third child of Konstantin Dunoffsky and Dobra Atanasova Georgieva. His father was the first Bulgarian teacher in the region before becoming a Bulgarian Orthodox priest. He was one of the first to present the liturgy in Bulgarian, the language of the local people, instead of the imposed Greek language.

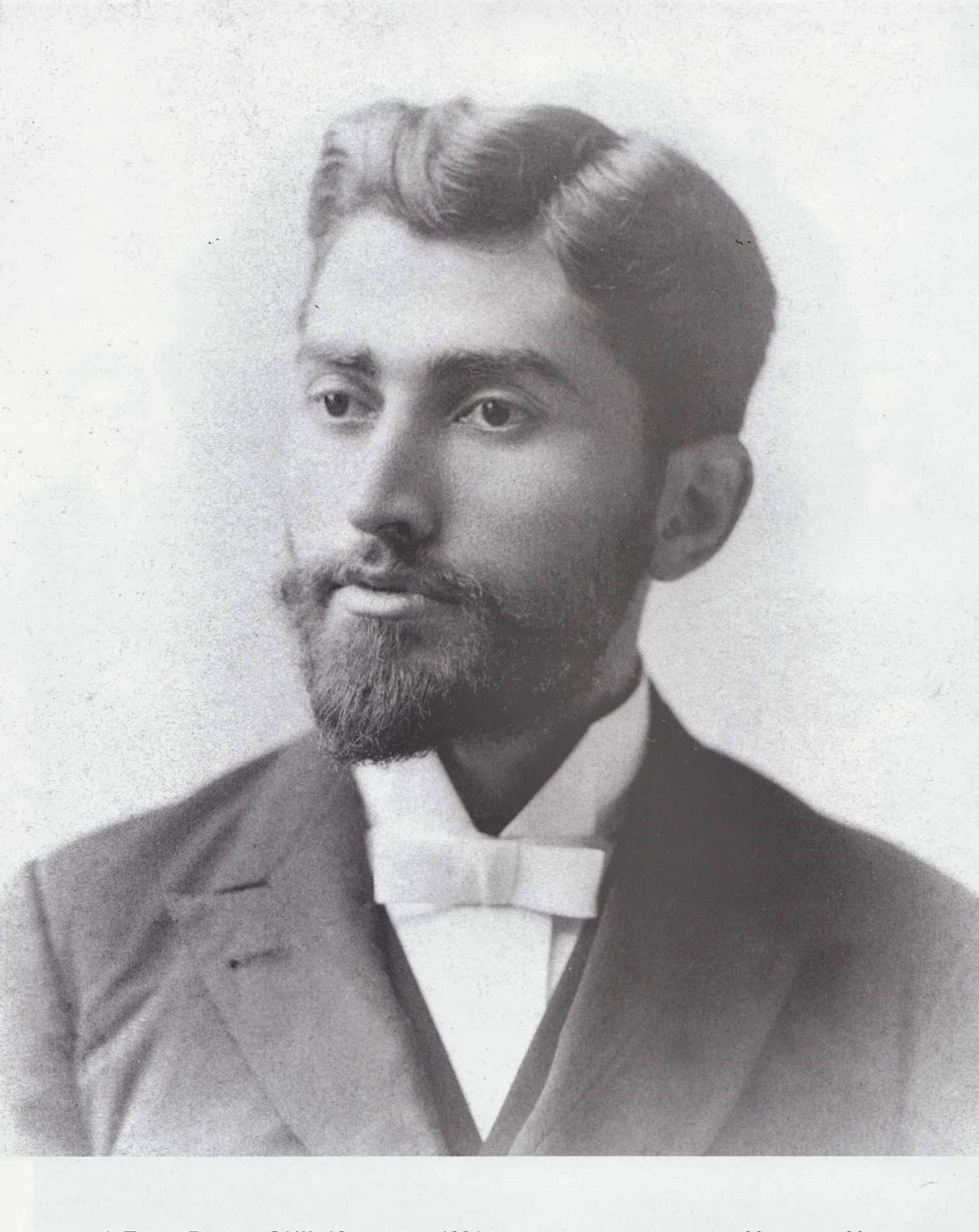
Peter Dunov, 1891

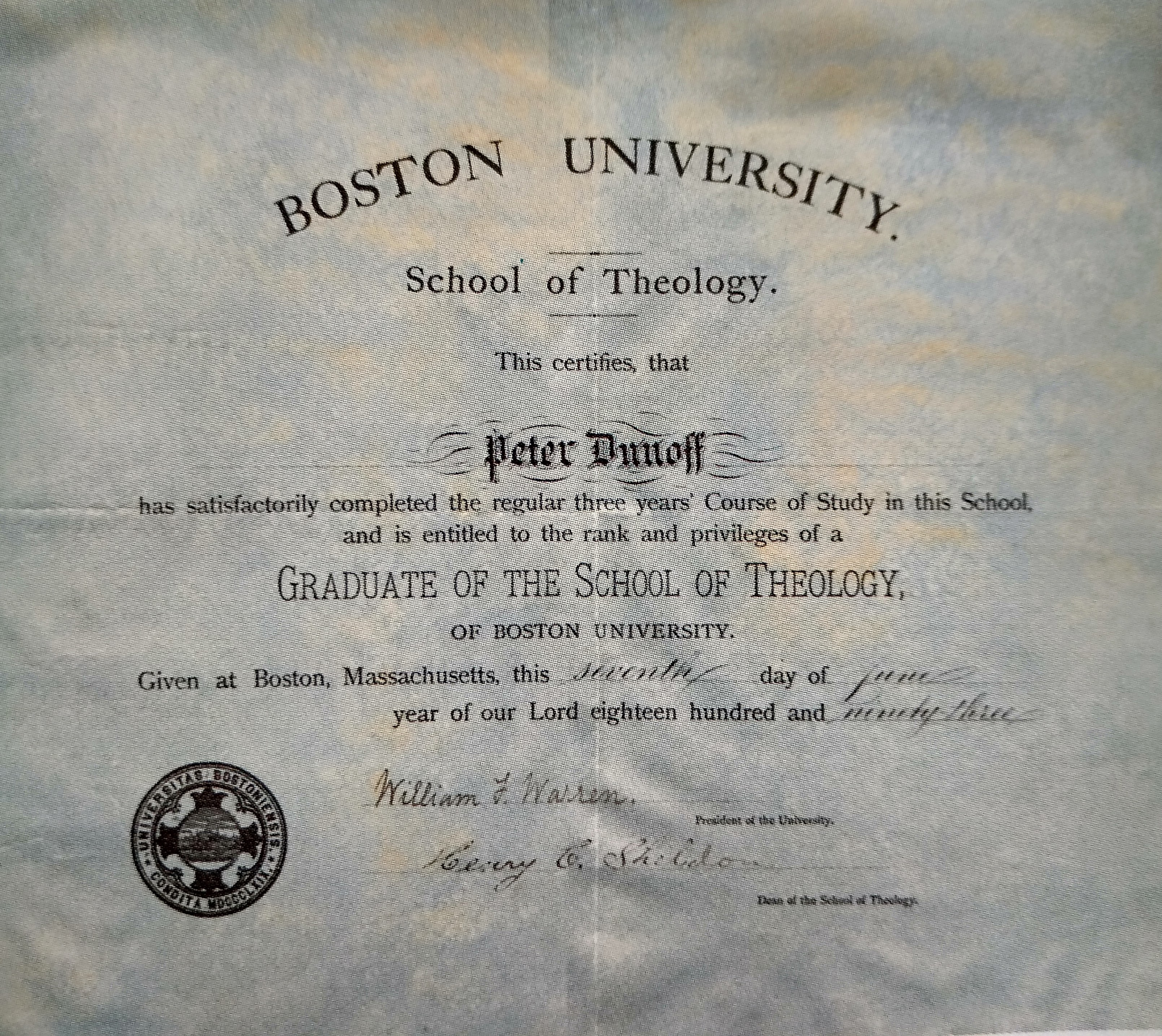
The diploma of Dunov from the Theological Faculty of Boston University (June 7, 1893)

Dunov attended secondary school in Varna and the American Methodist School of Theology and Science in Svishtov, from which he graduated in 1887. He worked as a primary school teacher for a year before leaving for the United States (1888), where he studied theology at Drew Theological Seminary in Madison, New Jersey. After graduating from Drew, he enrolled in the Boston University School of Theology and obtained his degree in June 1893 with a thesis on "The Migration of the Germanic Tribes and Their Christianisation" (published in 2007). In July he entered the School of Medicine of Boston University. In 1895 he returned to Bulgaria.

=== Return to Bulgaria ===
Upon his return to Bulgaria, Dunov was offered the position of a Methodist pastor in the city of Yambol. This offer was withdrawn after he stipulated he would only serve without remuneration. In 1896 he published Science and Education, in which he analyzed the development of mankind into a new culture, which he thought was bound to take place during the forthcoming century. He is engaged in educational and social activities.

In 1897, Petar Dunov had a mystical experience – the descent of the Divine Spirit on him, which was a key moment in his life. This takes place on March 7 (old style) in Varna. It is believed that then "he accepts the 'duty' of a spiritual Master who has incarnated in this body of his". This spiritual obligation, combined with a civic position, Dunov followed steadfastly until the end of his life, working among the Bulgarian people "for their acceptance of Divine Love, Wisdom and Truth, as the highest ideal for man". Later that year, Petar Dunov founded in Varna Society for Raising the Religious Spirit of the Bulgarian People. In 1898, he recorded and delivered the speech A call to my people – Bulgarian sons of the Slavic family, which was an appeal to social and spiritual self-affirmation. Next year he wrote The Ten Testimonies of God and God's Promise. In 1900, he published a mystical text under the title Hio-eli-meli-Mesail. Voice of God, alias "Emmanuel"; the original manuscript was begun on his sacred date of March 7, 1897. His first three disciples belonged to different branches of Christianity – Todor Stoimenov (Eastern Orthodox), Dr. Mirkovich (Catholic) and Penyu Kirov (Protestant). Their affection slowly grew into a devotion, in which Dunov envisioned those disciples as potential founders of the new teaching. In 1900, he extended invitations to all three to participate in a meeting in Varna, regarded as the first annual convention of what later evolved into a spiritual community enduring until the end of Dunov's life. Thus he gradually became the center of a spiritual society.

=== Creation of doctrine and school ===
Since 1900, Petar Dunov has convened annual assemblies held in various places: in Varna (1900, 1903, 1905–1909), Burgas (1901, 1902 and 1904), Tarnovo (1910–1925), in Sofia (1926–1941), on the Rila and Vitosha mountains. They become important forums where he gives talks, gives specific spiritual tasks and work for the coming year.

From 1901 to 1912 Dunov traveled throughout Bulgaria, giving talks and undertaking phrenological research. He met with a wide circle of people. From 1904, he resided for long periods of time in Sofia, the capital of Bulgaria, and began to give public talks on Sundays. In 1912, in the village of Arbanasi, he worked on the Bible and compiled the Testament of the Colored Rays of Light, which was published in September. On the title page is written the motto: "I will always be a devoted servant of the Lord Jesus Christ, Son of God, August 15, Tarnovo, 1912".

On March 9, 1914, he announced the beginning of the new Age of Aquarius. On March 16, his Sunday sermon was transcribed by a stenographer for the first time. This is Behold, the Man! (Ecce Homo in Latin). It is also the beginning of the Sunday sermons series published under the title Power and Life, in which he sets out the main principles of his teaching.

On February 8, 1917 in Sofia, he began another series of special lectures for married women, known as the Great Mother cycle, which would last every Thursday until June 30, 1932. In 1917–1918, during the World War I, the government of Vassil Radoslavov interned him in Varna under the pretext that his teaching weakened the spirit of the soldiers at the front and because of his opinion that Bulgaria should not participate in the war. After the end of the war in 1918, the number of his followers throughout the country grew rapidly. The Bulgarian Orthodox Church considered Deunov a greater danger than Catholic or Protestant propaganda (which "has no new followers at all"). On July 7, 1922, the Synod of Bishops of the Bulgarian Orthodox Church declared Peter Deunov to have excommunicated himself, and his teachings to be heretical. Around 1936, the followers of Deunov were approximately 40,000, and there were also those from abroad.

On February 24, 1922, he opened an esoteric school in Sofia which he called the School of the Universal White Brotherhood. It consisted of two classes of students – General Occult Class and Special (Youth) Occult Class. The General class was for listeners of any age and marital status, and the Youth class was only for young people personally invited by Dunov. The lectures were given once a week and continued for 22 years – until December 1944.

In 1927 the community Izgreva (Sunrise) was established. A site at what were then the outskirts of Sofia, it was the gathering place in the mornings for Dunov and his disciples. Many followers started building nearby and the place eventually became the center of a large spiritual community. Dunov gave lectures in the newly constructed Lecture Hall. The themes of the different lecture streams were wide-ranging and encompassed, among others: religion, music, geometry, astrology, philosophy and esoteric science. Overall, his thoughts were also recorded in talks, private conversations, and early letters.

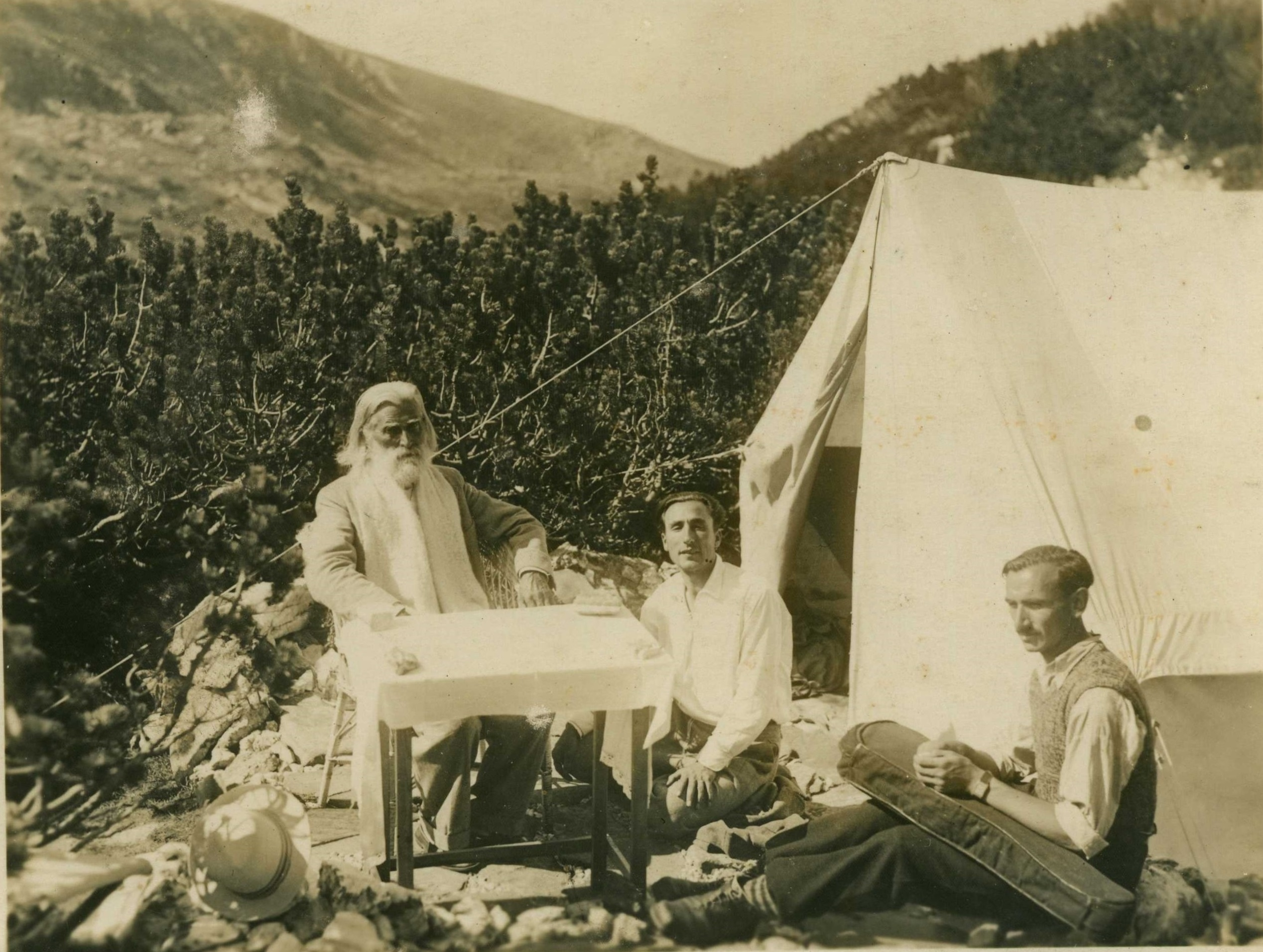
Petar Dunov with violinists in Rila (1938) recording the songs of Paneurhythmy and preparing of the first edition of Songs from the Teacher

At that time, he began working on the Paneurhythmy – a cycle of exercises composed of melody, text and plastic movements, with the aim being to improve and maintain human health and stimulate the harmonious development of availability, abilities, emotions and attitudes towards life by achieving harmony with nature (the universe). In the summer of 1929, Dunov took his followers and disciples to a camp near the Seven Rila Lakes for the first time.

On September 21, 1930, he opened a new stream of his sermons, called Sunday Morning Sermons, which continued until April 1944. On May 4, 1936, a political activist attacked him, causing a cerebral hemorrhage and partial paralysis. Although in a bad condition, on July 14 he went with his students to a camp near the Seven Rila Lakes and completely recovered his health. On March 22, 1939 he wrote a message to his disciples entitled The Eternal Covenant of the Spirit.

=== Late life ===
At the beginning of 1944, during the heavy air bombardments over Sofia, said to his disciples: "There are no more here conditions for a person to maintain his relationship with God. Let's get out of here" and together with a small group of them went to the village of Marchaevo (24 km southwest of Sofia), at the foot of Vitosha. He settled in the home (now a museum) of his disciple Temelko Gyorev. Many of his followers also settled in the village, and others periodically went there from Sofia. Talks continued in Murchaevo, and the last meeting of the Brotherhood took place there. Dunov returned to Izgreva on October 19, 1944. On December 20, 1944, he delivered the lecture The Last Word to the Common Occult Class.

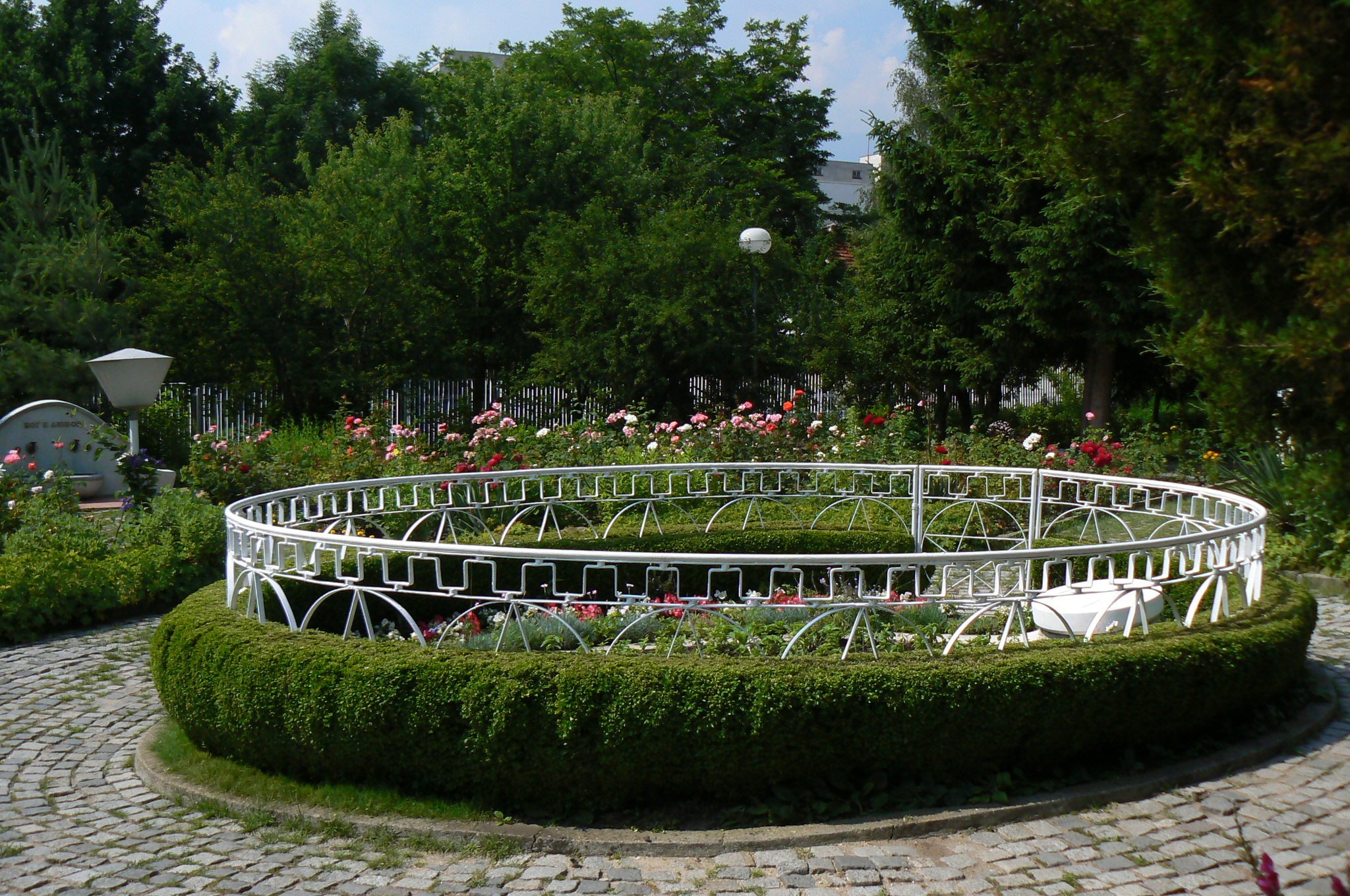
Grave of Peter Dunov in Izgrev neighbourhood, Sofia, Bulgaria

Petar Dunov died on 27 December 1944 and was buried at Izgreva. In 1976, this place was declared a Memorial Site by the State Culture Committee headed by Lyudmila Zhivkova. In 1998, it was declared a Cultural Monument of National Importance as Historical place and grave of Petar Dunov (The Teacher). Since 2004, a nearby square has been named Petar Dunov - The Teacher.

Dunov was against the registration of his brotherhood as an organization. In 1921, his adherents from Ruse, without his approval, drew up a statute to register as an organization, elected a Board, made membership cards, etc. They were registered as "White Brotherhood Society". Dunov reacted disapprovingly, his opinion was that their society did not need such an organization: "Well, what does this society need from statutes? Since other societies have statutes, why don't you sit with them? All your fault lies in the fact that you want to come here to manifest yourselves as in the world. No, here you will manifest yourselves in the most natural, divine way". According to him, they should not rely on human orders and regulations, but live according to God's, because good and love do not work with statutes. He did not allow statutes to be drawn up and registered with the state authorities.

However, after his death in 1944, the Council of the Brotherhood, formed by his disciples, decided that the recognition of the Brotherhood as a religious community would help their activities under the established communist regime and in 1948, the White Brotherhood Society was registered as a religious community.

== Legacy ==
=== Lectures/sermons ===
The aspects of his teachings are presented and developed in over 7,000 of his lectures delivered in the period 1904–1944. Not all of them are published. Several thousand of Dunov's lectures were recorded by stenographers and are documented in the form of deciphered stenograms (some modified by editing and others left intact). They have been published in several multi-volume series – Sunday talks ("Strength and Life" series), Sunday morning talks, Thursday talks ("The Great Mother" cycle), lectures to the General Occult Class, lectures to the Youth (Special) Occult Class, congregational talks, and others. There are also a number of songs and prayers, among which The Good Prayer from 1900 is regarded as the most special.

=== Books ===
There are only a few books written personally by Petar Dunov. In his first book, Science and Education – the Beginnings of Human Life (1896), one can see the directions of his further activities and the basic principles that he subsequently developed in detail in his teaching: the relationship between religion and science and the need for their interaction, the need for modernization and scientific understanding of religious worldview, development of the abilities of a higher nature (the Divine principle in man) through correct scientific and pedagogical methods, the idea of the Integrity of the Universe and man as part of a collective organism.

In 1900 he published the brochure Khio-eli-meli-Mesail; in style, the text is reminiscent of prophetic texts from the Old Testament, and Dunov appears as an intermediary through whom the word of God is transmitted. In 1912, another work written by him personally was published: Testament of Colored Rays of Light. It is compiled based on Bible verses, grouped by color symbolism and intended to be read on different days of the week.

=== Music ===
Petar Danov studied music and the violin. In the 1900s, he began to compose songs based on biblical or his own texts, later called fraternal songs, and from 1922 he gave songs and melodies in his School, which he called occult musical exercises. According to him, they are a method of working for the esoteric student and are designed to tone and harmonize his mental processes.

=== Paneurhythmy ===
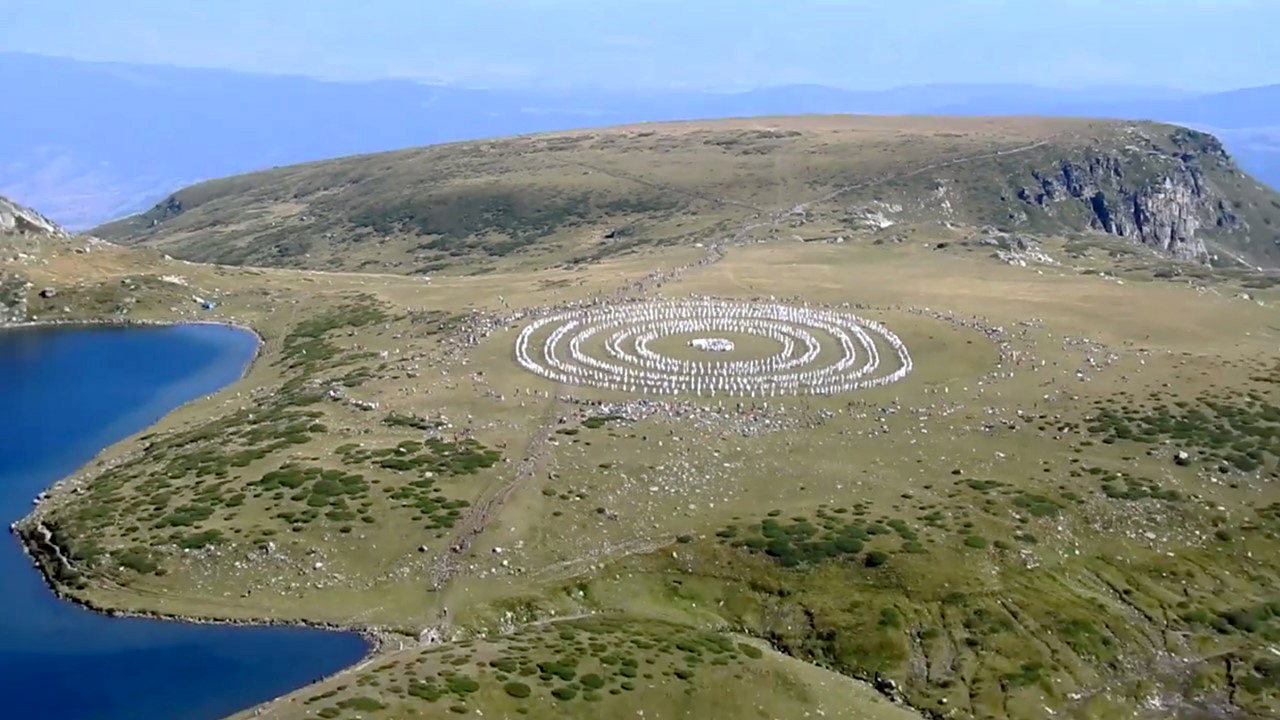
Paneurhythmy near Bubreka (Kidney) lake in Rila

In the years 1927–1944, he created and developed Paneurhythmy: a sequence of exercises performed to music, to achieve inner balance and harmonization. This practice promotes the processes of self-perfecting, expanding of the consciousness and attaining of virtues. The circle dance, is a conscious interchange between human beings and the forces of living nature. Each movement is the expression of a thought. The effect should be that the observer picks up from the movements, the thought or the idea they express. The rhythm in the movement of the physical body leads us to one in our spiritual life.
