= Seven Rila Lakes =

Group of lakes in Bulgaria

Coordinates: 42°12′09″N 23°18′54″E

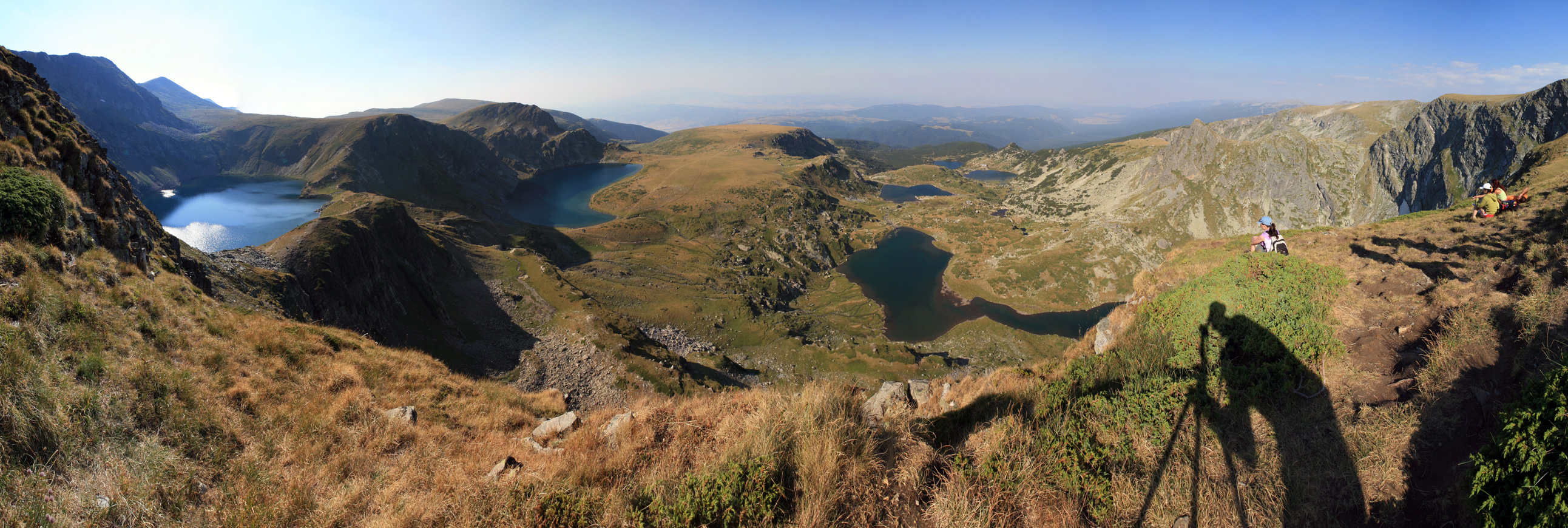
Panoramic view of the Seven Rila Lakes from Mount Ezeren

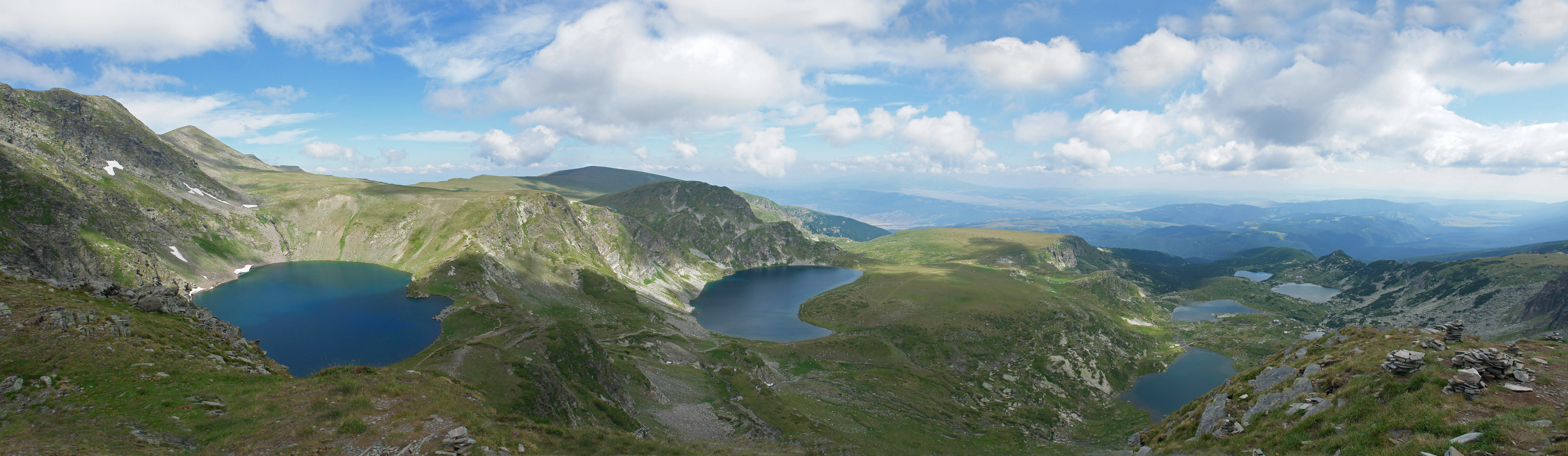
Panoramic view of the six lowest (and largest) lakes

The Seven Rila Lakes (Bulgarian: Седемте рилски езера, romanized: Sedemte rilski ezera, pronounced [sɛdɛmˈtɛ ˈriɫski ɛzɛˈra]) are a group of tarns—glacial lakes formed in cirques—in the northwestern part of Rila Mountain in Bulgaria. Situated between 2,100 and 2,500 metres elevation above sea level, they are the most visited group of lakes in Bulgaria.

Each lake carries a name associated with its most characteristic feature. The highest one is called Salzata ("The Tear") due to its clear waters that allow visibility in depth. The next one in height carries the name Okoto ("The Eye") after its almost perfectly oval form. Okoto is the deepest cirque lake in Bulgaria, with a depth of 37.5 m. Babreka ("The Kidney") is the lake with the steepest shores of the entire group. Bliznaka ("The Twin") is the largest one by area. Trilistnika ("The Trefoil") has an irregular shape and low shores. The shallowest lake is Ribnoto Ezero ("The Fish Lake") and the lowest one is Dolnoto Ezero ("The Lower Lake"), where the waters that flow out of the other lakes are gathered to form the Dzherman River.

The Seven Lakes are a tourist attraction in Bulgaria because of its natural environment. The lakes are located one above the other and are connected by small streams, which form tiny waterfalls and cascades. Tourist accommodation in the lakes' vicinity include a chalet on the northeastern shore of The Fish Lake, at an elevation of 2,196 m. The most common time to visit the lakes is summer, in July and August, when temperature is above 10 degrees Celsius and the risk of sudden storms is lower. During the rest of the year the weather can be severe. The lakes usually freeze during October, and do not melt before June. The ice cover can reach up to 2 meters.

== List ==
English name	Bulgarian name (transliterated)	Altitude	Area	Depth	Notes
The Tear	Сълзата (Salzata)	2,535 m (8,317 ft)	0.7 ha (1.7 acres)	4.5 m (15 ft)	Named after its clear waters
The Eye	Окото (Okoto)	2,440 m (8,010 ft)	6.8 ha (17 acres)	37.5 m (123 ft)	Named after its oval shape. Deepest cirque lake in Bulgaria
The Kidney	Бъбрека (Babreka)	2,282 m (7,487 ft)	8.5 ha (21 acres)	28.0 m (91.9 ft)	Steepest shores of all
The Twin	Близнака (Bliznaka)	2,243 m (7,359 ft)	9.1 ha (22 acres)	27.5 m (90 ft)	Largest by area
The Trefoil	Трилистника (Trilistnika)	2,216 m (7,270 ft)	2.6 ha (6.4 acres)	6.5 m (21 ft)	Irregular shape and low shores
Fish Lake	Рибното езеро (Ribnoto ezero)	2,184 m (7,165 ft)	3.5 ha (8.6 acres)	2.5 m (8.2 ft)	Shallowest
The Lower Lake	Долното езеро (Dolnoto ezero)	2,095 m (6,873 ft)	5.9 ha (15 acres)	11.0 m (36.1 ft)	Lowest

== Gallery ==
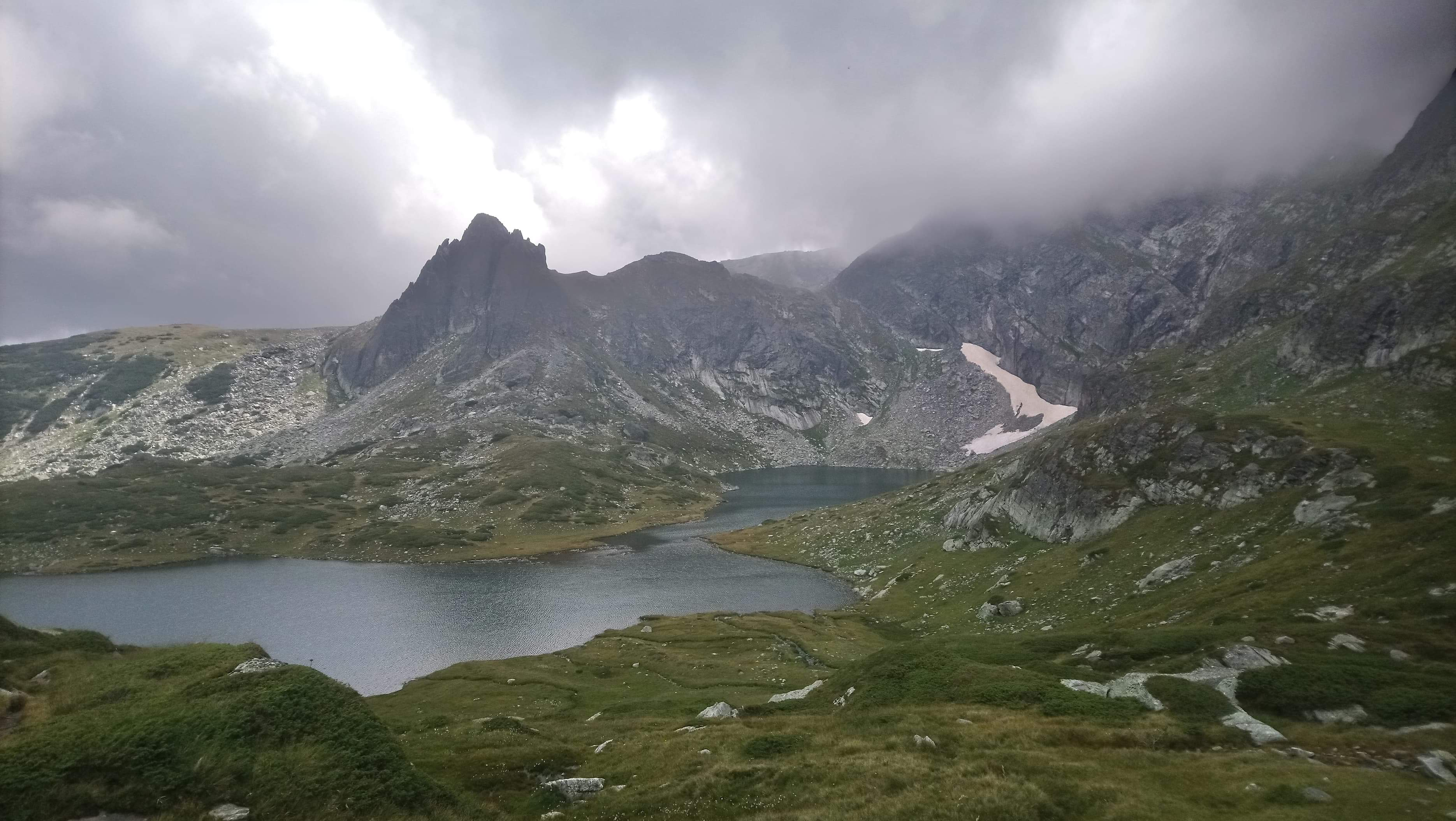
The Rila Lakes

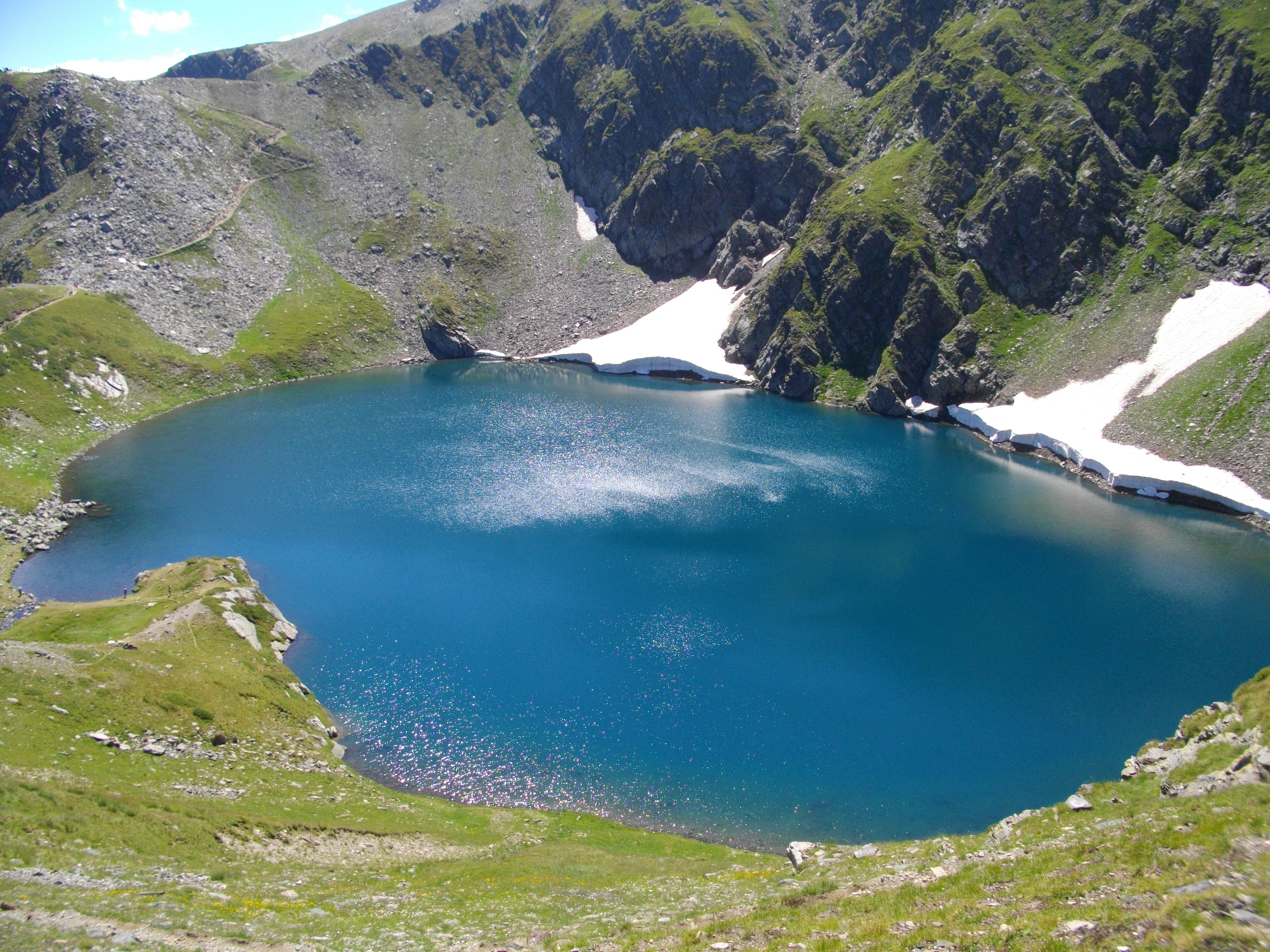
The Eye

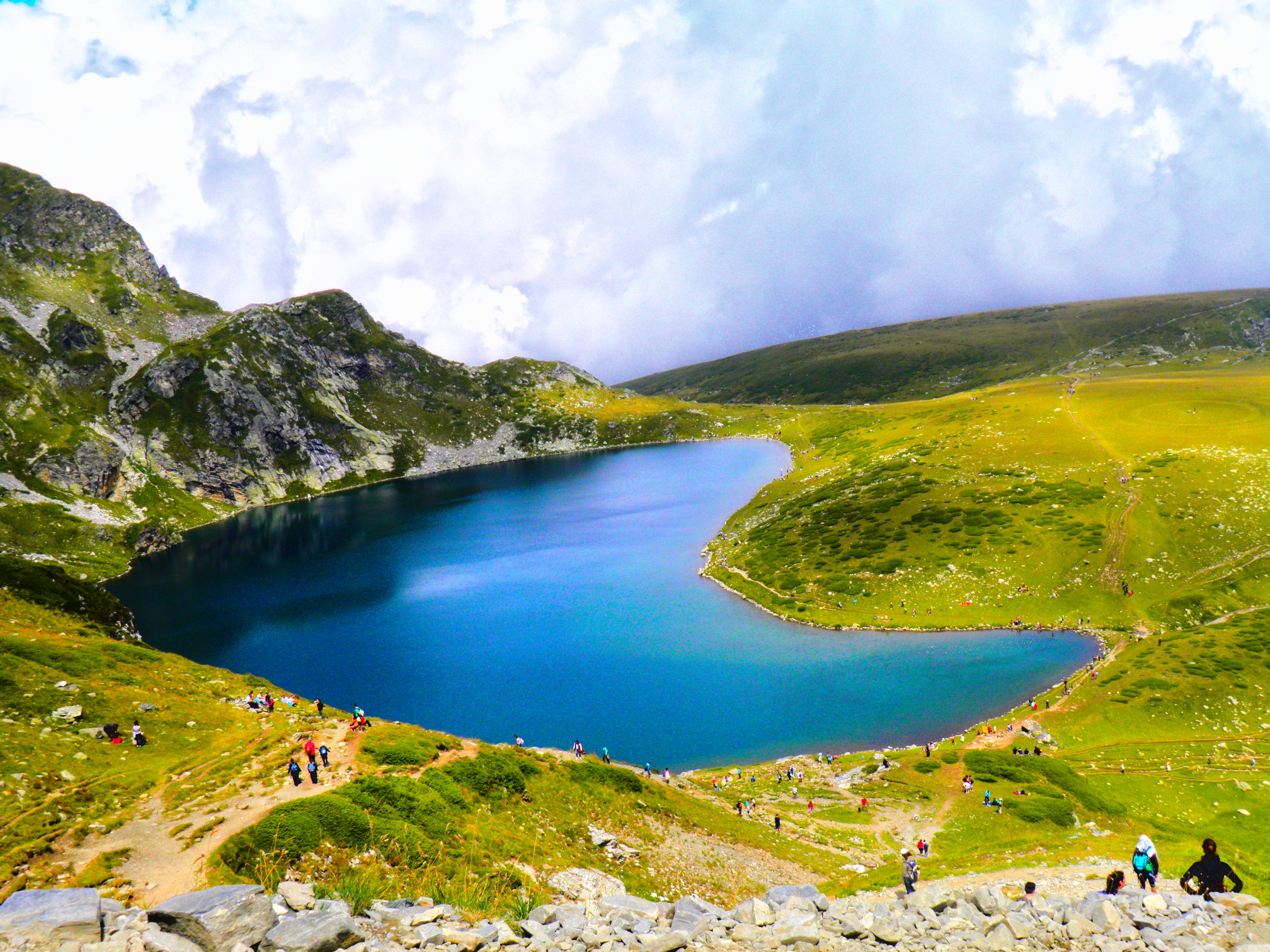
The Kidney

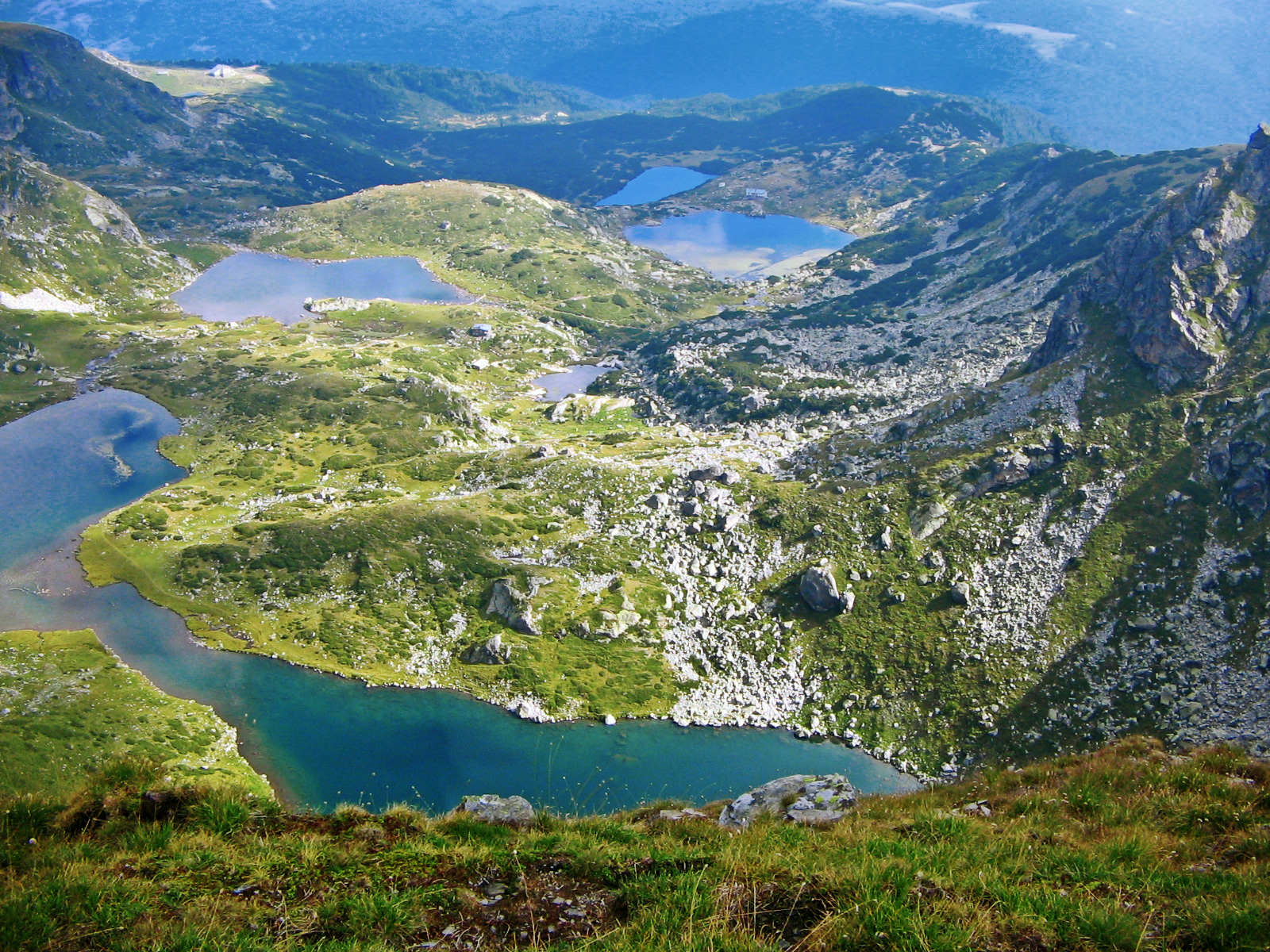
Lower Lake, Fish Lake, Trefoil and The Twin

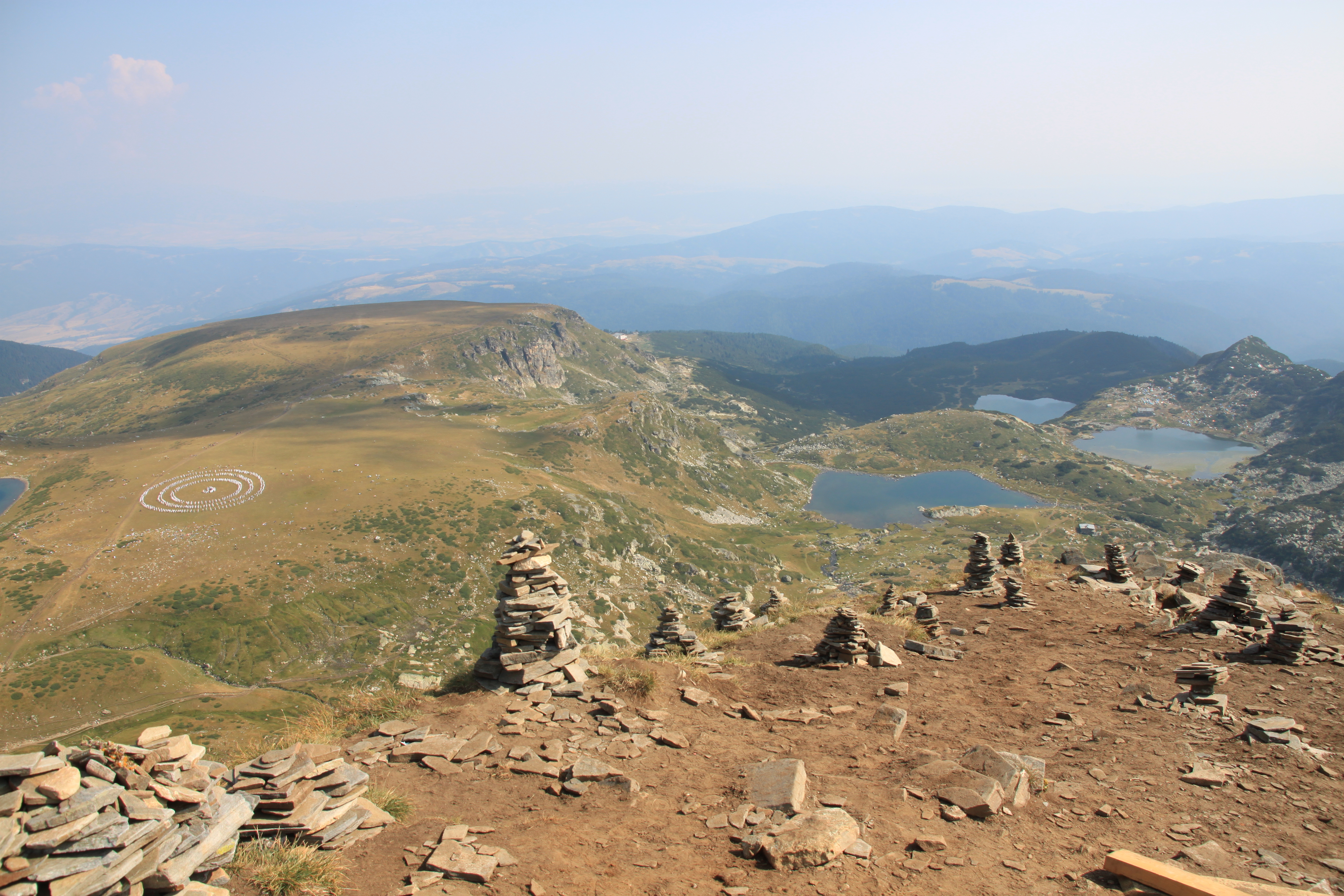
Seven Rila Lakes View

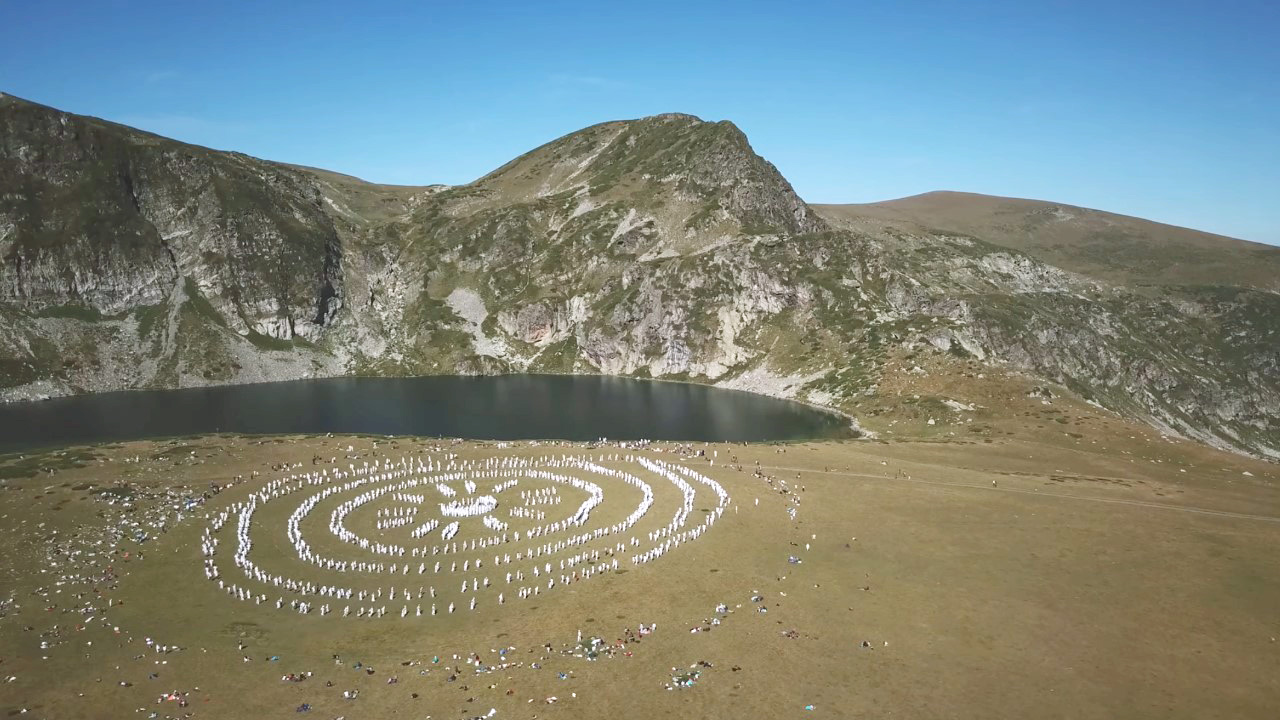
Paneurhythmy exercises in next to the Rila Lakes

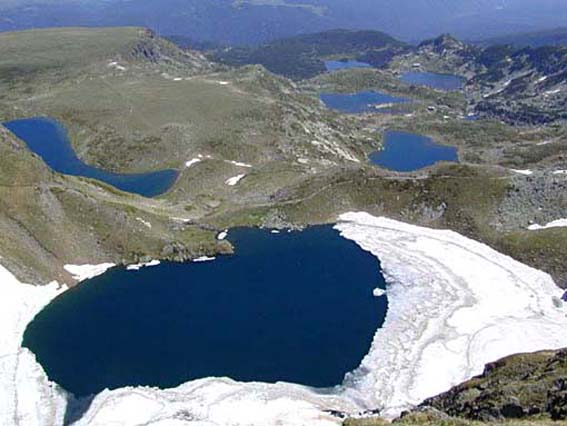
View of the Seven Rila Lakes

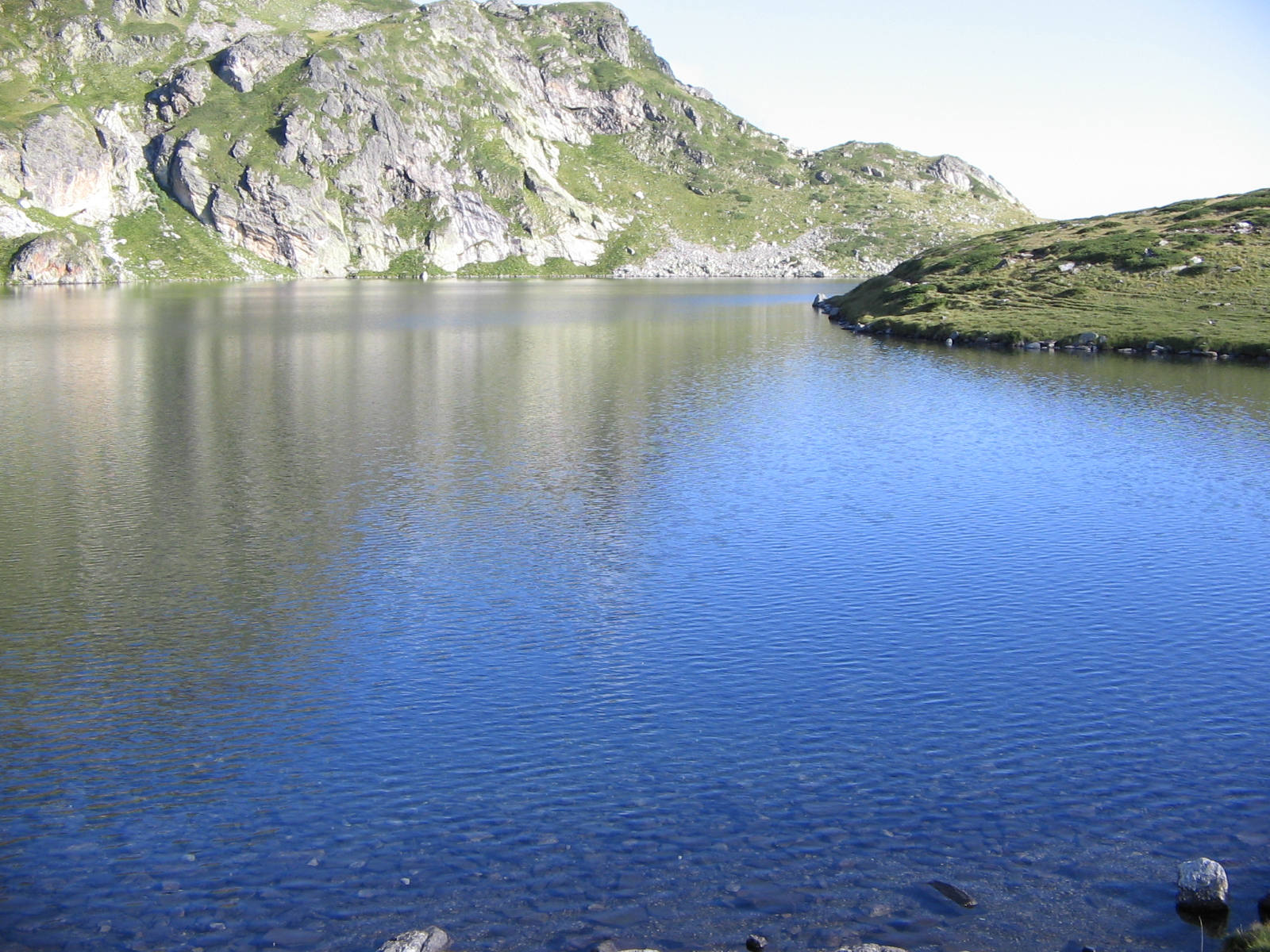
Lake Babreka

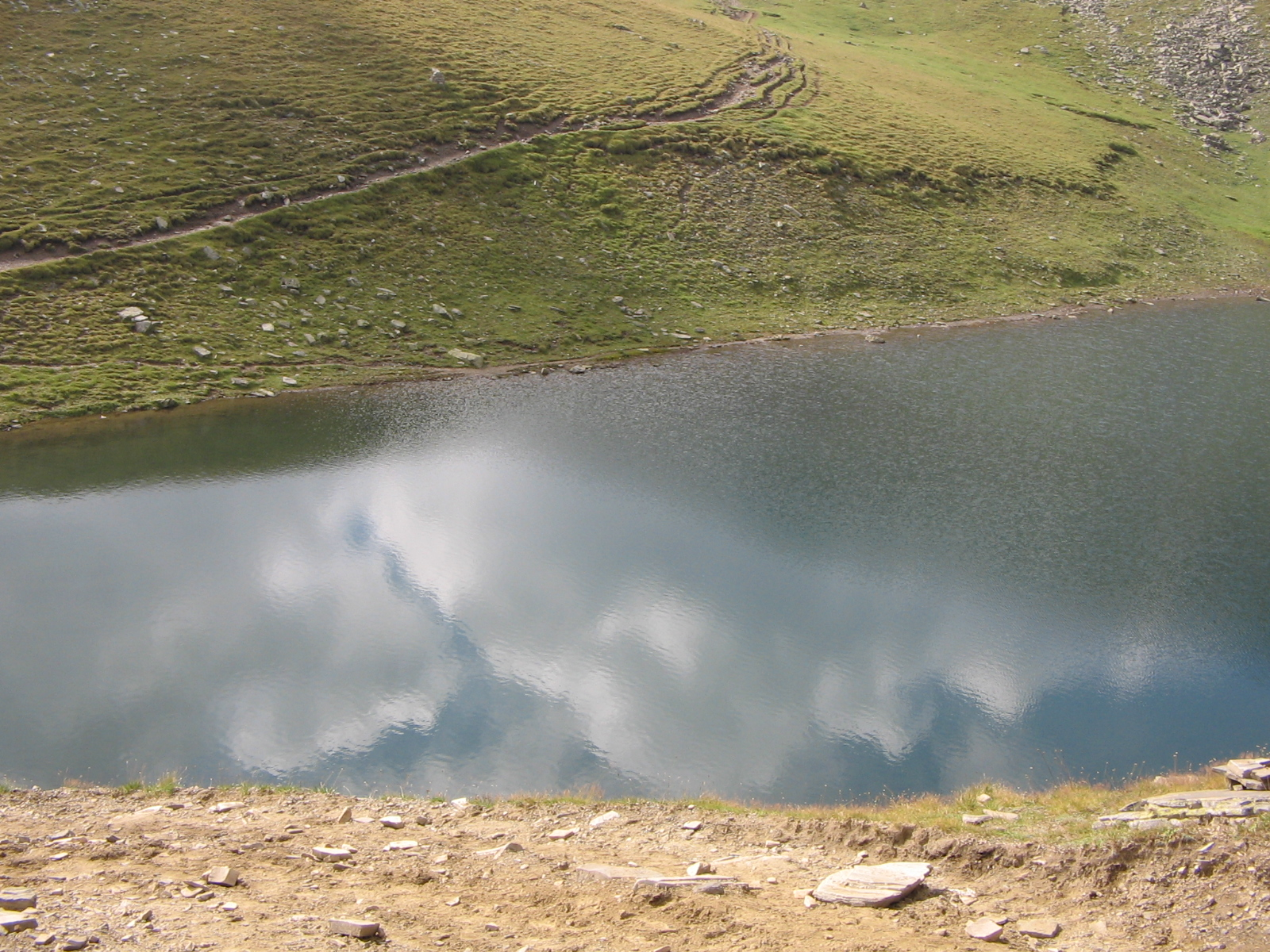
Lake Salzata

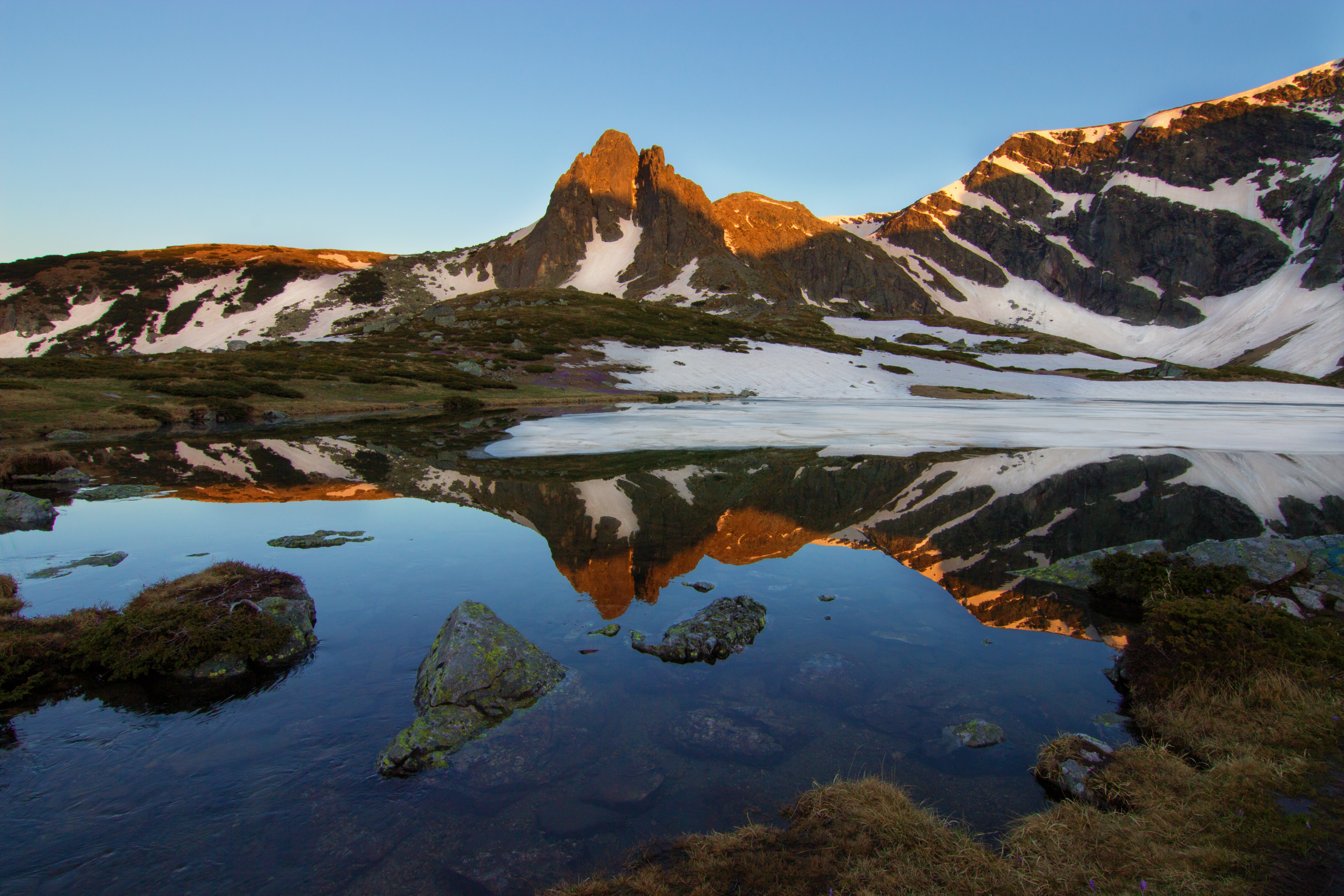
Lake Bliznaka

== See also ==
- List of lakes
- Lists of lakes
