= Paneurhythmy =

Exercises for physical/spiritual health

Paneurhythmy (Bulgarian: Паневритмия) is a system of physical musical exercises developed by Peter Deunov between 1922 and 1944, focused on achieving inner balance and harmonization. The emphasis of the exercises is on giving and receiving, with the goal of creating a conscious exchange with the forces of nature. Paneurhythmy is practiced for both physical fitness and spiritual development. The creator of paneurhythmy defines it as a science: "Paneurhythmy is a science that regulates one's physical, spiritual, and mental functions and is a combination of human thoughts, feelings, and actions."

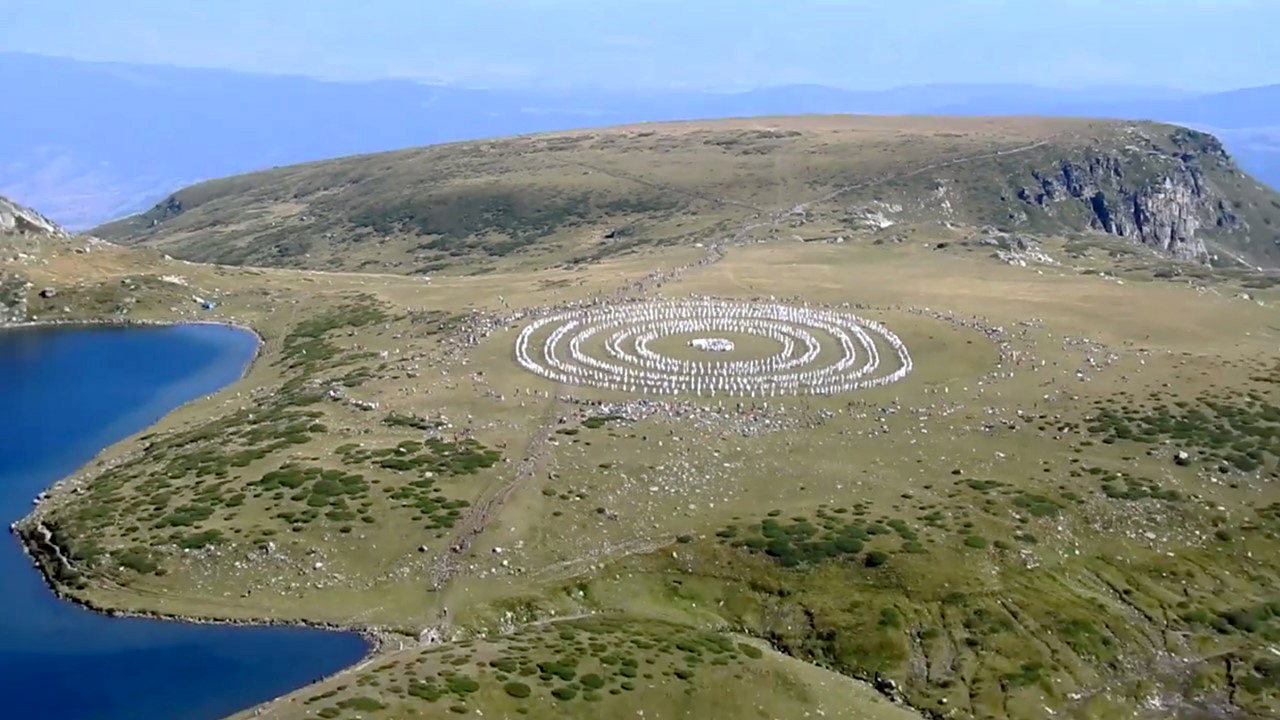
Paneurhythmy in the Rila Mountains, Bulgaria

== Overview ==
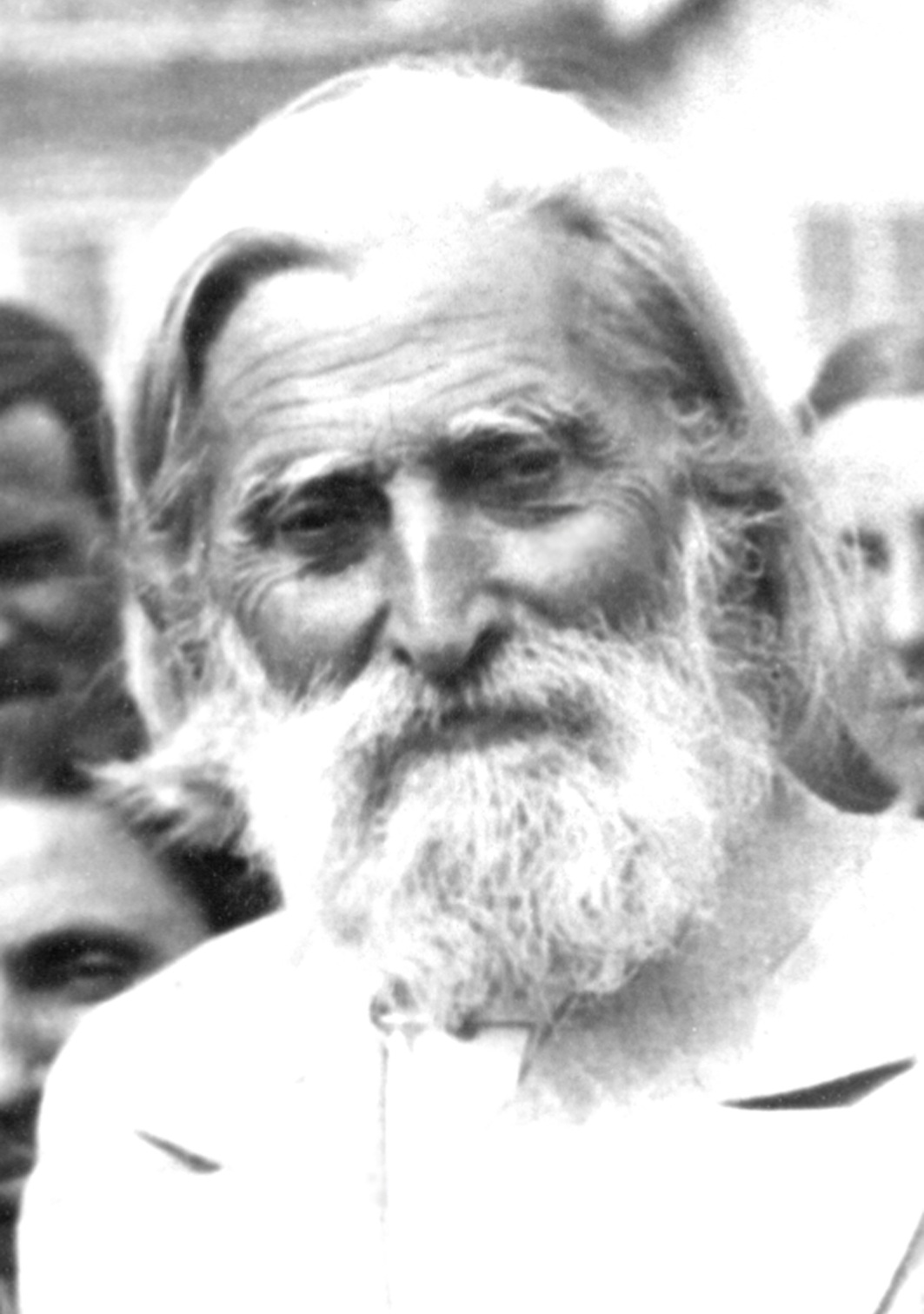
Peter Deunov, the founder of paneurhythmy

Etymologically, paneurhythmy is derived from three roots: Pan meaning the whole, everything, the cosmic, Eu meaning "the true" or "supreme", the essential, and rhythm meaning periodicity and correctness of movement. The prefix "pan" implies expression of rhythm that is innate to nature. Based on these etymological roots, paneurhythmy directly translates to Cosmic Sublime Rhythm.

The composer of the music and movements of paneurhythmy, Peter Deunov (also known as Beinsa Douno) developed the exercises in the 1930s in Bulgaria in an adaptive process, excluding some and adopting others in order to discover their optimal form. In Deunov's words: "Currently, the paneurhythmic figures have only the contours of movement. Later they will gain their substance, their core meaning, and details".

The idea of living with harmony with nature is prominent in the practice of paneurhythmy. Based on Deunov's recommendations, paneurthythmic exercises were to be done in the early morning and outside, preferably in a green meadow, and were most effective in the Spring, beginning 22 March. In his opinion, this was the time when nature was most receptive and contained the most prana, or living energy that could be absorbed by the human body.

Paneurhythmy also contains an emphasis on building a new culture of love, fraternity, and freedom. Deunov believed there was a direct connection between thought and movement, that through the harmony between music, movement, and ideas, paneurhythmy was capable of promoting creative forces within the greater society.

Over time, Paneurhythmy has attracted the attention of people from different cultures and nationalities, despite the 40-year communist regime in Bulgaria that forbade such practices. The collective dancing at Seven Rila Lakes in the Rila mountains on 19–21 August can be singled out as the largest gathering, with over 2000 practitioners attending per year from a variety of countries, including France, Canada, Italy, Ukraine, and Russia.

== Structure ==
Paneurhythmy is composed of three parts: 28 Exercises, Sun's Rays, and Pentagram, which are performed one after the other. They consist of different exercises and are characterized by different features, way of arrangement and movement of the participants, duration. Each exercise has a certain philosophical idea expressed through its music, movements, name and lyrics. All exercises, as well as the three sections, are arranged in a meaningful sequence, they are believed to represent successive moments of individual and collective human development. A typical paneurhythmy session complete with all three parts is 70 minutes long, however practicing the first 28 exercises independently with breaks in between is acceptable and takes 50 minutes. Paneurhythmy is practiced to strictly determined music. In most cases participants will move in a circle surrounding the musicians (instrumentalists and often singers or a choir) who typically perform in the center of the circle.

=== 28 Exercises ===
The first part, 28 Exercises, is a set of 28 exercises performed with a partner while moving in a circle with the musicians and/or singers in the center of the circle. Each of the exercises reveal an idea expressed through the name, the movements, and the music of the exercise. The first ten exercises, also known as The First Day of Spring, are performed sequentially without pausing. They represent the symbolic awakening of the soul, as nature is awoken in the Spring. In Deunov's opinion, focus on the movement of each exercise and the ideas associated to the exercise was key to performing the exercises correctly. His belief was that the exercises had to be performed thoughtfully and with love, rather than mechanically.

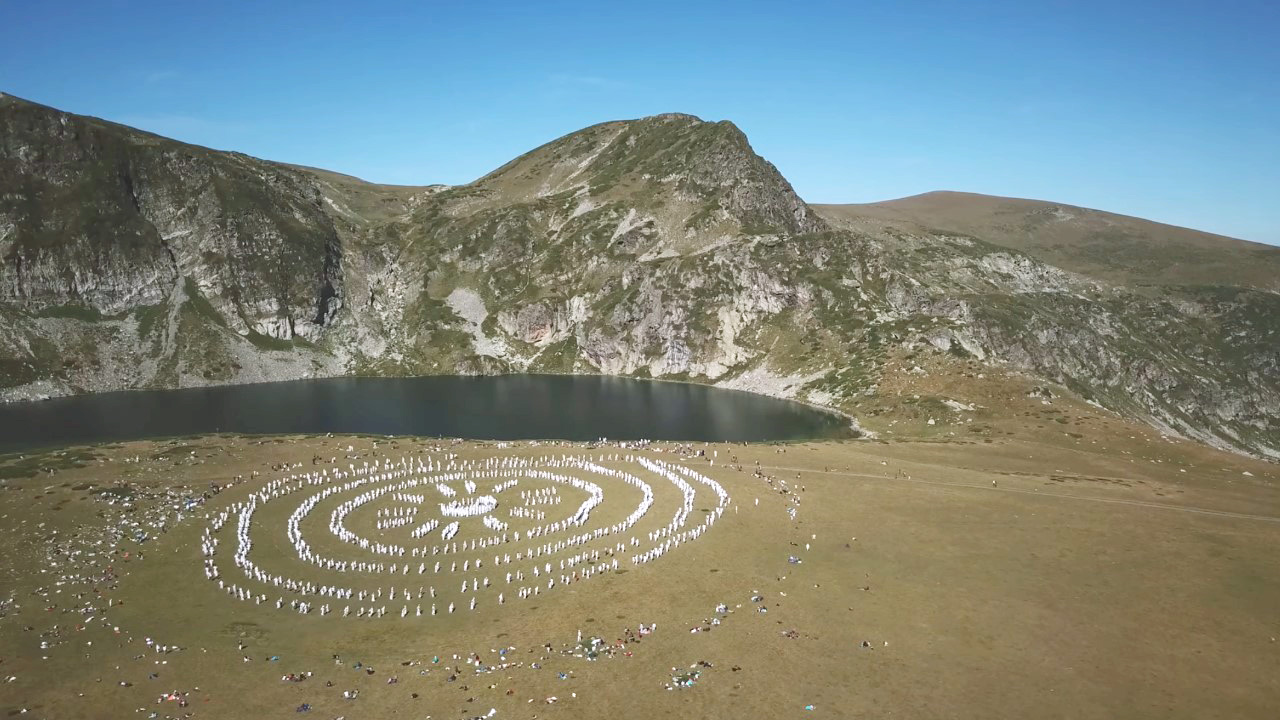
Paneurhythmy in the Rila Mountains - Sun's rays

=== Sun's Rays ===
Sun's Rays is a composition performed after the 28 exercises. The participants, arranged in pairs, form two groups: 12 rays to symbolically represent the opening of the twelve gates of life as expressed through the 12 signs of the zodiac, and an outside circle around the rays representing the wheel of life. Acting as radii, the 12 rays approach the center symbolizing the reception of vital forces and then go backward to infuse these forces into the outer circle. In the following motion, each partner in a pair performs circles around the other. These motions represent stages of development in which mankind is trapped in a circle of material consciousness. The third and fourth movements symbolize liberation from this circle and the subsequent joy associated with such release, as expressed through the singing and clapping of the participants.

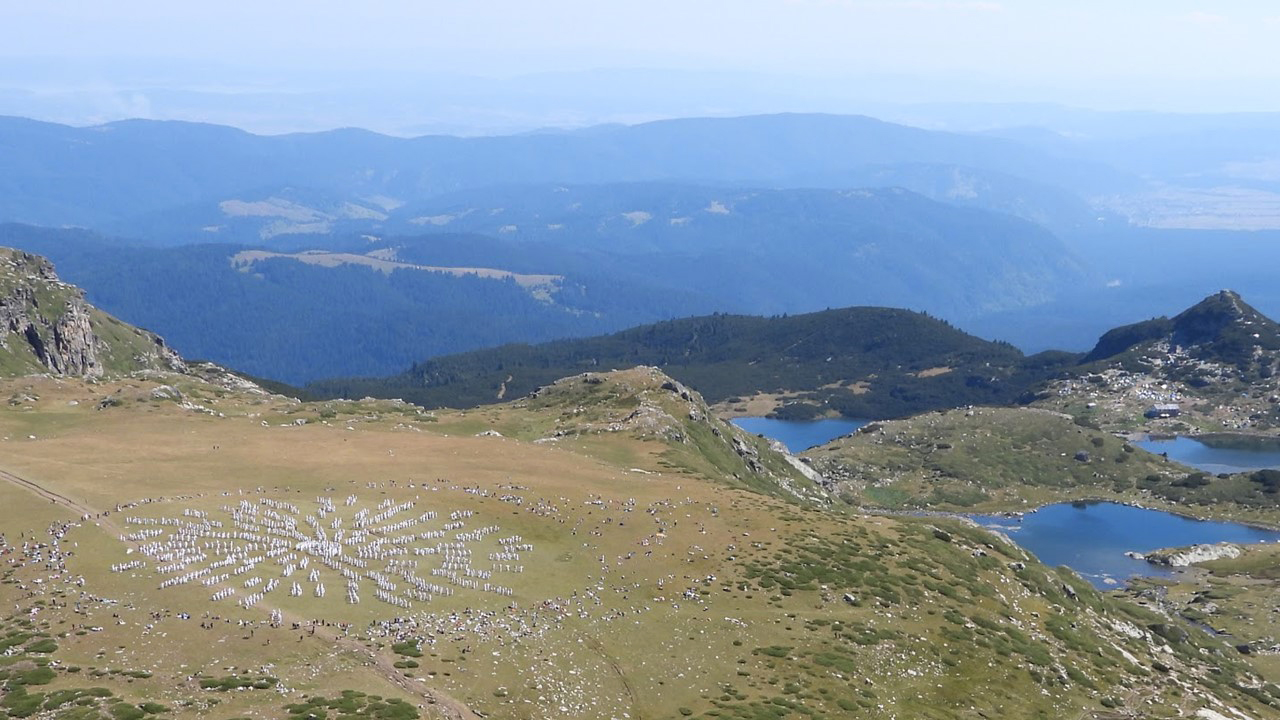
Paneurhythmy at the Seven Rila Lakes - Pentagram

=== Pentagram ===
The third part of paneurhythmy, Pentagram, is a symbolic representation of the path of the human soul to perfection, with each ray of the pentagram representing love, wisdom, truth, justice, and virtue respectively. The pentagram is also a metaphor for a cosmic man in motion, with the apices being the head, two hands, and two feet. The exercise is performed with five pairs of participants which move and exchange places, symbolizing that the positive virtues of an individual must be in motion in order for the qualities to have effect. Afterwards, the participants march forward, representing that the embodiment of the virtues has been achieved. These motions are repeated five times.

== Therapeutic potential ==
In the first published book on paneurhythmy from 1938, the exercises were defined primarily as a method for maintaining good health - in particular, as an intelligent interchange between man and nature with the goal of promoting health through rhythmic and harmonic movements, combined with corresponding music, concentration of thought, and correct breathing. Paneurhythmy is a non-competitive, social, wellness-related and interdisciplinary physical activity that is suitable for all ages. Due to the diversity of the exercises, it is theorized that they engage muscles and joints to improve the locomotion and balance of the human body. A number of studies have been performed to indicate potential positive effects of the practice on participants. A preliminary study in 2004 reported that the majority of participants indicated an improvement in the mental, physical and social aspects of their health, followed by a controlled study in 2007, which indicated significant improvement in the quality of life due to health improvement as a results of 6 months of paneurhythmy training. Other studies suggest a decrease in perceived stress and ego resiliency. Paneurhythmy has also been studied as a potential method of physical education, with one study suggesting significant improvements in balance, speed, and agility while another provides a comparative analysis of paneurhythmy and eurhythmy .
