= Musée Carnavalet =

Museum of the history of Paris

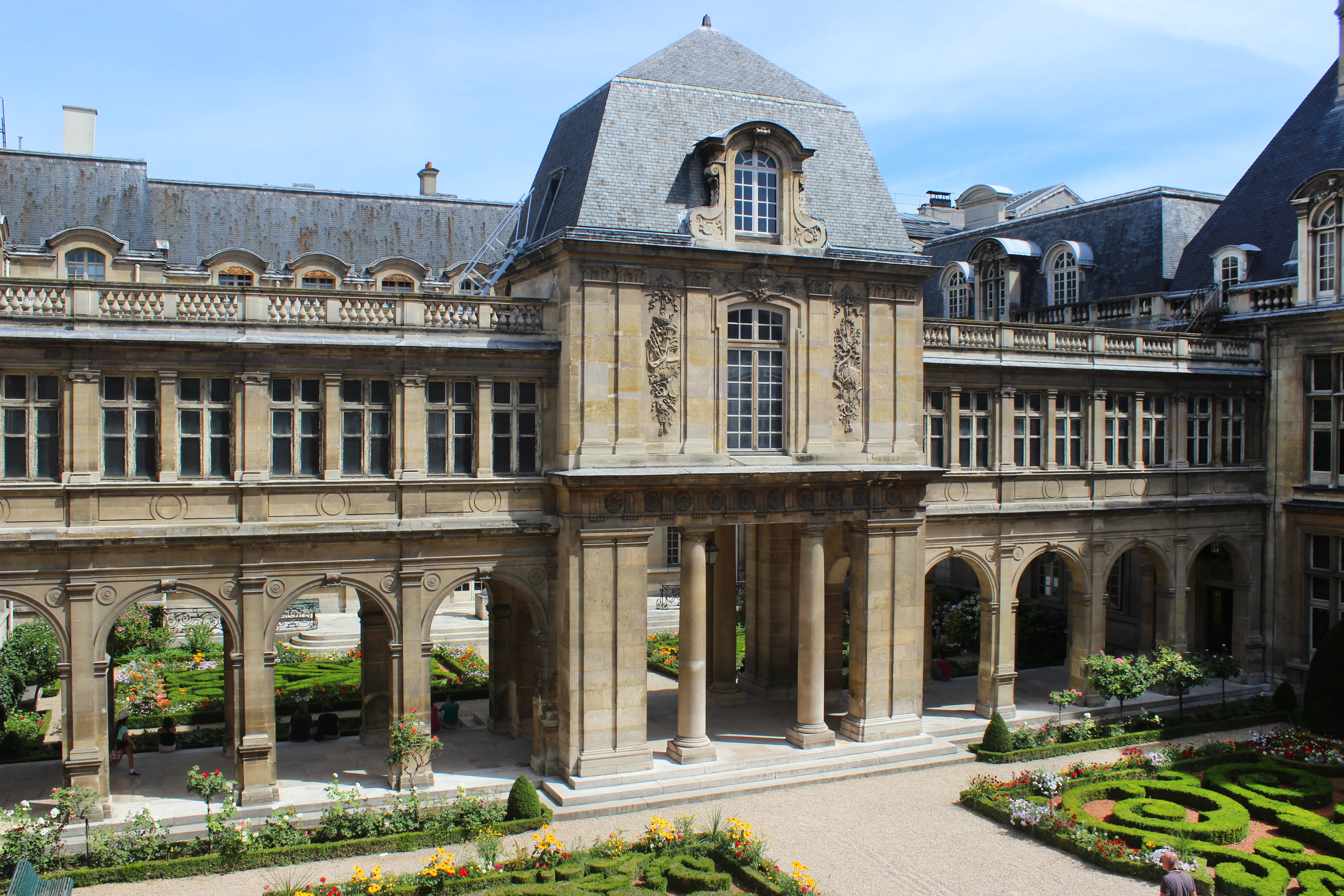
- Musée Carnavalet
- Interactive fullscreen map
- Established: December 1880
- Location: 23, Rue de Sévigné, 75003 Paris, France
- Coordinates: 48.8574°N 2.36214°E
- Type: History museum, art museum, historic site
- Collection size: 625.000 objects (2021)
- Visitors: 606,383 visitors (2021)
- Director: Jean-Marc Léri
- Public transit access: Saint-Paul
- Website: www.carnavalet.paris.fr

The Musée Carnavalet (French pronunciation: [myze kaʁnavalɛ]; English: Carnavalet Museum) in Paris is dedicated to the history of the city. The museum occupies two neighboring mansions: the Hôtel Carnavalet and the former Hôtel Le Peletier de Saint Fargeau. On the advice of Baron Haussmann, the civil servant who transformed Paris in the latter half of the 19th century, the Hôtel Carnavalet was purchased by the Municipal Council of Paris in 1866; it was opened to the public in 1880. By the latter part of the 20th century, the museum was full to capacity. The Hôtel Le Peletier de Saint Fargeau was annexed to the Carnavalet and opened to the public in 1989.

The building, a historic monument from the 16th century, contains furnished rooms from different periods of Paris history, historic objects, and a very large collection of paintings of Paris life; it features works by artists including Joos Van Cleve, Frans Pourbus the Younger, Jacques-Louis David, Hippolyte Lecomte, François Gérard, Louis-Léopold Boilly, and Étienne Aubry, to Tsuguharu Foujita, Louis Béroud, Jean Béraud, Carolus Duran, Jean-Louis Forain, Pierre Puvis de Chavannes, Johan Barthold Jongkind, Henri Gervex, Alfred Stevens, Paul Signac, and Simon-Auguste. They depict the city's history and development, and its notable characters.

The Carnavalet Museum is one of the fourteen City of Paris museums which have been incorporated since January 1, 2013 in the public institution Paris Musées. In October 2016, the museum was closed to the public for major renovation works. It reopened in 2021 with new rooms and galleries and an expanded collection.

== History ==
The land on which the museum stands was purchased in 1544 by Jacques de Ligneris, the president of the Parlement of Paris, who commissioned the architects Pierre Lescot and Jean Goujon to build a townhouse. In 1548, Lescot and Goujon left the project to construct the new Louvre Palace; the building was completed in about 1560 by Jean Bullant, who designed parts of the Tuileries Palace, the Louvre. the Château d'Écouen, and the gallery of the Chateau de Chenonceau spanning the River Cher in the Loire Valley.

In 1572, the hôtel was purchased by Madame de Kernevenoy, the widow of a member of the Court of Henry II of France, and the preceptor of the Duke of Anjou, who became Henry III of France. Her Breton name was difficult for the Parisians to pronounce, and gradually was transformed to "Carnavalet". During this period, the facade and portals were decorated with sculptures created by the sculptor Jean Goujon and his workshop.

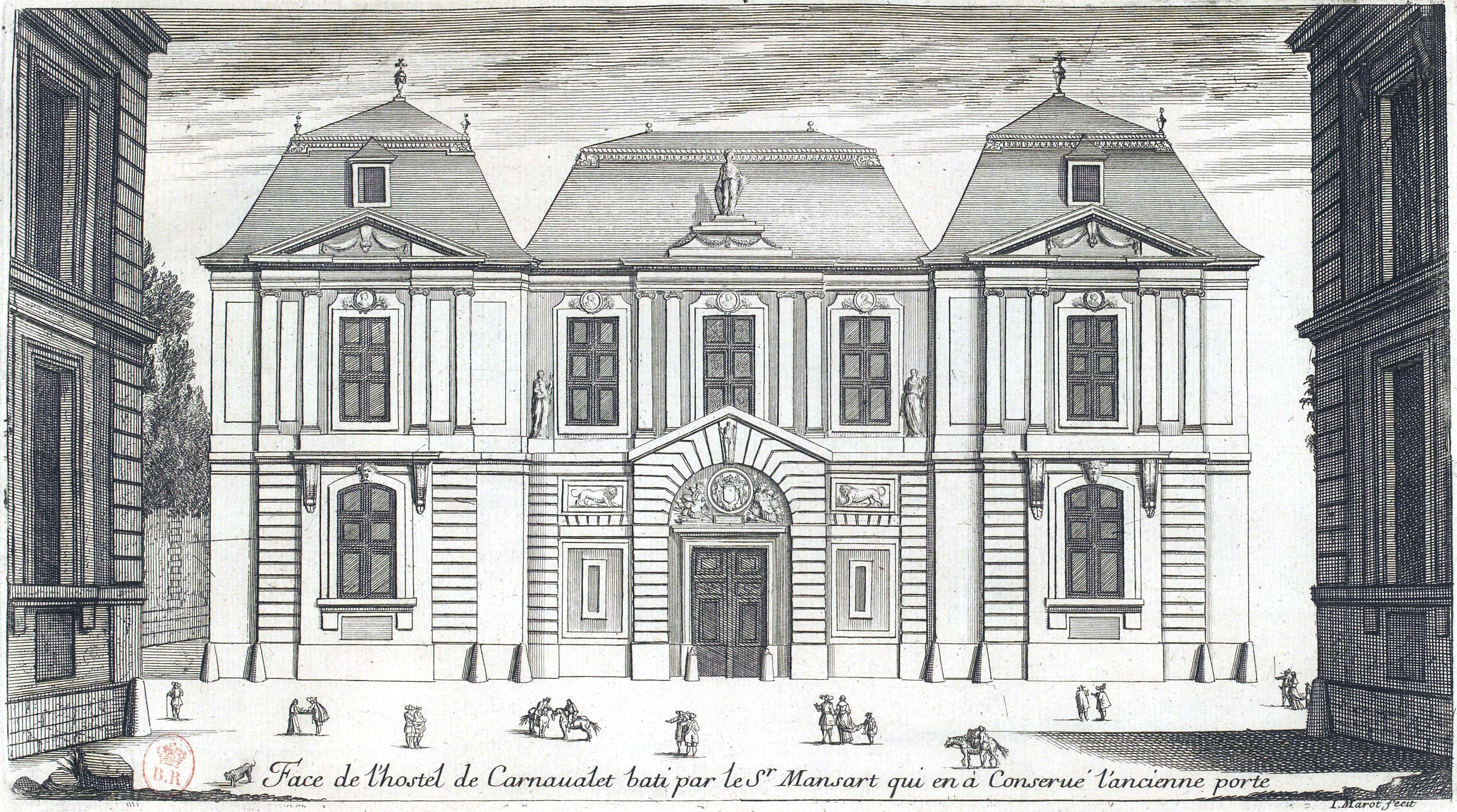
The facade by François Mansart as it appeared in 1686

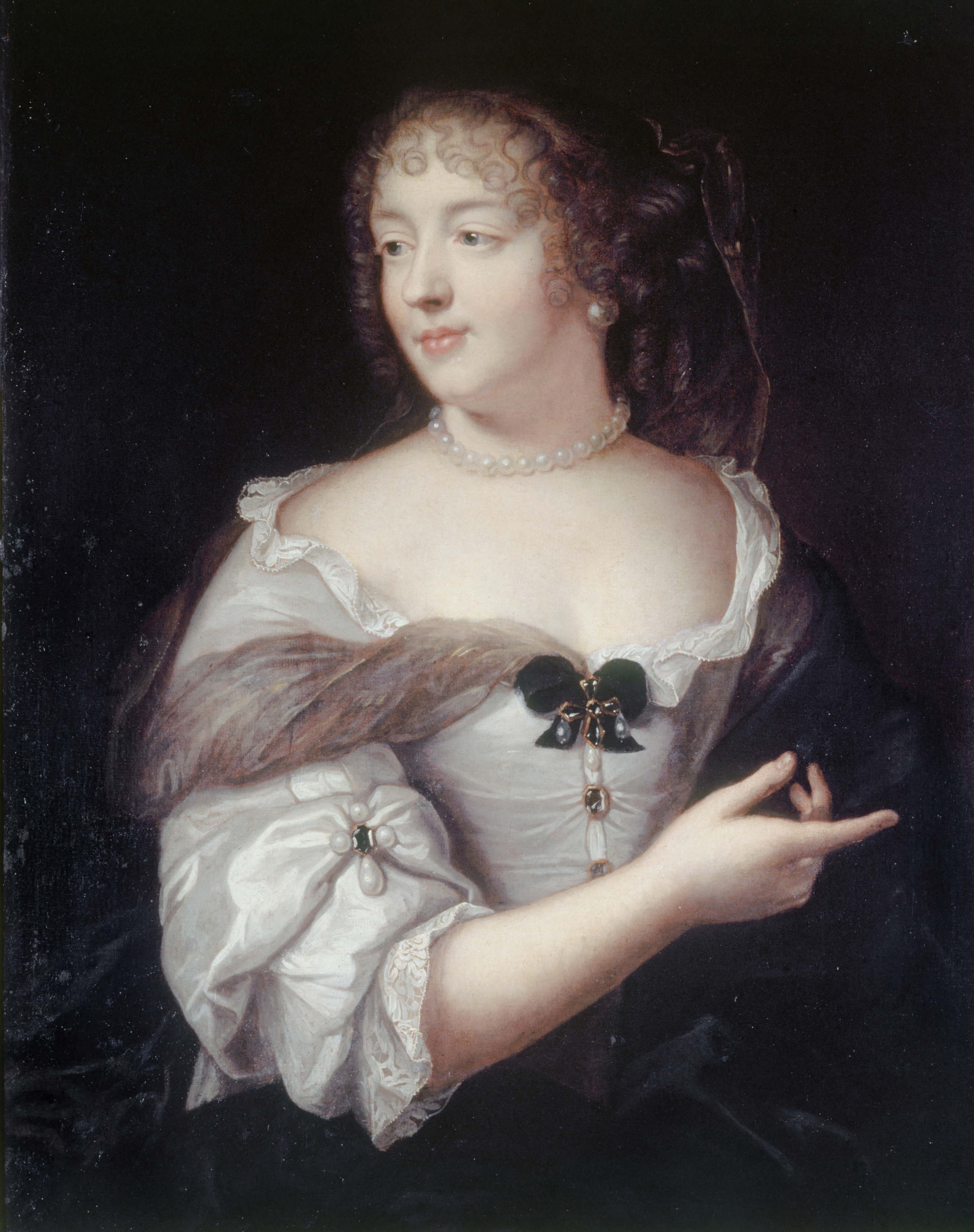
Marie de Rabutin-Chantal, marquise de Sévigné, who lived in the Hôtel from 1677 until 1696

The mansion was bought in 1654 by the intendant Claude Boislève, who commissioned the architect François Mansart to make extensive renovations in the new classical style. This included raising the height of the facade on the street and on the two wings by one storey, as well as the addition of groups of classical sculpture on the main facade and on the two wings. Boislève was closely associated with Fouquet, the royal chancellor who was accused of misusing royal funds to build his own palatial residence. The hôtel and furnishings were confiscated from Boisléve in 1662, and sold at auction. The new buyer rented the hotel in 1677 to Madame de Sévigné, famous for her letters describing the daily life and intrigues of the Parisian nobility. She lived in the Hôtel Carnavalet from 1677 until her death in 1696.

The idea of creating a museum of Paris history was launched by Baron Haussmann, who, under Napoleon III, was in the midst of his grand project of building new avenues, parks and squares in the center of the city. In 1866 he persuaded the city of Paris to purchase the Hôtel Carnavalet to house the museum, and assembled a large collection of history objects and documents. Until the museum was completed, the collection was stored in the vaults of the Hotel de Ville. In May 1871, in the last days of the Paris Commune, the Communards set fire to the Hotel de Ville, destroying the building, the city archives, and the collection. The door of the original Hotel de Ville, still charred from the fire, is on display in the museum. The collection was gradually rebuilt, and in 1880 the building formally became the museum of the history of Paris.

Many more additions followed, as the collection grew. In 1872, the building was enlarged on three sides, largely using vestiges of buildings demolished during Haussmann's construction of the Grand Boulevards in the center of the city. At the beginning of the 20th century, two new wings were added in the rear, which enclosed the garden. An even larger expansion program was begun in 1913 by he architect Roger Foucault. The project was interrupted by the First World War, but resumed after the war and was finally completed in 1921, doubling the exposition space. The new buildings finally enclosed the Cour Henri IV and the courtyard called "de la Victore".

In 1989, a nearby mansion, the Hôtel Le Peletier de Saint Fargeau, was purchased and connected with the museum. This hotel was also built in the middle of the 16th century, and was originally known as the Hôtel d'Orgeval. It was purchased by Michel Le Peletier and passed on eventually to his grandson, Le Peletier de Saint Fargeau, who was a representative of the nobility in the Estates-General of 1789. In 1793, Le Peletier voted for the execution of Louis XVI, and was murdered, in revenge for his vote, on January 20, 1793, the same day as the execution of the king. The Hôtel Le Peletier de Saint Fargeau was annexed to the Carnavalet. It was opened to the public in 1989, commemorating the bicentennial of the French Revolution.

The museum was closed in 2017 for a major renovation, and reopened in 2021. The museum as of 2021 had forty decorated rooms and galleries, and 3800 objects on display. The total collection, as of 2021, included 625,000 objects.

== Exterior ==
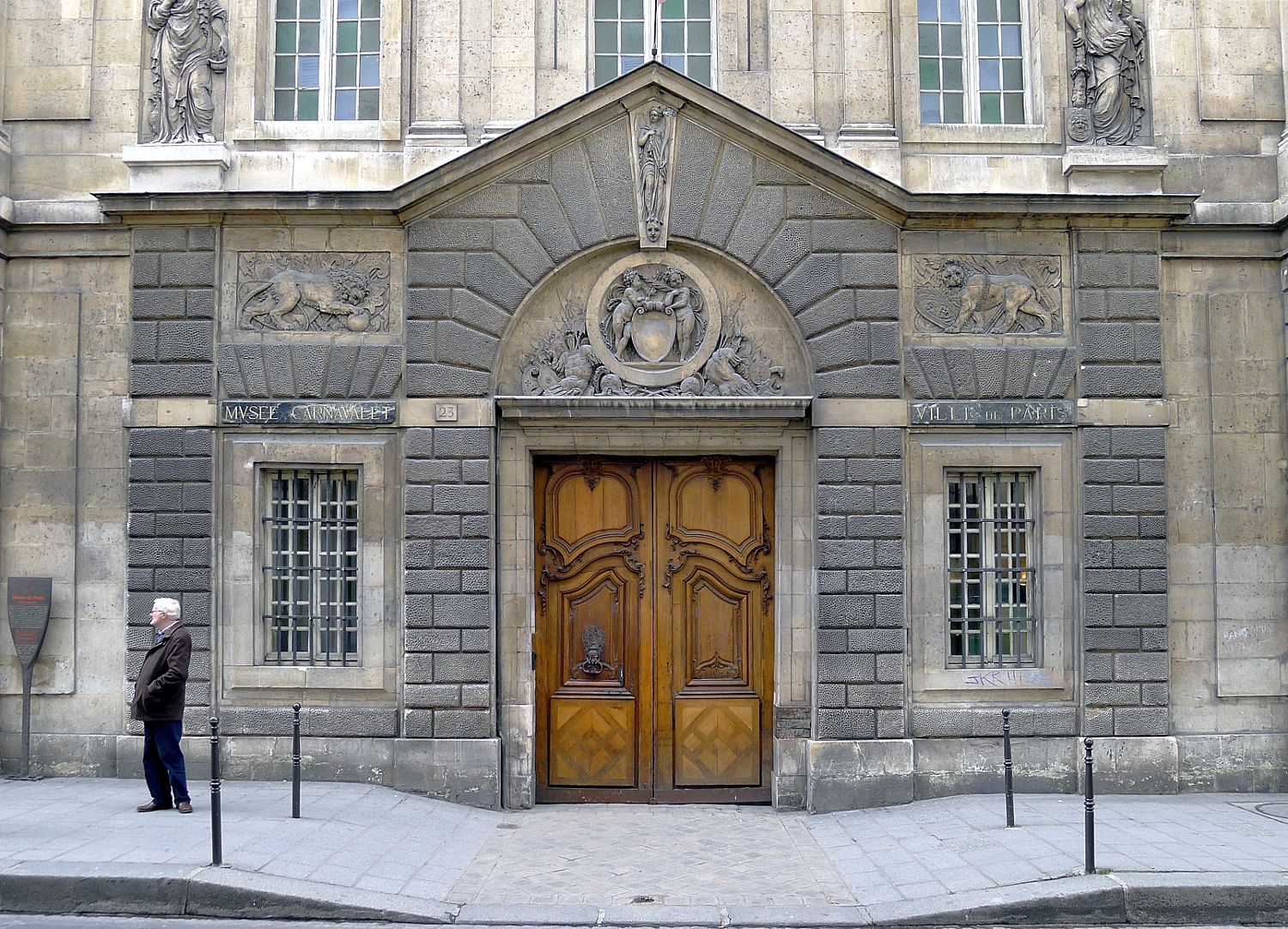
The original Renaissance portal of the building on Rue de Sévigné, preserved in the later structure (16th c.)

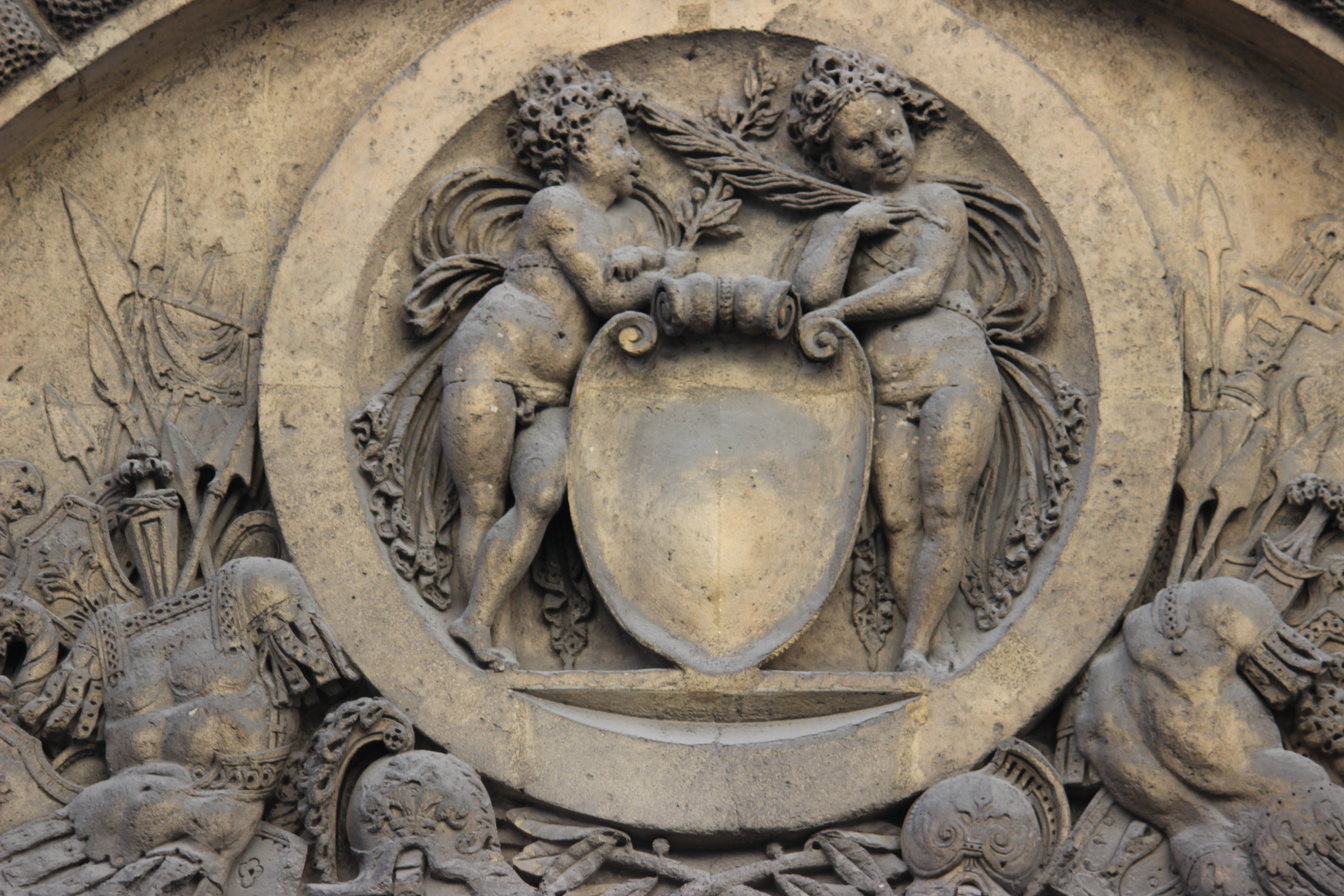
Detail of the portal sculpture on Rue de Sévigné

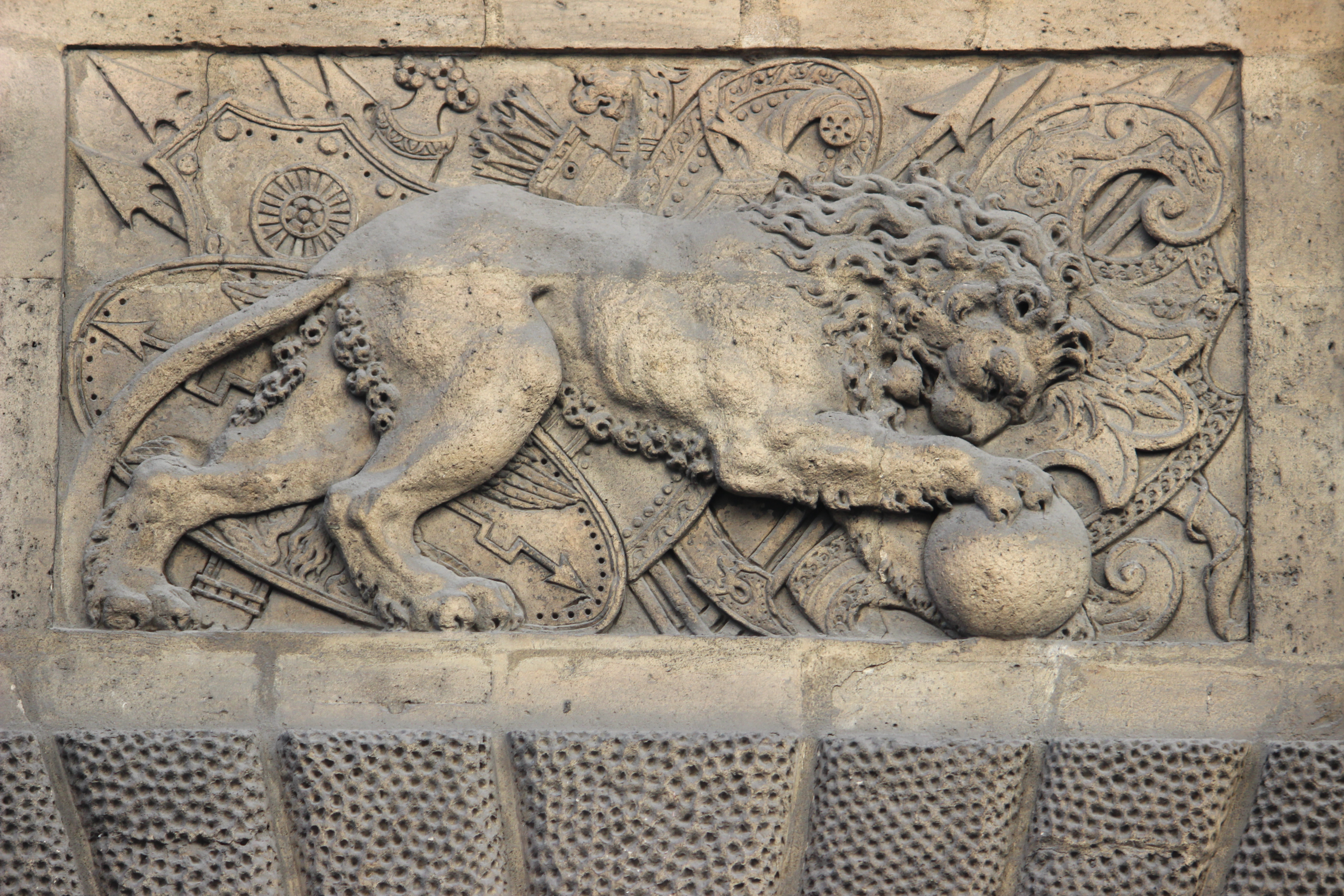
Detail of portal sculpture on Rue de Sévigné
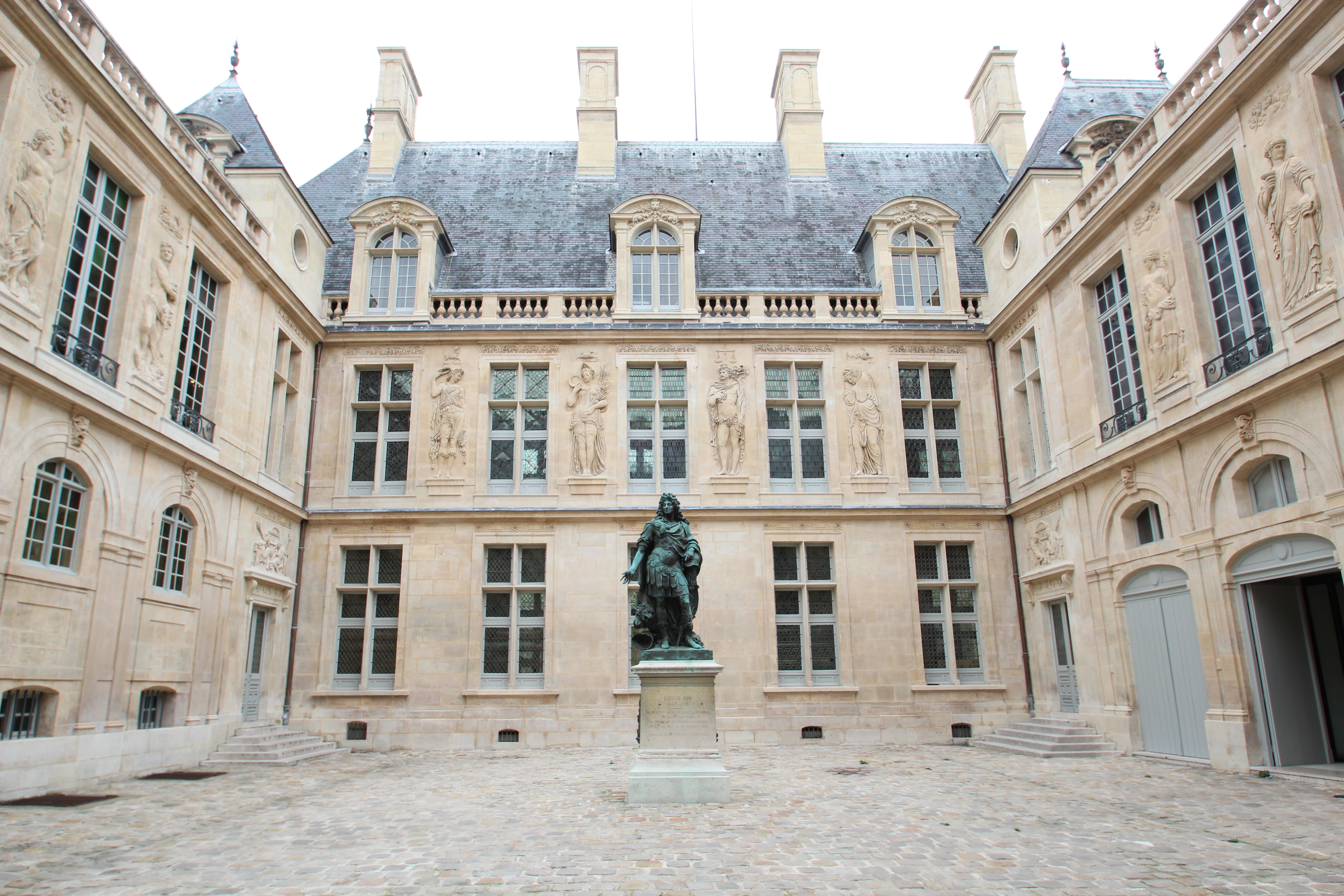
The Courtyard of Louis XIV

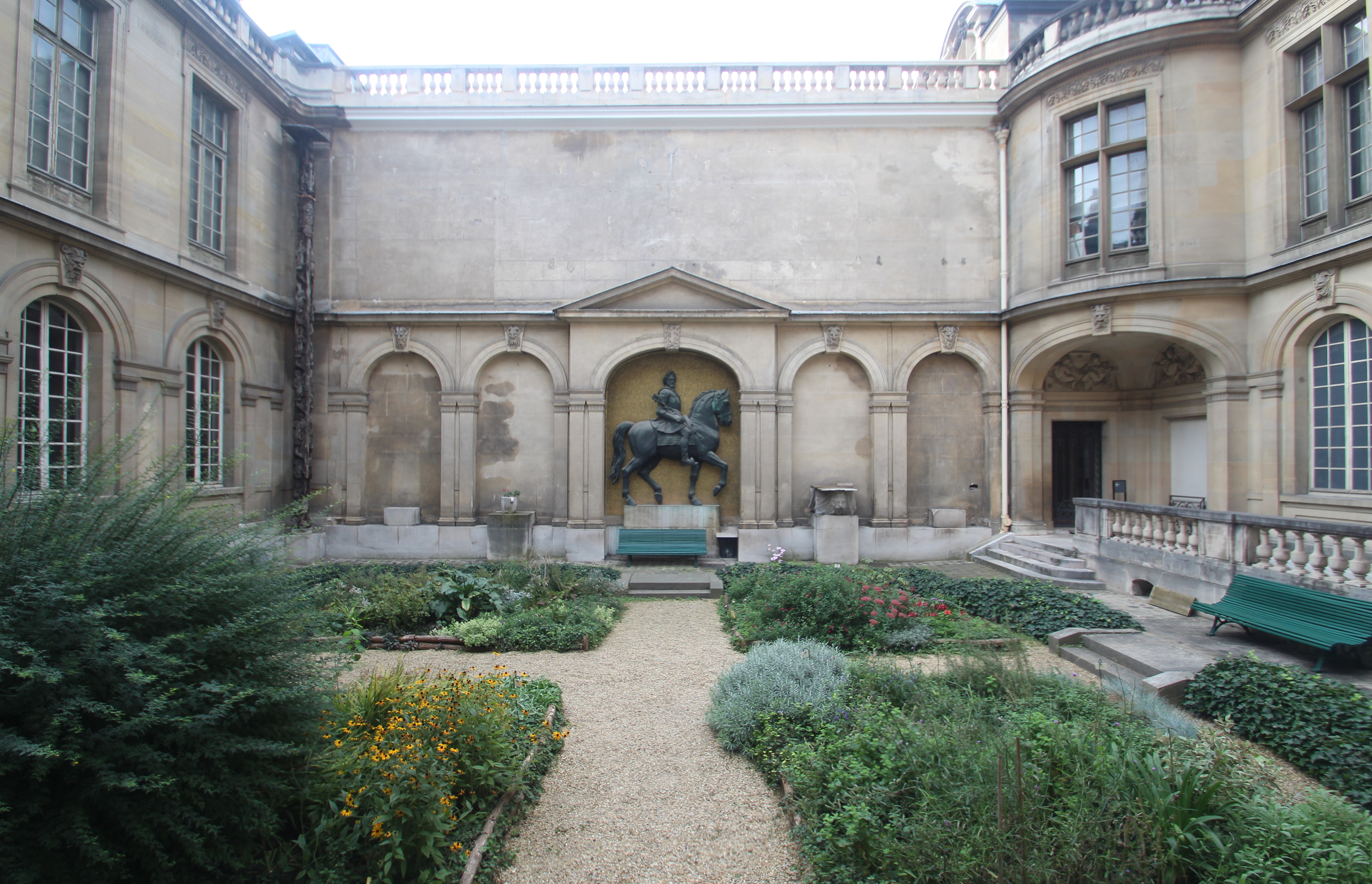
Courtyard of Henry IV
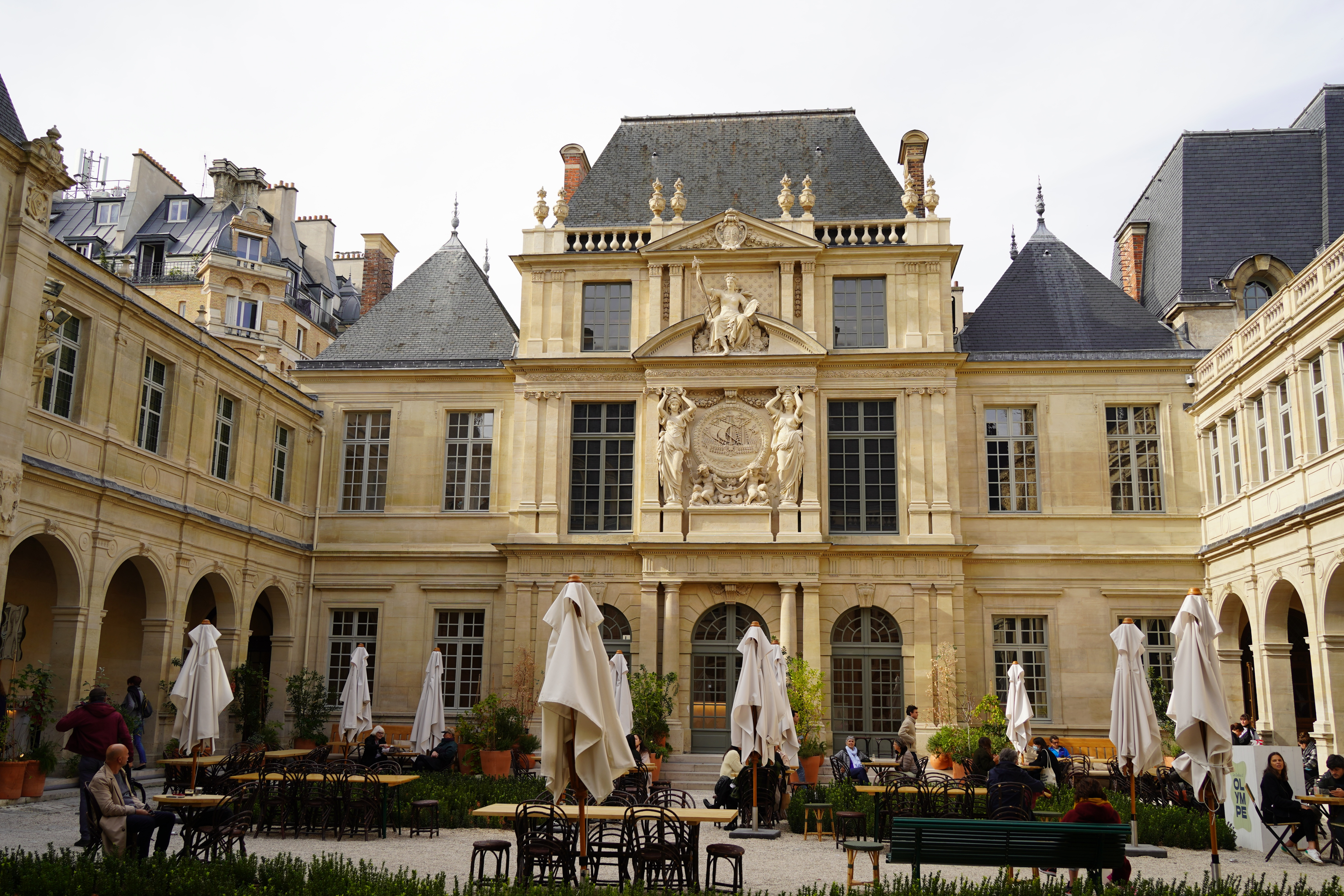
Facade facing the Courtyard of Drapers, formerly the offices of the Guild of Drapers, or cloth-workers

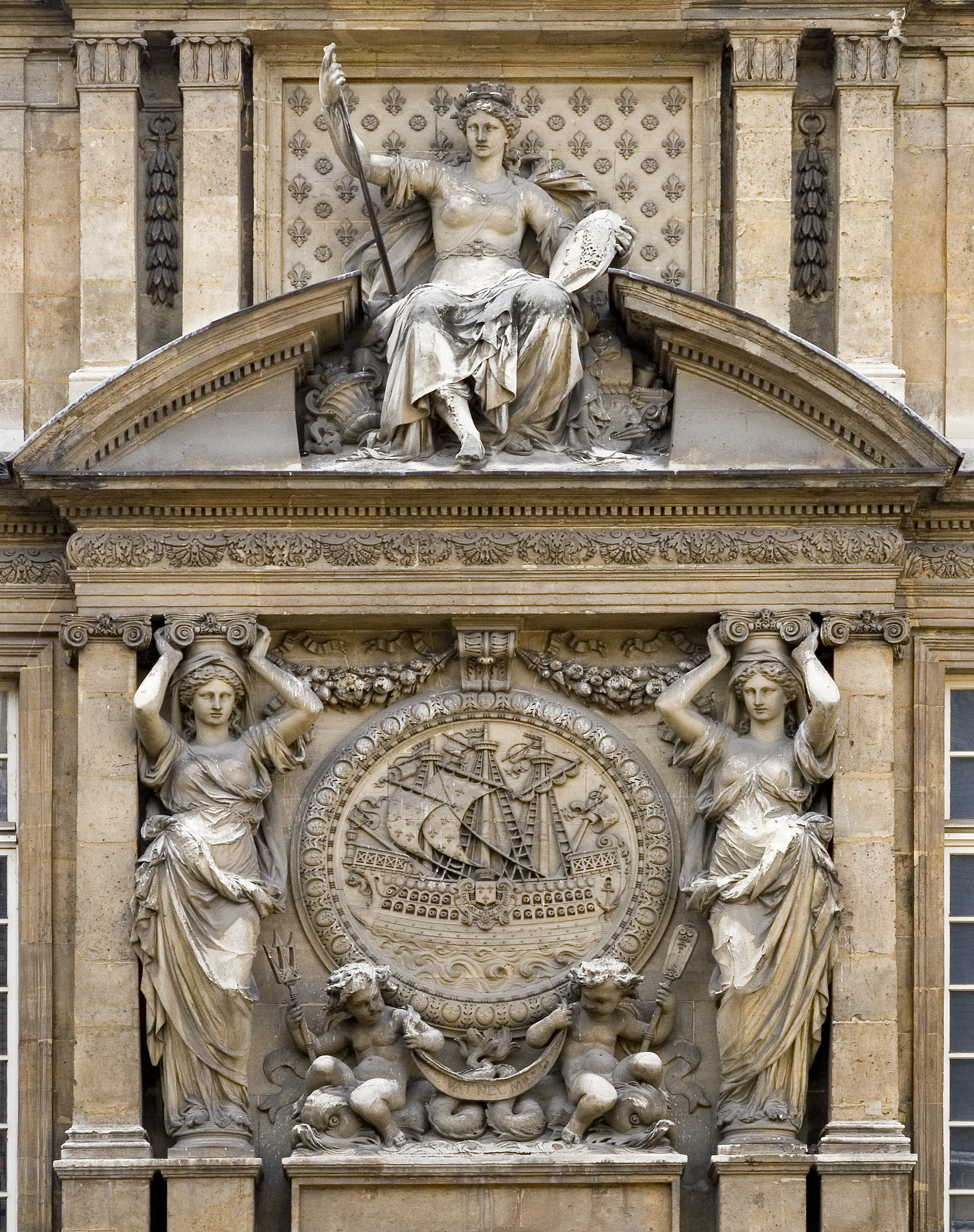
Detail of the facade facing the Cour de Drapers

=== Exterior sculpture ===
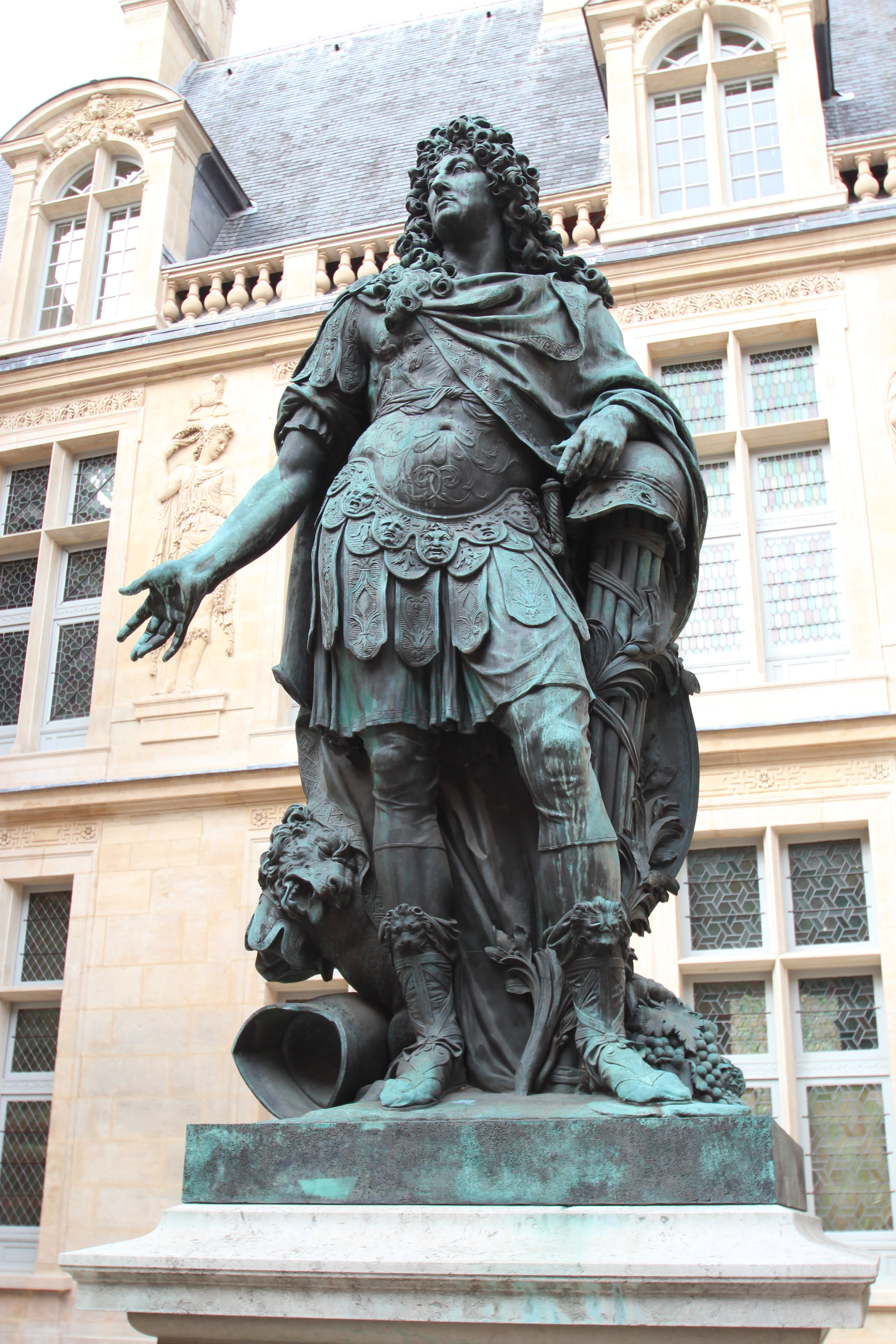
"Louis XIV in the costume of a Roman Emperor" by Antoine Coysevox

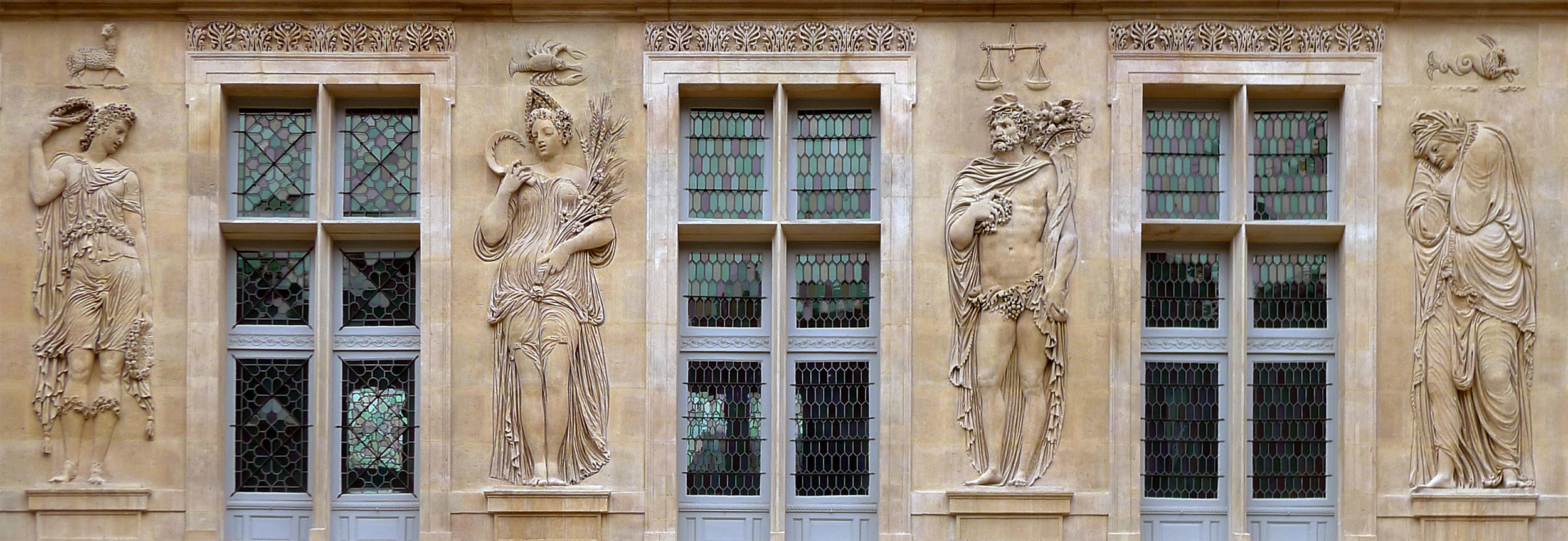
Bas-reliefs by Jean Goujon and his workshop (16th c.), depicting the Four Seasons.

The statue of Louis XIV in the costume of a Roman emperor, is one of the very few images of him which survived the French Revolution. It was made by sculptor Antoine Coysevox and depicts the King in the costume of a Roman emperor. Before the French Revolution it was placed before the Hotel de Ville, and was moved to the museum in 1890.

The facade features a statue of "Immortality" by Louis-Simon Boizot. During the Revolution, Boizot was a member of the Commission des Monuments in 1792. From 1805 he was a professor at the Academie des Beaux-Arts, where, among other works, he executed the sculpture for the Fontaine du Palmier erected in the Place du Châtelet, Paris. The gilded "Victory" was the centrepiece of the fountain, and celebrated Napoleon's triumphant return from Egypt. It was finished in 1806, and placed atop a column with sphinxes spouting water at the base. The statue on display at the Carnavalet is the original model of "Immortality", holding olive wreaths in both hands.

== Collections ==
Collections of Musée Carnavalet

The current collections on display are presented within the two 17th-century residences, the Hôtels Carnavalet and Le Pelletier de Saint-Fargeau. Some rooms have their original decoration intact, while others have been recreated with furnishing and decoration of a certain period. They include furnished rooms from historic residences from the 16th, 17th, 18th, 19th and 20th centuries. The displays cover 3900 square meters, laid out in eight "parcourses" or sequences of rooms from different periods.

=== Lutetia, Prehistory and Antiquity ===
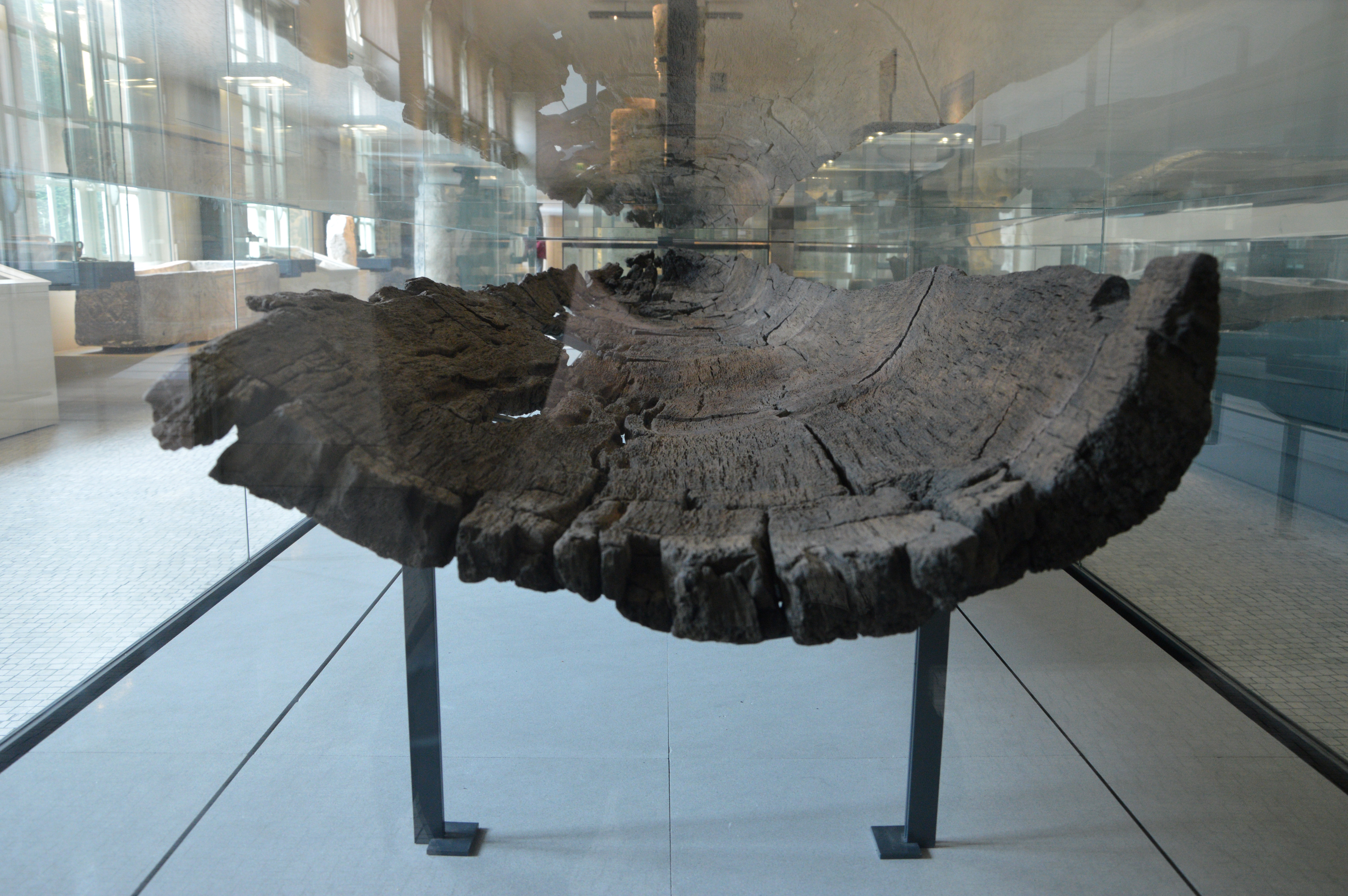
Neolithic pirogue made from a single tree (about 2700 BC)

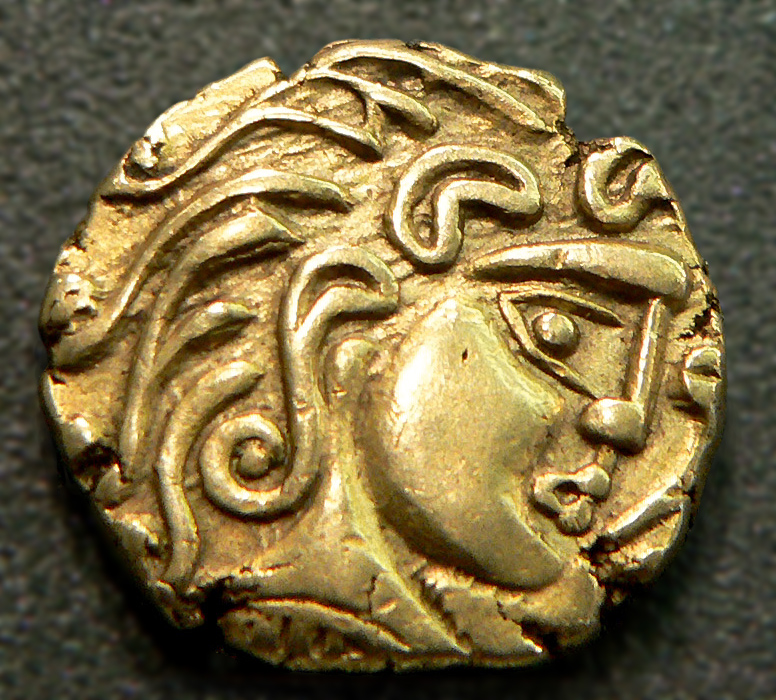
Gold coin of the Parisii (between 50 and 100 BC)

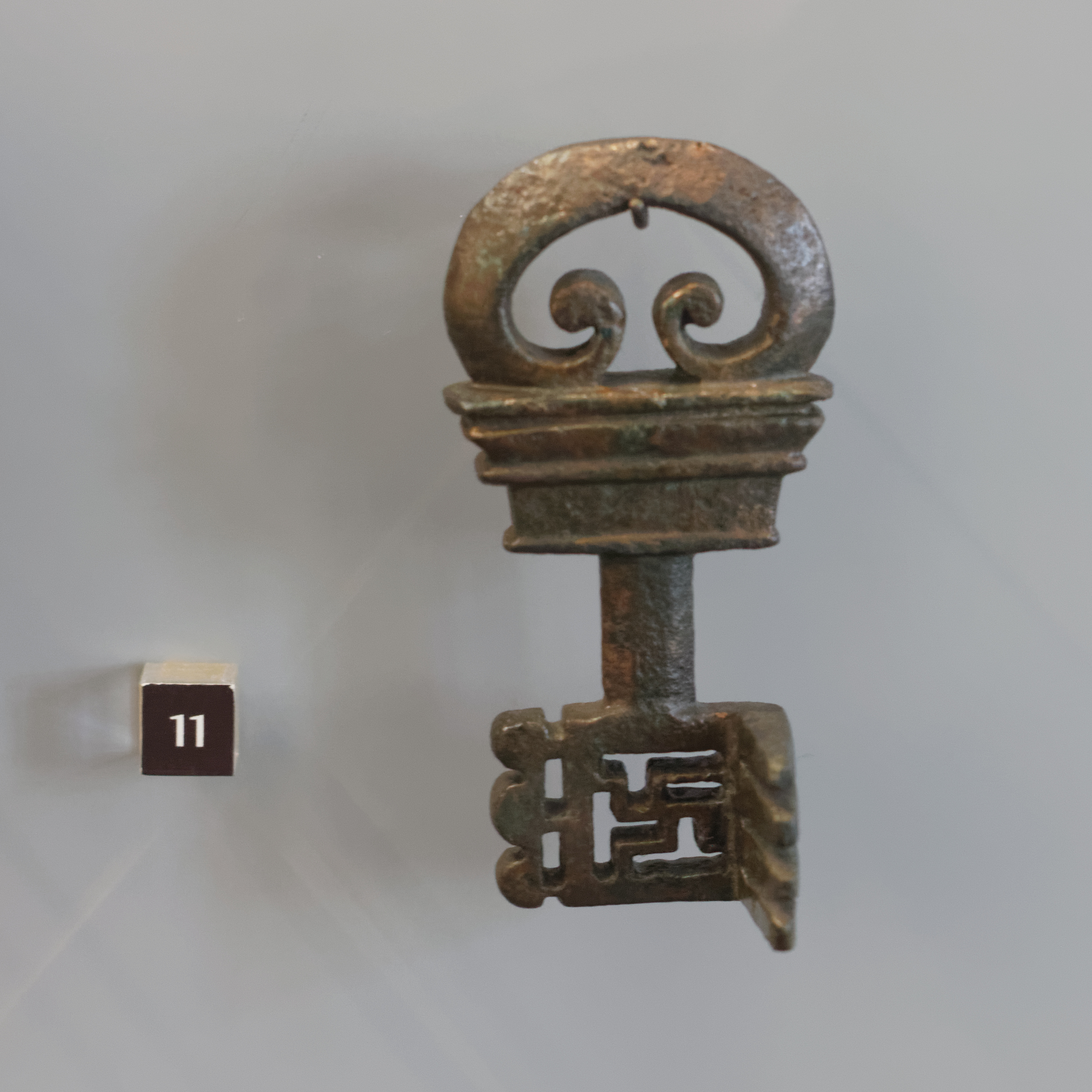
A bronze key from Gallo-Roman Lutetia

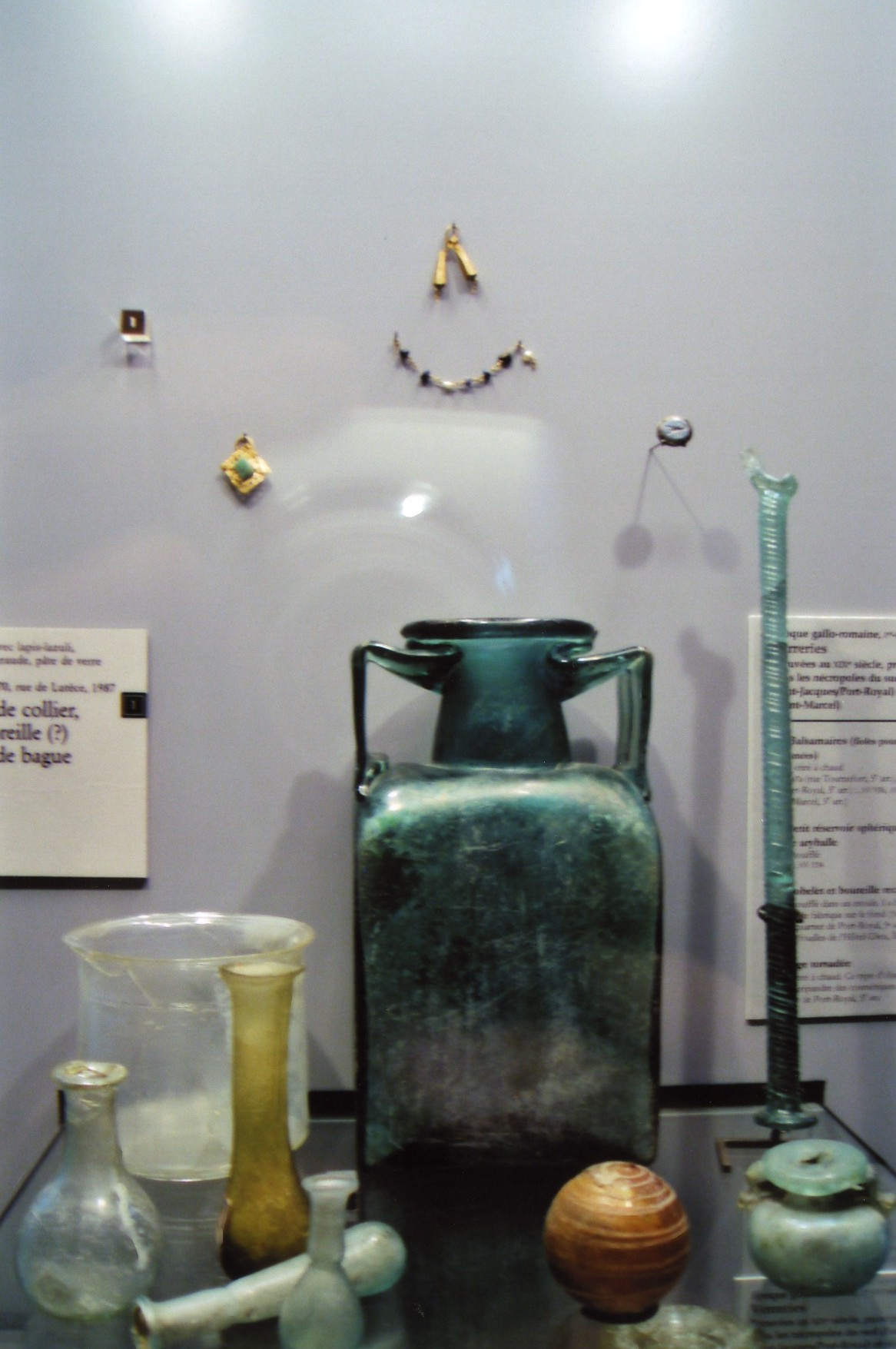
Objects from Gallo-Roman daily life

On its lowest level (Rooms S1-S6) the museum displays an extensive collection of art and practical objects recovered from neolithic sites and from the ancient Gallo-Roman of Lutetia. The gallery also displays objects found in the 1990s at the first permanent settlement known in Paris, in the neighbourhood of Bercy. This discovery included objects related to agriculture, fishing, and raising livestock, dated to 6500–4500 BC.

Discoveries on display include a whole pirogue, or long, narrow canoe made from a single tree trunk. It dates to about 2700 BC, during the Neolithic period. It was discovered in the early 1990s, along with several other pirogues that were even older, at a site located near the modern Rue Henri-Farman in the 19th arrondissement, on what was then a channel of the Seine. Other items on display from this period include earthenware cooking pots, early ceramics, wooden tools, necklaces of otter teeth, and carved female figures. They date back long before the first written description of the village in 52 BC in Julius Caesar's De bello Gallico.

During the Bronze Age a Gallic people called the Parisii settled in the area and founded Lutetia. Its location is traditionally held to be on the Île de la Cité, but their presence is not documented on the left bank of the Seine before the 1st century BC, when Julius Caesar recorded his visit to their leaders on the Île de la Cité. Early coins minted by the Parisii are also displayed, dating to between 90 and 60 BC, with a masculine head in profile, and a horse on the reverse. The coins were used in the extensive river commerce of the Parisii on European rivers. Following the Roman conquest of Gaul by Julius Caesar in 52 BC, the minting of the coins as stopped.

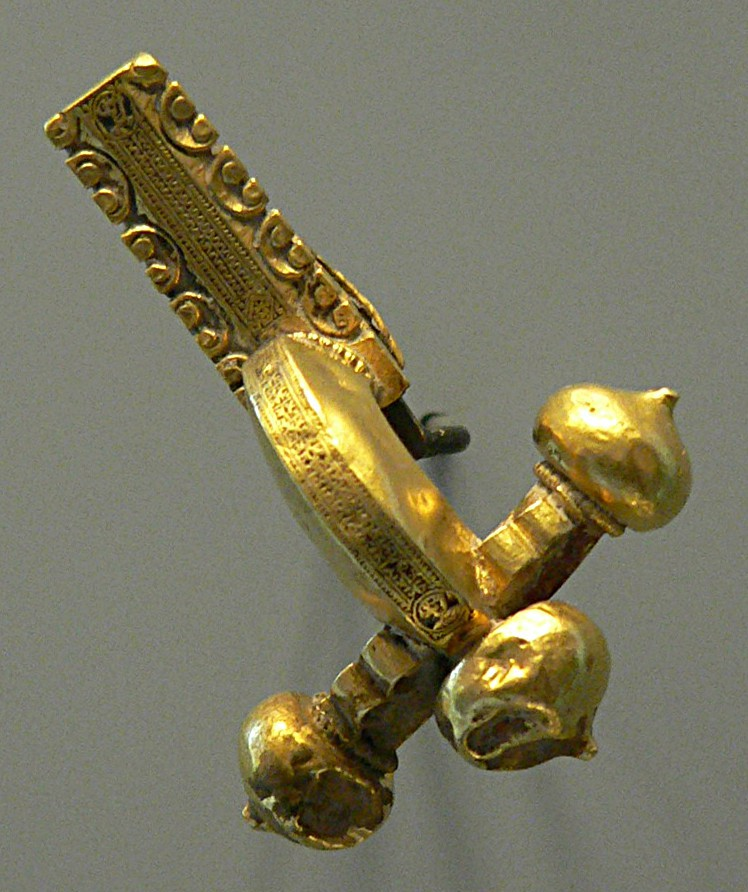
A cruciform Roman fibula, or buckle from Lutetia

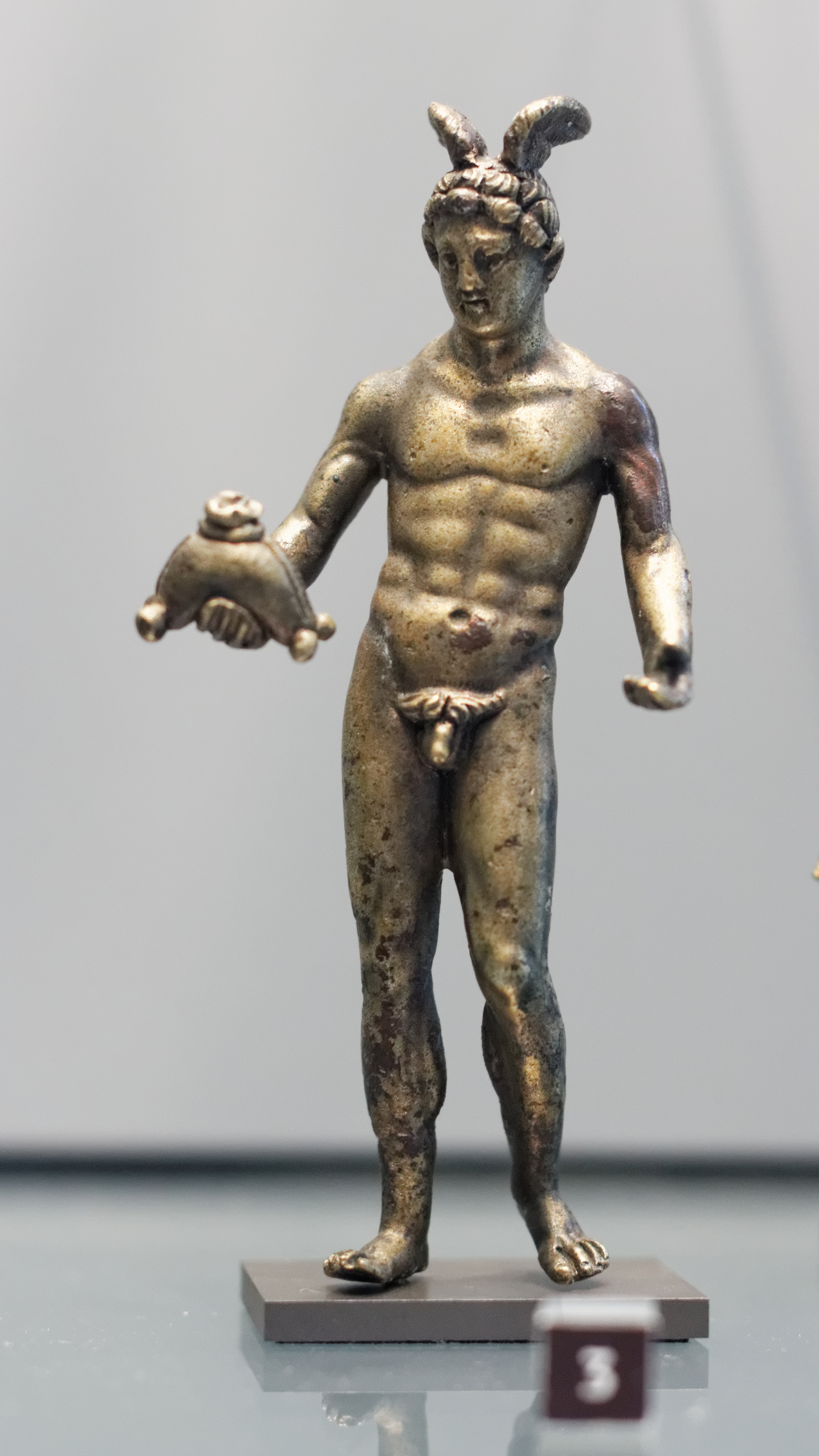
Cast and chiseled bronze statue of Mercury (2nd century AD), found in Luxembourg Garden in 1867

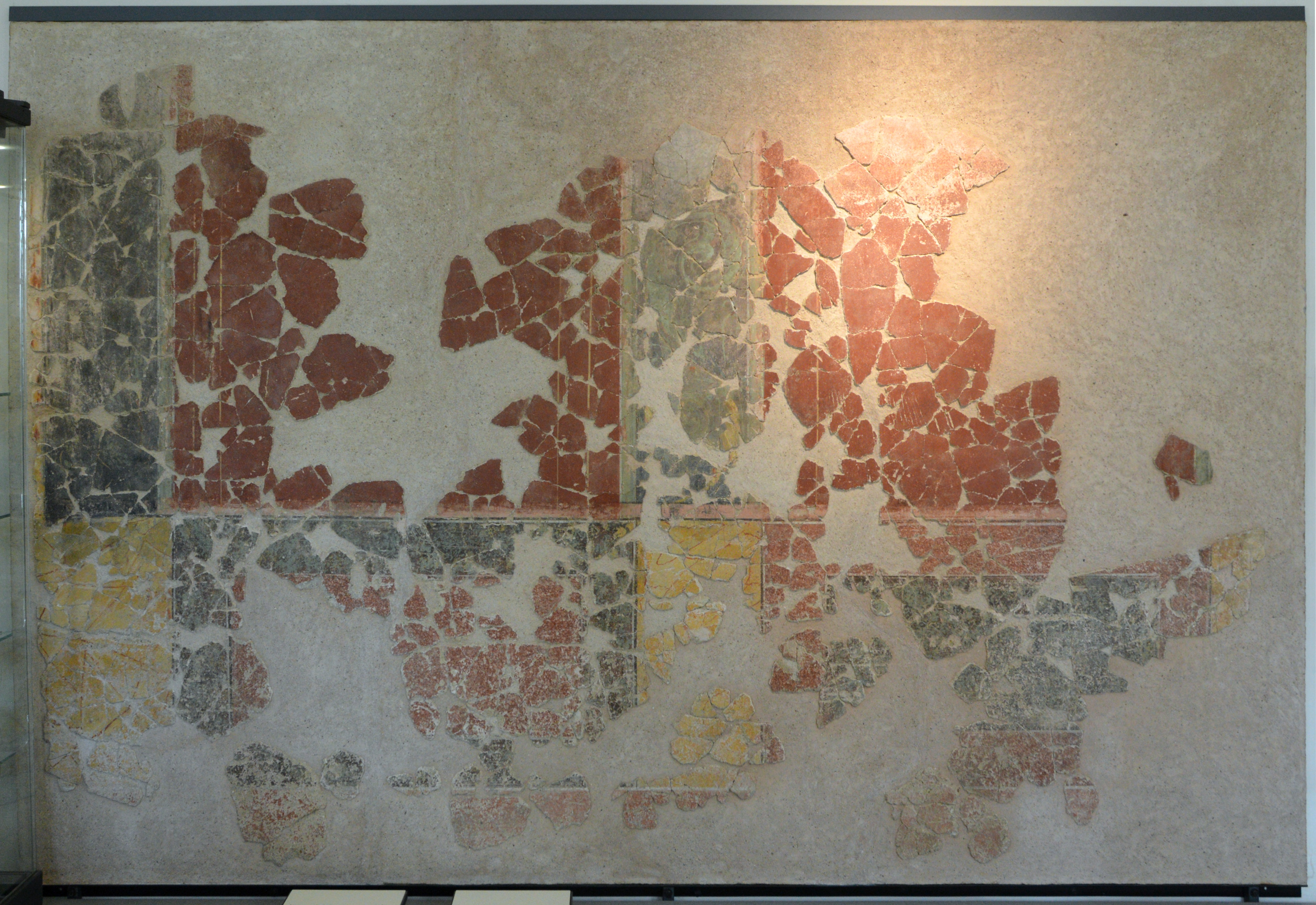
Remains of a Gallo-Roman mural (2nd century)

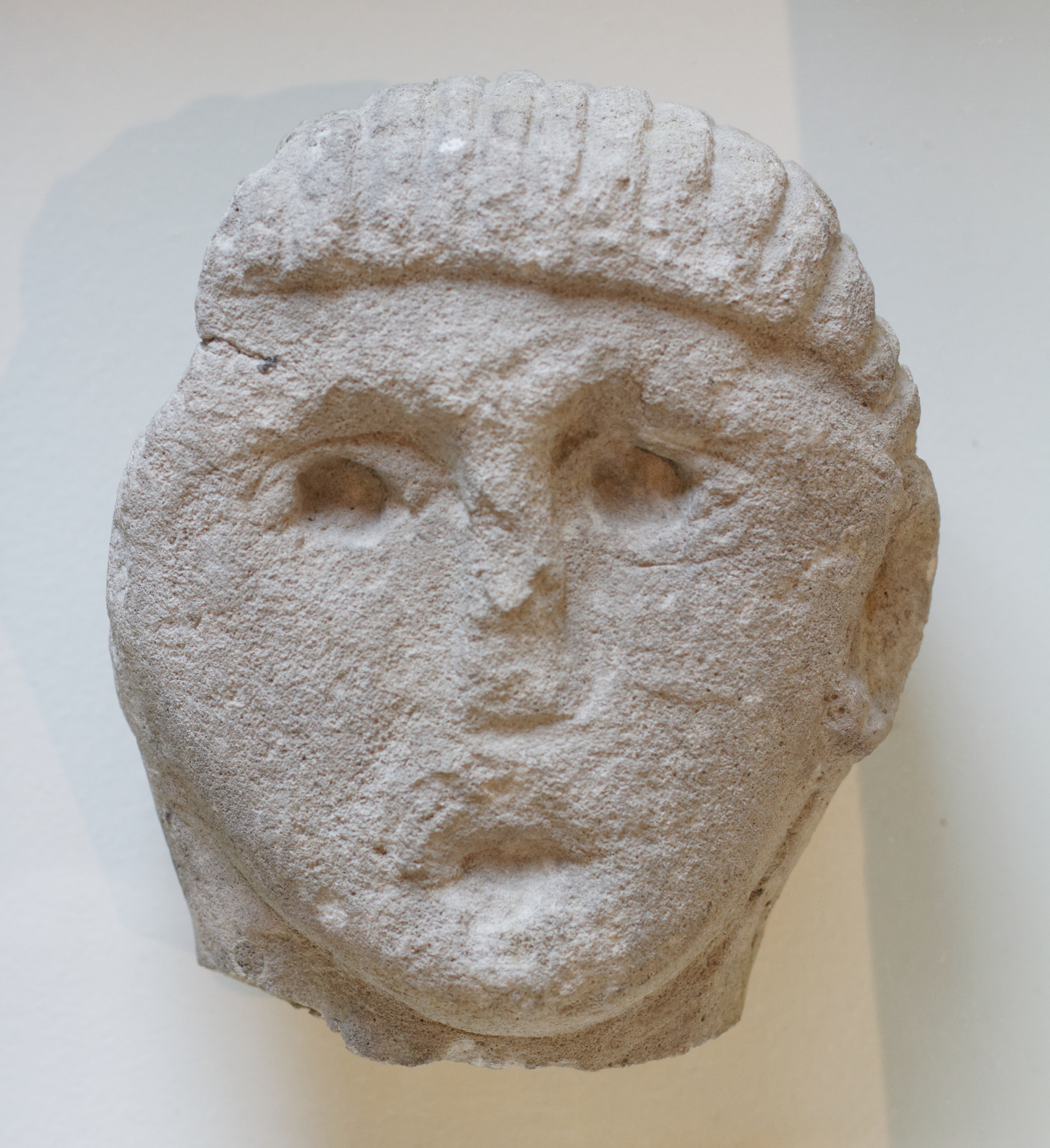
Head of statue with an oak crown found near the amphitheater of Lutece, probably representing a member of the royal family or a god (2nd century AD)

Following the Roman conquest in the 1st century BC, Lutetia was centred on the left bank, occupying an area of about 130 hectares. Like other Roman cities, it was constructed around the intersection of north–south road (now Rue Saint -Jacques) and an east–west road (now Rue Cujas). Nearby was the amphitheater, near Rue Monge and still present, in much-modified form; and the Forum, at Rue Soufflot, where the government buildings were located. The Roman port was on the Ile-de-la-Cité, and there was a smaller settlement on the right bank of the Seine. Extensive excavations in the 19th century uncovered the paved streets; three large Roman baths; and residences. A group of sculpted heads are on display, which were discovered near the state of the Roman amphitheater in Paris in 1885. The statues had oak crowns, and represented either gods, or the Imperial family.

Two large Roman necropoles, or cemeteries, proved a particularly rich source of discoveries for the museum. The southern cemetery, the Necropole of Pierre Nicole, near Val-de-Grace, was the most important under the High Empire, and was used until the fourth century AD. The excavations there between 1870 and 1970, uncovered some four hundred sepulchres, with furniture, sculpture and inscriptions. The Necropole of the Gobelins, in the Faubourg Saint-Marcel, was smaller, and was used in the later, or Low Empire. The most valuable discovery there was a set of surgical instruments dating from the second century AD.

The excavations of the amphitheater site were particularly meticulous; they were directed by Thèodore Vacquer, who became under-conservator of the Carnavalet Museum in 1870. One especially important discovery by Vacquer was the fresco on the wall of the house of a wealthy Roman, with colors still largely vivid, discovered under the current rue de l'Abbaye-de-l'Épée. Other objects discovered include a sword from the Bronze Age (2000–800 B.C.); a fourth-century bottle used for perfume, wine, or honey.

=== Medieval to Renaissance Paris (5th–16th century) ===
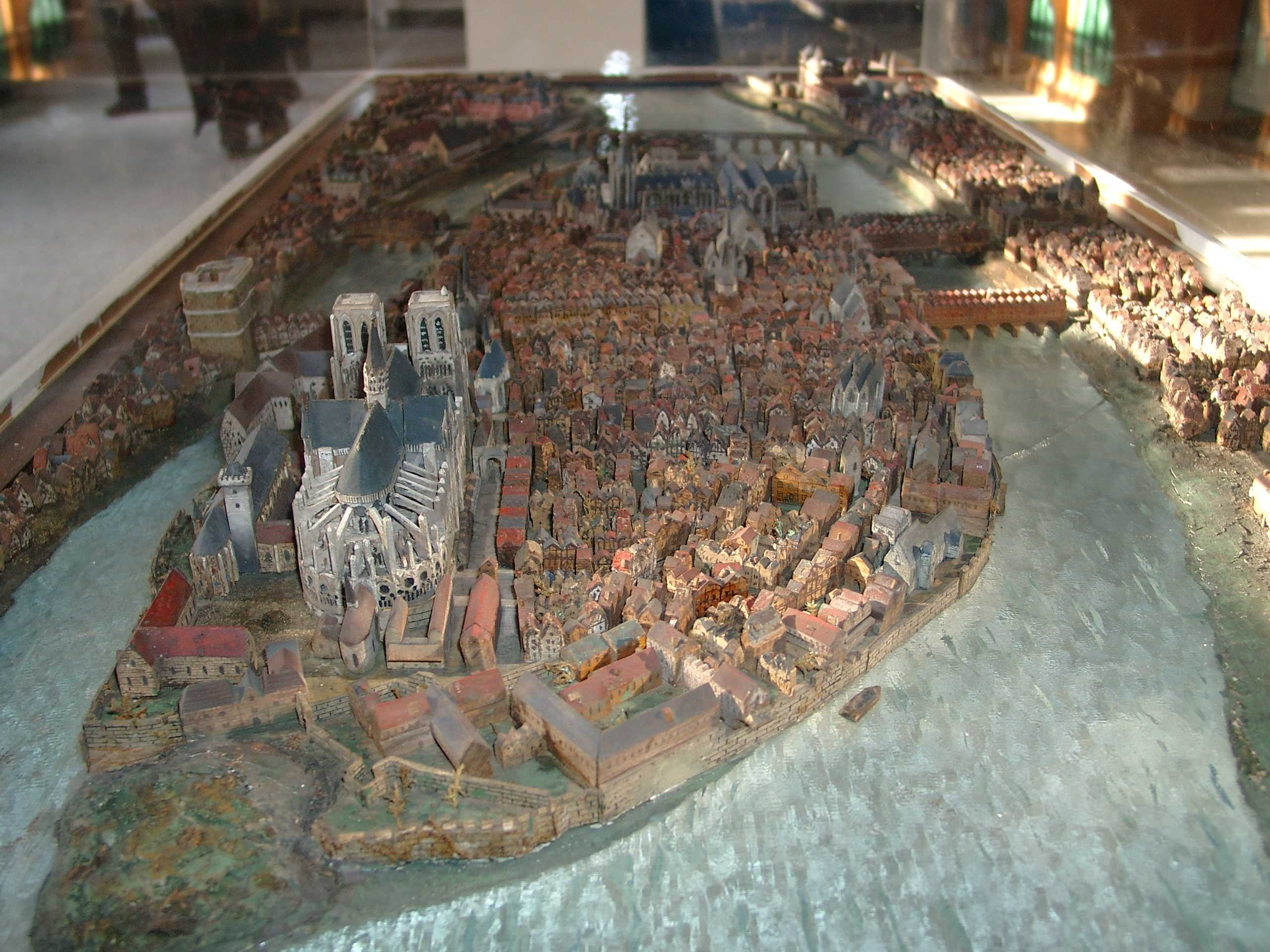
Scale model of the Île de la Cité in the 16th century

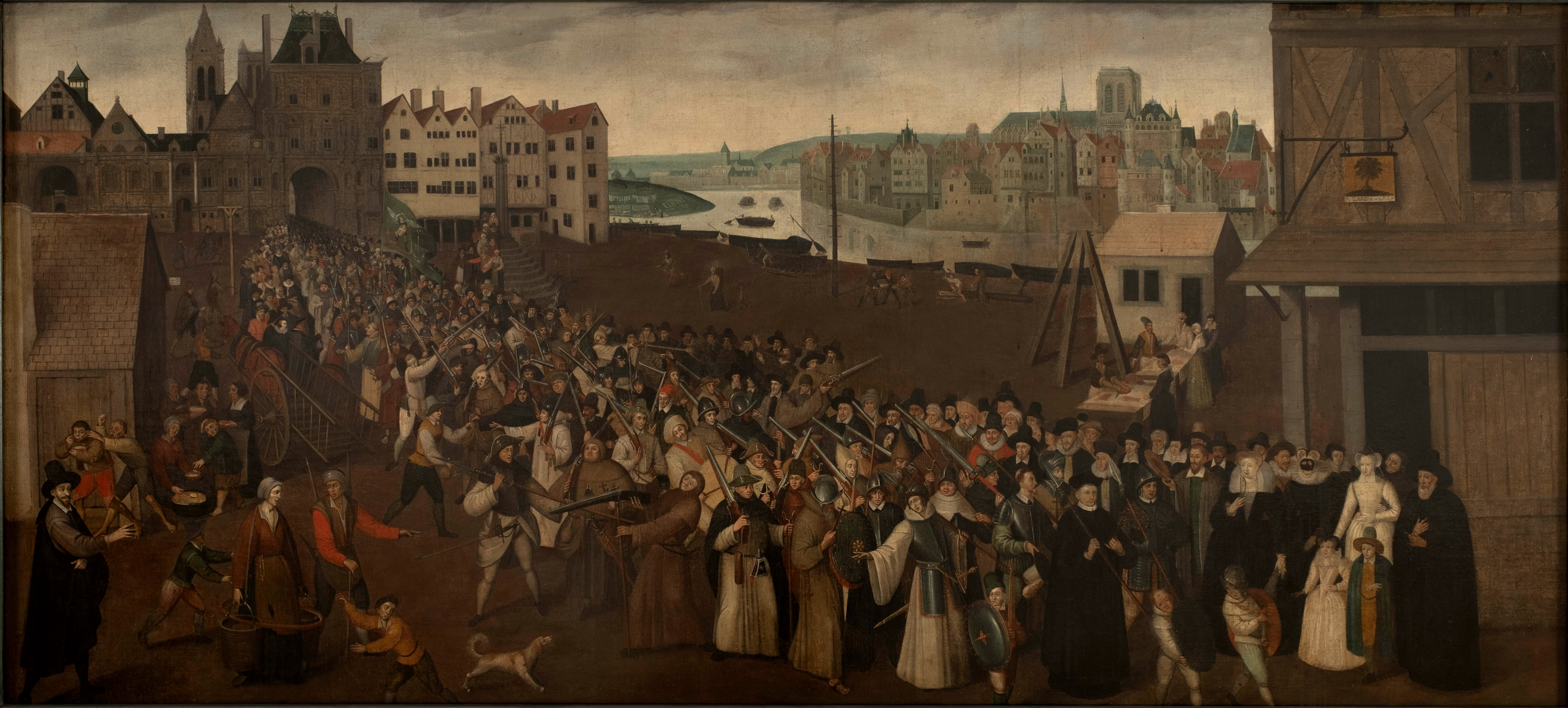
Procession of the League, an anti-Protestant movement, in 1590

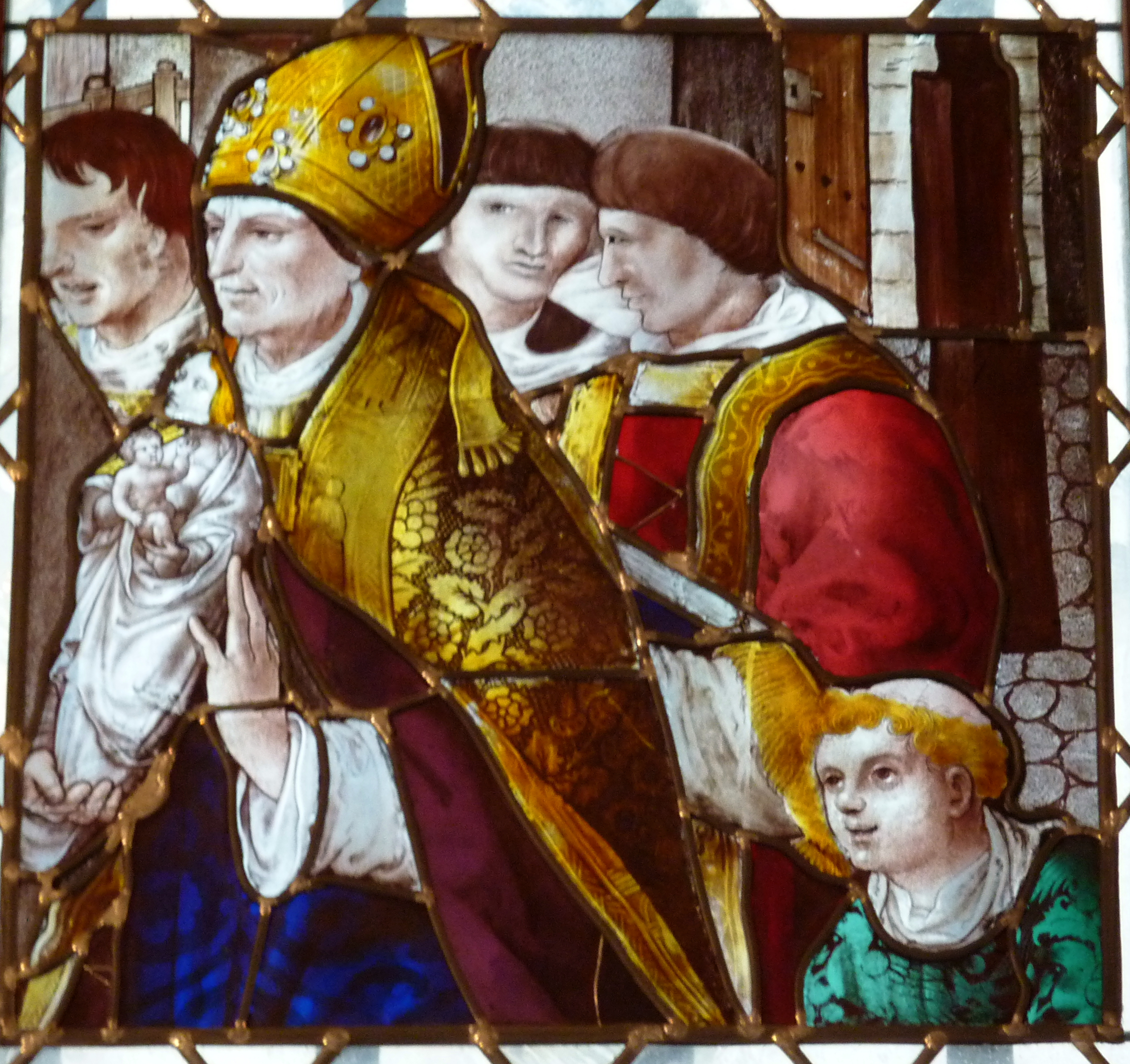
Fragment of Stained glass originally from the church of Saint-Gervais-Saint-Protais (16th century)

The Medieval and Renaissance section (Lower Level, Salles S-7 to S-9) presents displays and objects from the 5th to 16th century, beginning in 451 AD, when Saint Genevieve inspired the resistance of the city against Attila and Huns. In 481, under Clovis, King of the Franks, she became the patron Saint of Paris. Her tomb, placed in the new Basilica of the Holy Apostles on what is now Mount Sainte-Genevieve, This church became the beginning point of an annual procession to the Île de la Cité. This island became administrative center of the Kingdom of France, the home of the royal palace, the Palais de la Cité, and the cathedral of Notre Dame de Paris, which was consecrated 1163. During this period, the city grew rapidly. By 1328, at the beginning of the 14th century, the city had 250,000 inhabitants, making it the largest city in Europe.

During the restoration of the cathedral, carried out by Eugene Viollet-Le-Duc and Jean-Baptiste Antoine Lapsus between 1844 and 1864, important objects from the medieval city were discovered and made their way to the museum. The construction of the Palais de Justice and other administrative buildings on the island led to the destruction of many medieval buildings, including six churches. Objects from these churches are preserved in the museum. One of the prominent displays in this section is a scale mode of the Île de la Cité as it appeared in 1527. The model was made by the artist Fedor Hoffbauer and his son, Charles, between 1860 and 1870.

The section displays a collection of sculptural elements, including busts of Saints and apostles, that formerly belonged to the Church of the Saints-Innocents, which was demolished as the neighbourhood expanded. These include a well-preserved 14th-century sculpture of the head of the Virgin Mary, peaceful and contemplative, despite the tumultuous events that decimated the city at that time: the Hundred Years' War and the Great Plague of 1348 These statues were found in 1973 during the excavation of a new shopping and convention center, the Forum of Les Halles, on the site of the historic city produce market.

The gallery also displays a group of six stained glass windows, originally in the chapel of the College of Dormans-Beauvais, built in 1375 by the architect Raymond du Temple. They are attributed to Baudoin de Soissons and the painter Jean de Bruges.

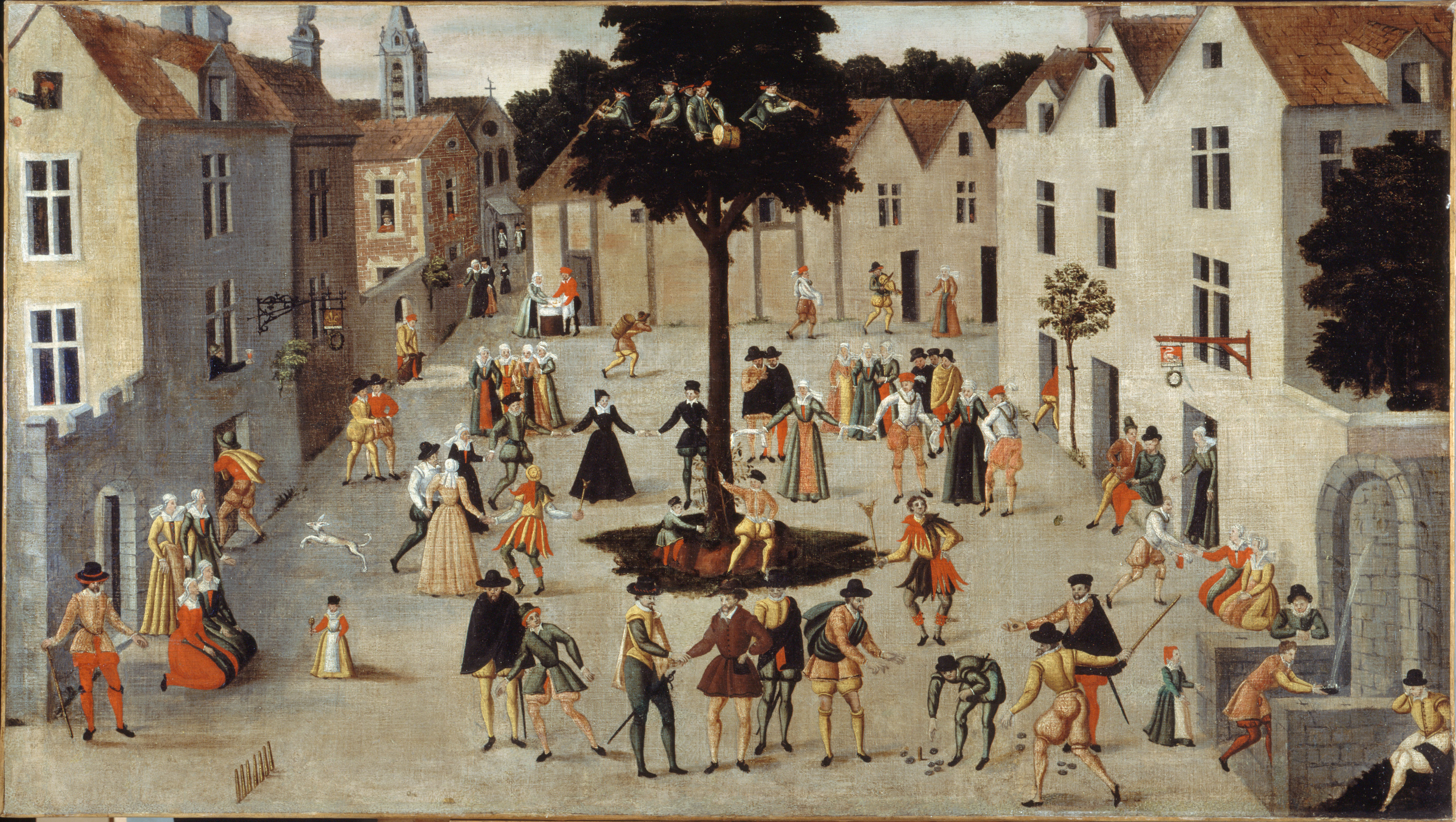
A street festival in Paris in 1560

Objects in the galleries include:

- An ornate chest from the 13th century, which probably came from the royal Abbey of Saint Denis
- Paintings from the 16th century depicting famous men and women of the time, including Francis I, Catherine de' Medici, and Henry IV.

=== The Paris of Henry IV and Louis XIV (late 16th–17th century) ===
The end of the 16th century saw Paris divided during the French Wars of Religion (1562–1598), then rebuilt by a series of strong monarchs. New institutions emerged, including the guild of Paris merchants and the municipal magistrates. Henry IV of France (reigned 1589–1601) began major new urban construction projects; the Louvre was gradually transformed from a medieval fortress into a sprawling palace, connected to the Tuileries Palace. Grand new royal squares were created at Place Dauphine and the Place Royale, now Place des Vosges. The Pont Neuf was constructed over the Île de la Cité, adding a major link between the two banks of the Seine

In his urban planning, Louis XIV promised to "Do for Paris what Augustus did for Rome." Among his many projects, he completed the Cour Carré of the Louvre, imagined by Henry IV, and created two grand royal squares, Place des Victoires and Place Louis-Le-Grand (now Place Vendôme. In 1670 he tore down old city walls and gates and replaced them with four triumphal arches, of which two, at Porte Saint-Martin and Porte Saint-Denis, still remain.

The squares and palaces of Paris were decorated with monumental sculpture of the Kings. Most of these were destroyed during the Revolution, but fragments of the original monumental statue of Henry IV on the Pont Neuf are on display in this section of the museum, as well as pieces of the statue of Louis XV that formerly stood in the Place de la Concorde.

Louis XIV founded the royal workshops for cabinet-making, tapestries and other decorative items to furnish the royal palaces and the residences of wealthy Parisians. The Royal Academy of Painting and Sculpture was founded in Paris in 1648, during the regency of Anne of Austria. The Carnavalet Museum has many examples of the work of its students; furniture designed by cabinet-maker Andre-Charles Boulle, noted for its inlays of previous woods and metals, is found in this section. The painter Charles Le Brun, who primarily worked for Louis XIV, also decorated the homes of private clients. His decoration for two salons of the Hôtel La Rivière (Salles 1-13 and 1-124) made in 1652–55, was acquired to the Carnavalet in 1958.

=== The Enlightenment (18th century) ===
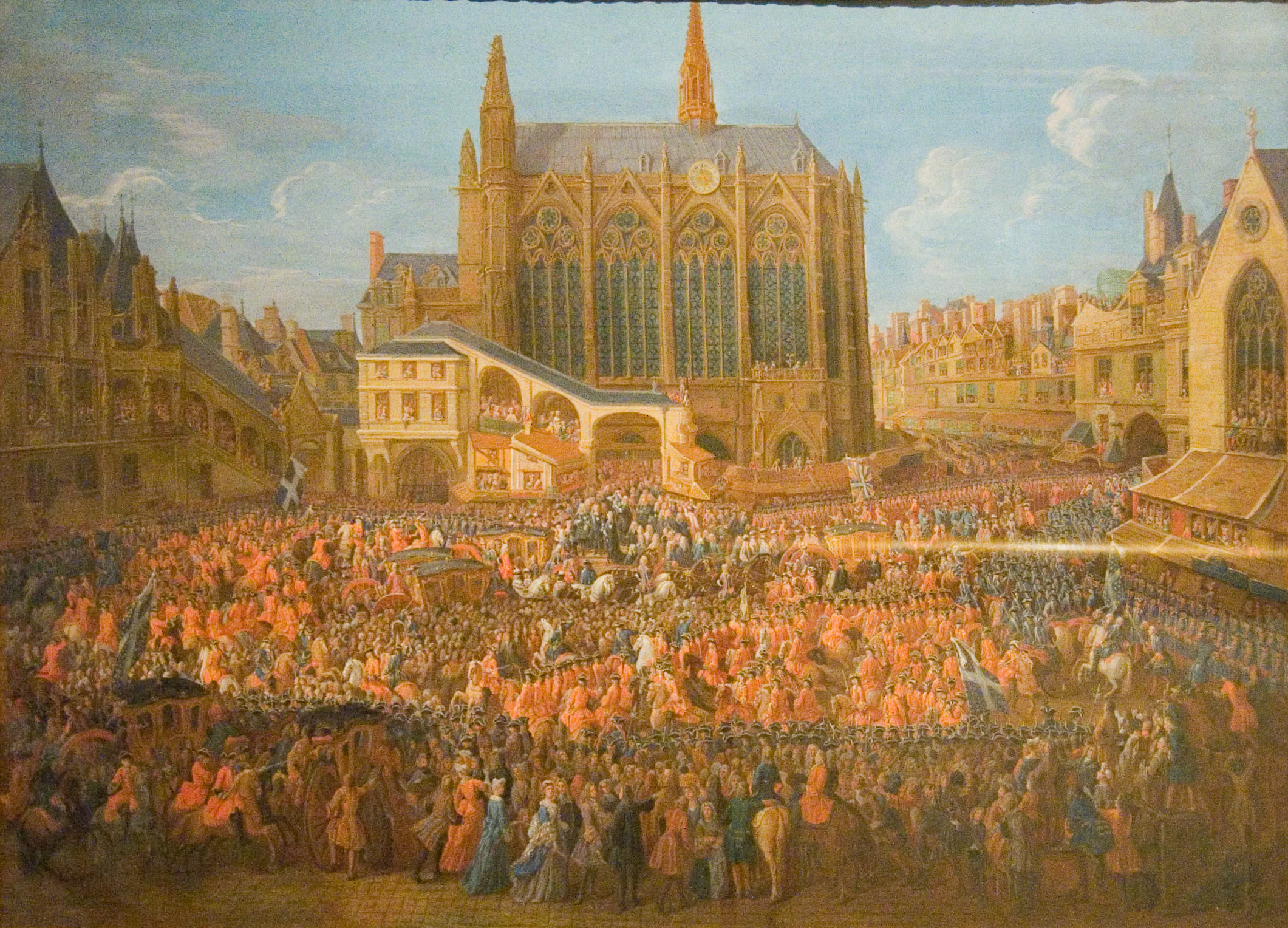
Louis XV departs a meeting of the Parlement of Paris at the Palais de la Cité, 1715

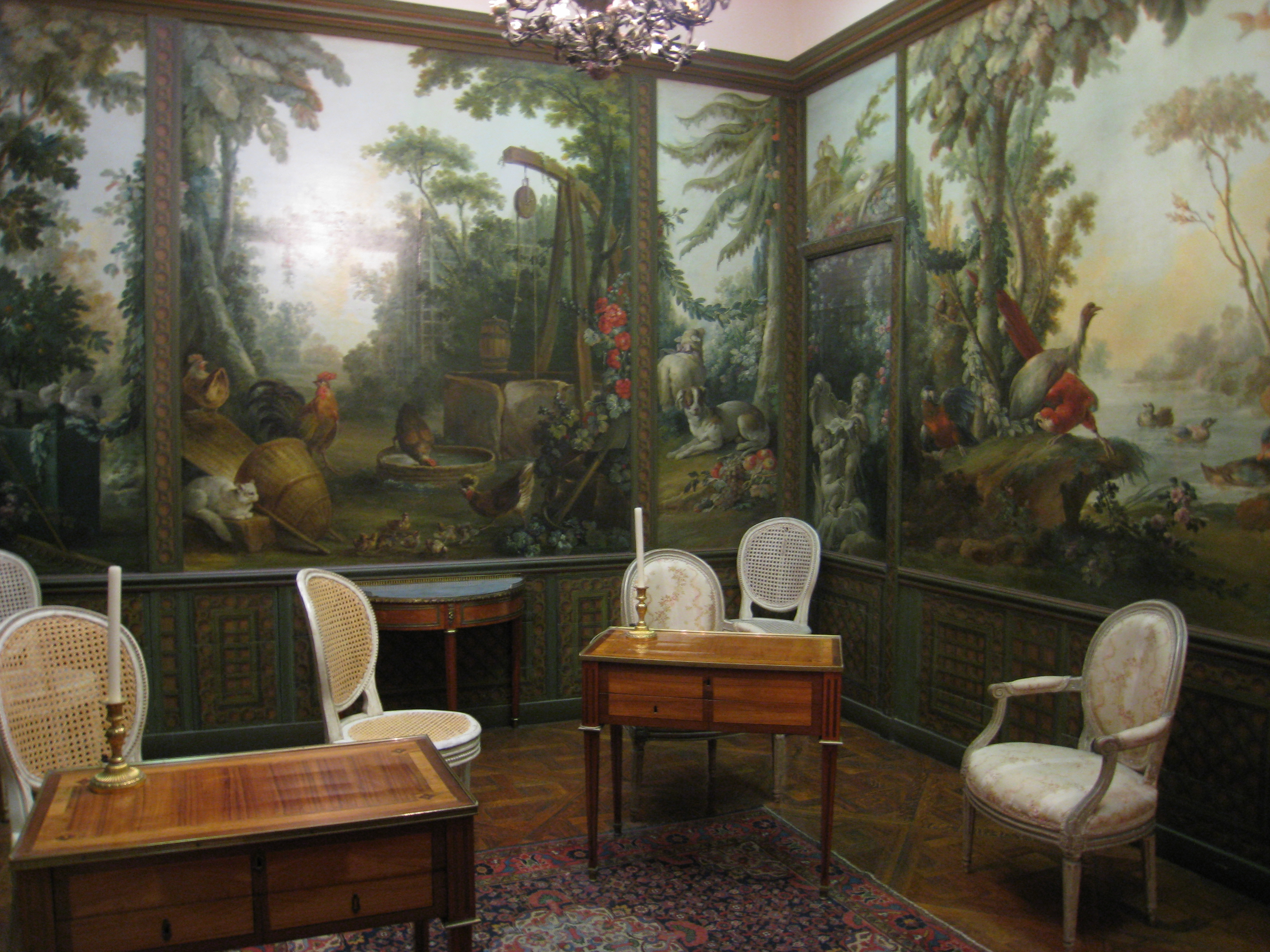
The Salon Demarteau by François Boucher (1765)

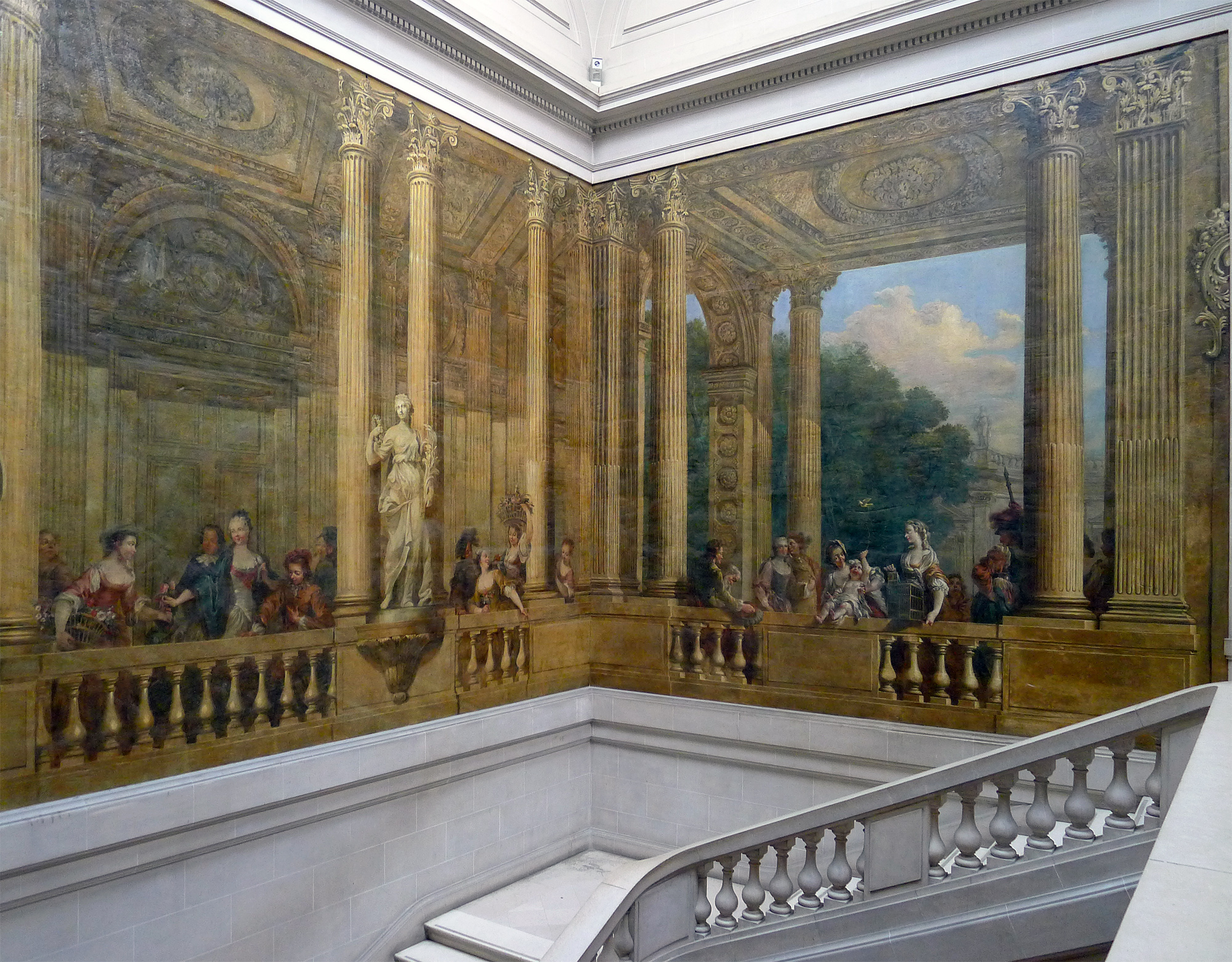
The stairway de Luynes (18th c.)

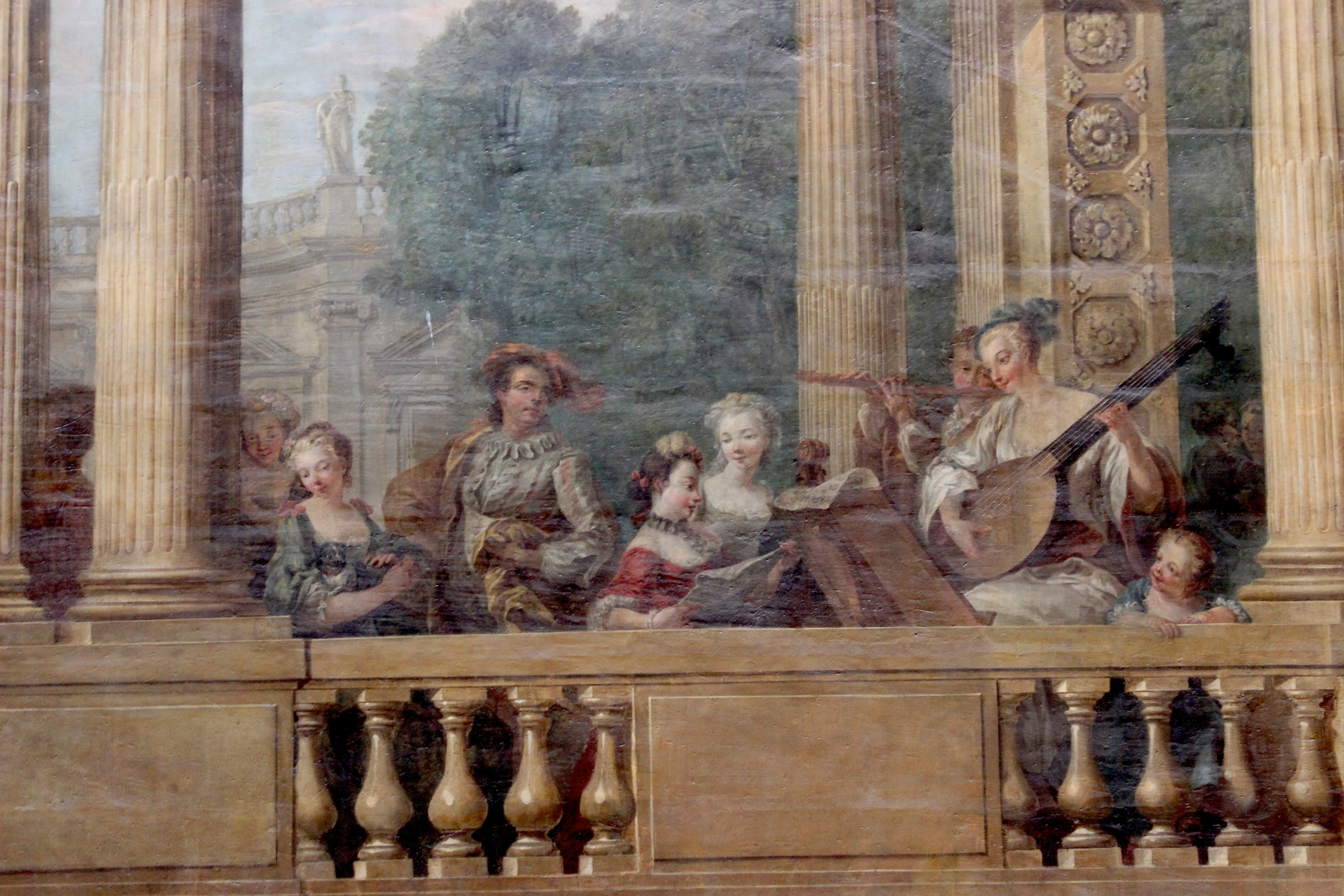
Detail of the stairway de Luynes, with life-size painted figures (18th century)

The Salon Demarteau is a masterpiece of 18th-century painting and design. It was originally made for the residence of the engraver Gilles Demarteau.It recreates a fantasy of an idyllic country scene, painted by François Boucher in 1765, with the assistance of two other prominent 18th century painters, Jean-Honoré Fragonard and the animal painter Jean-Baptiste Huet. After the death of Demarteau the decor was moved to other Paris residences, before being purchased by Musée Carnavalet.

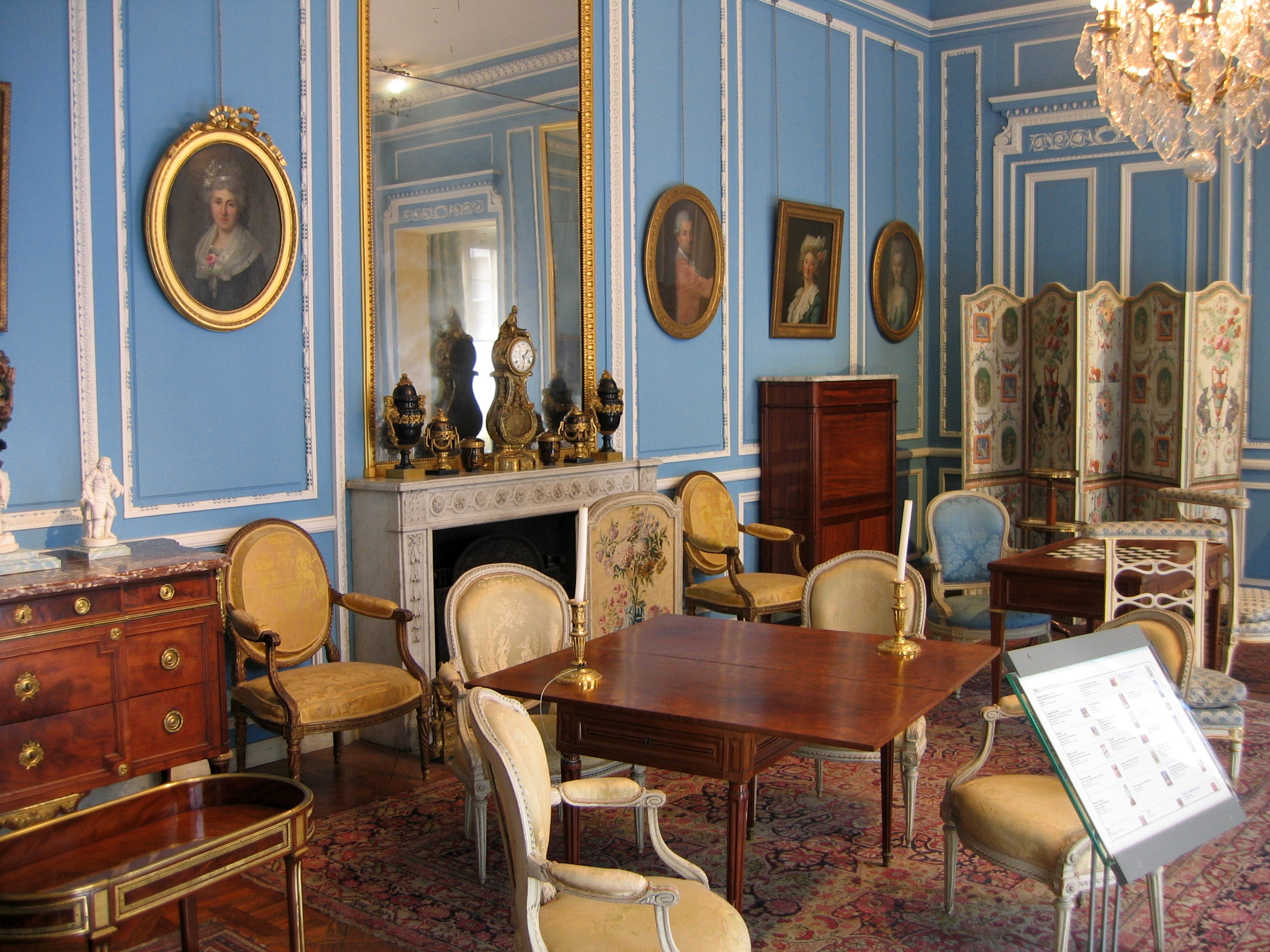
Salon of the Hôtel de Breteuil, in the Louis XVI style (18th c.)

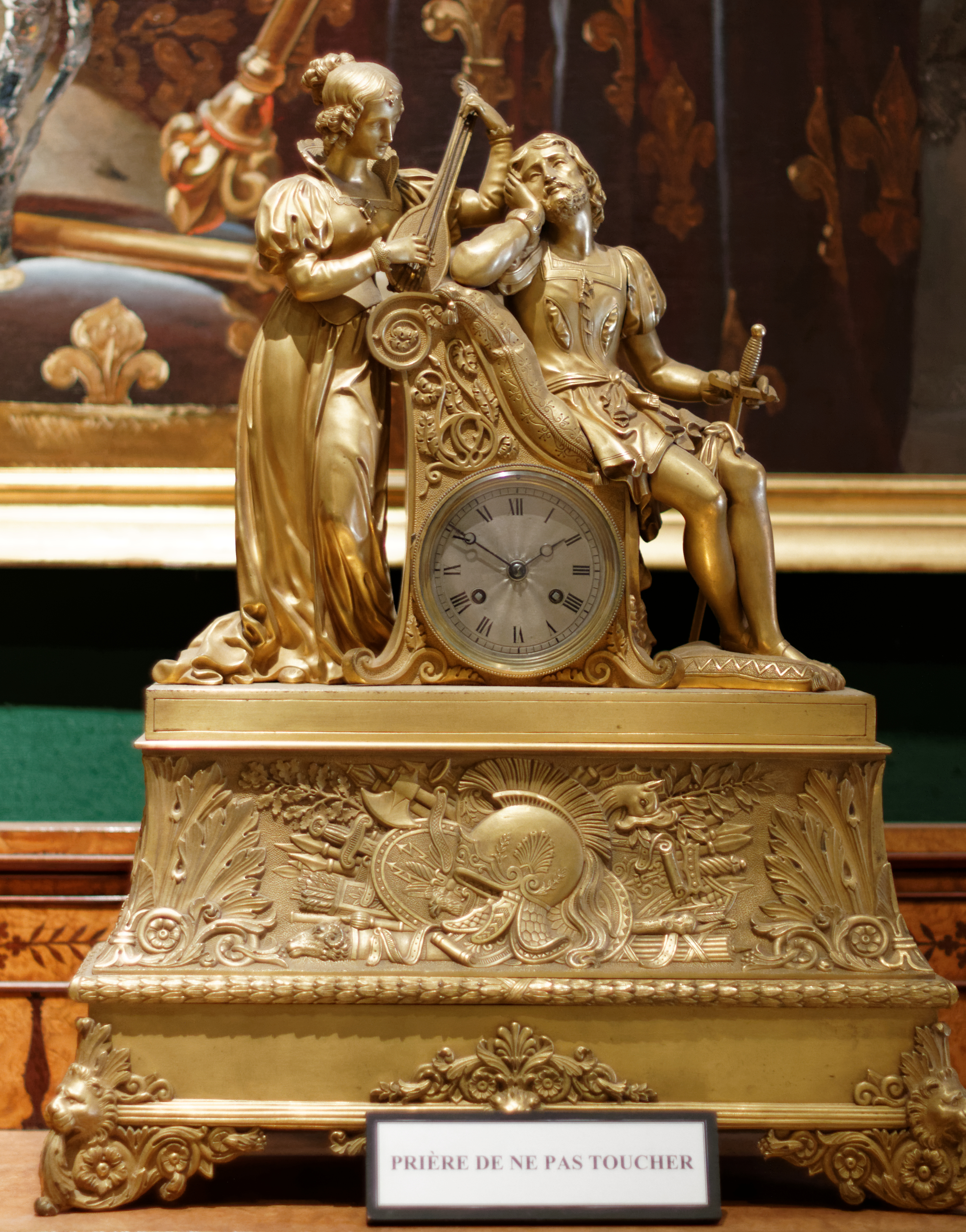
Troubador Clock (18th c.)

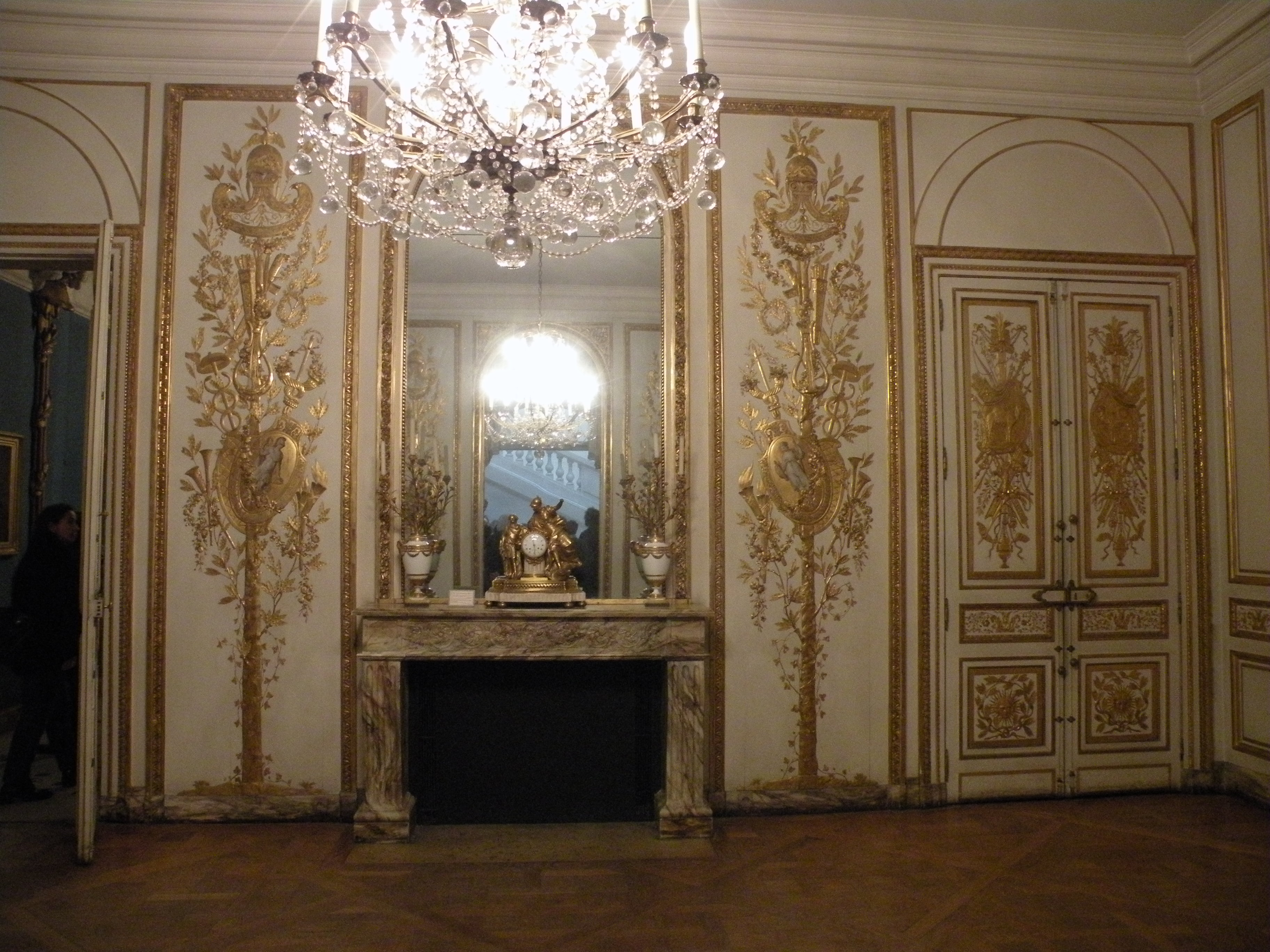
The Salon d'Uzès (1767)

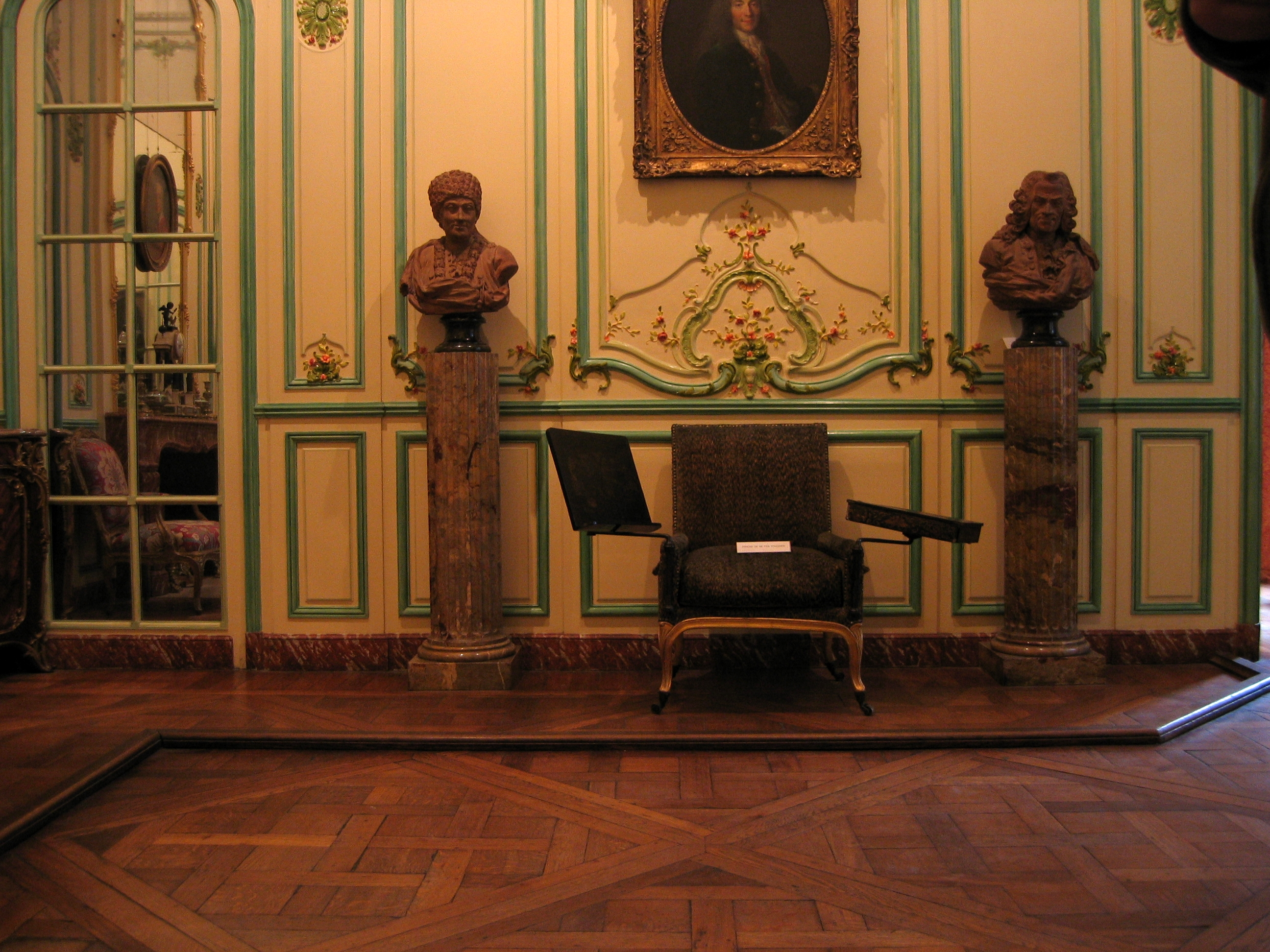
The armchair of Voltaire, where he spent his last hours, in the Salon of the residence of the Marquis de Villette

The museum displays two 18th-century rooms from the Hôtel de Breteuil, a large mansion on Rue Matignon, which was the residence of the Vicomte de Breteuil and his wife. It illustrates the height of the Louis XVI style, just before the French Revolution. The new style was characterised by symmetry, straight lines, and ornaments adapted from antiquity, such as acanthus leaves and egg-shaped designs.

The Salon d'Uzès (1767) was main room for entertaining company in the Hôtel d'Uzès, a mansion on rue Montmartre. It was designed by the architect Claude-Nicolas Ledoux, who planned the elaborate neoclassical woodwork made by Joseph Métivier and Jean-Baptiste Boiston. The woodwork is full of Greco-Roman symbols, including the sceptre and the lyre. Each of the four doors has a sculpted decoration of an animal representing a continent; an alligator for America, a camel for Africa, an elephant for Asia and a horse for Europe.

The Salon of Philosophers displays the armchair of the philosopher Voltaire. It was ordered for him by the Marquis de Vilette, in whose residence on the Quai de Conti Voltaire spent his last days before his death in February 1778. It was made of carved and gilded oak, with cushions of velour, and movable wooden and iron shelves for his books and papers. It could be rolled from room to room.

The cabinet of the Hôtel Colbert-de-Villacerf, preserved after that building was demolished, also represents the lavish style of the 17th century. It displays a portrait of Cardinal Mazarin from about 1665. The walls are decorated with grotesque polychrome paintings and gilding.

Other works on display from this period include a painting depicting the celebration of the marriage of Louis XIII with Anne of Austria, which took place on the place Royale (now the Place des Vosges) in April, 1612. There are several paintings of Madame de Sévigné, who lived in the house from 1677 until her death in 1696. Her letters to her daughter comprise the most detailed portrait of social and cultural life in Paris during the period.

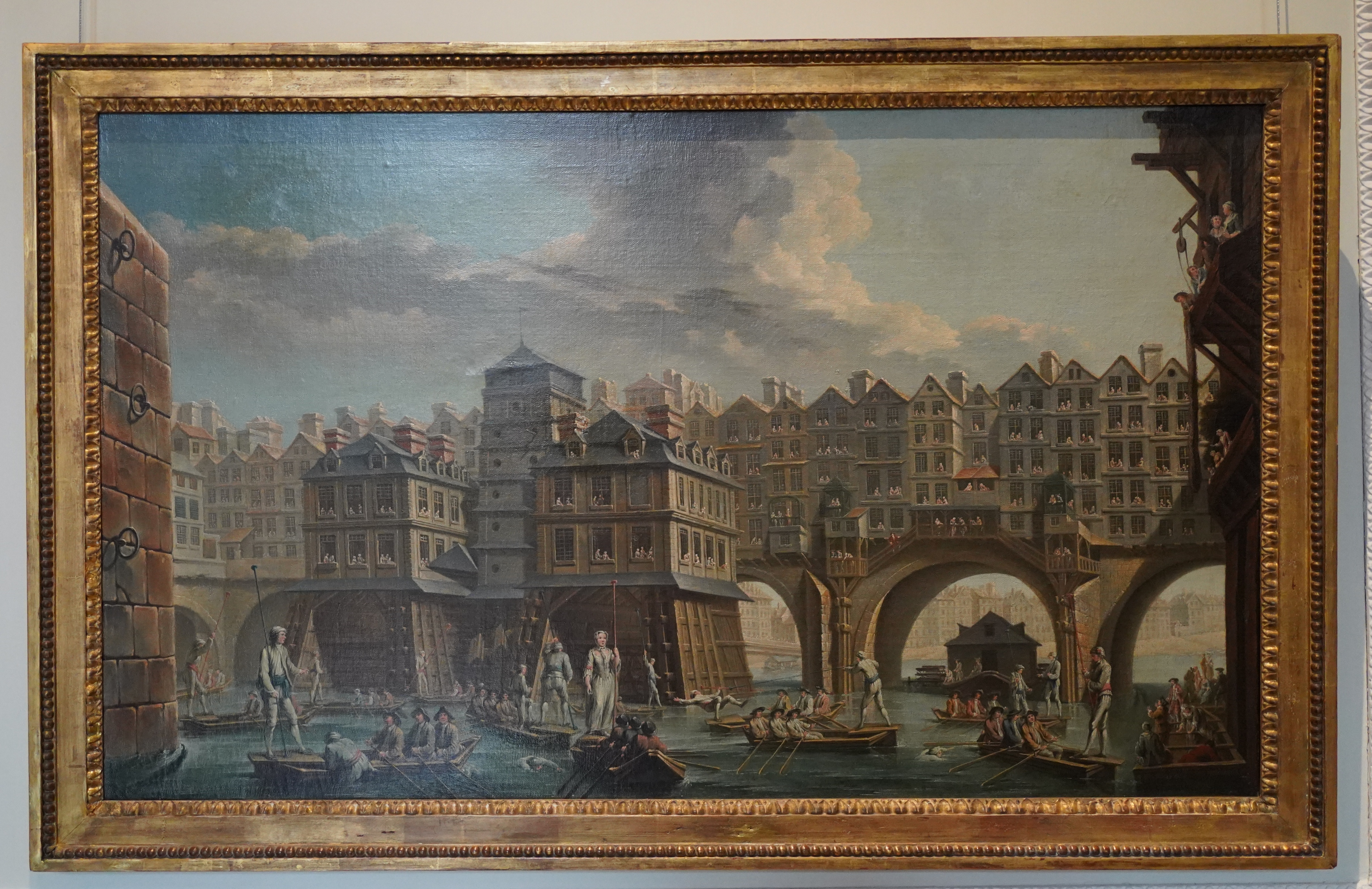
The "Jousting of the Boatmen" on the Seine between the Pont Notre-Dame and the Pont au Change, by Nicolas Jean-Bapiste Raguenet (1756)

=== The French Revolution (1789–1799) ===
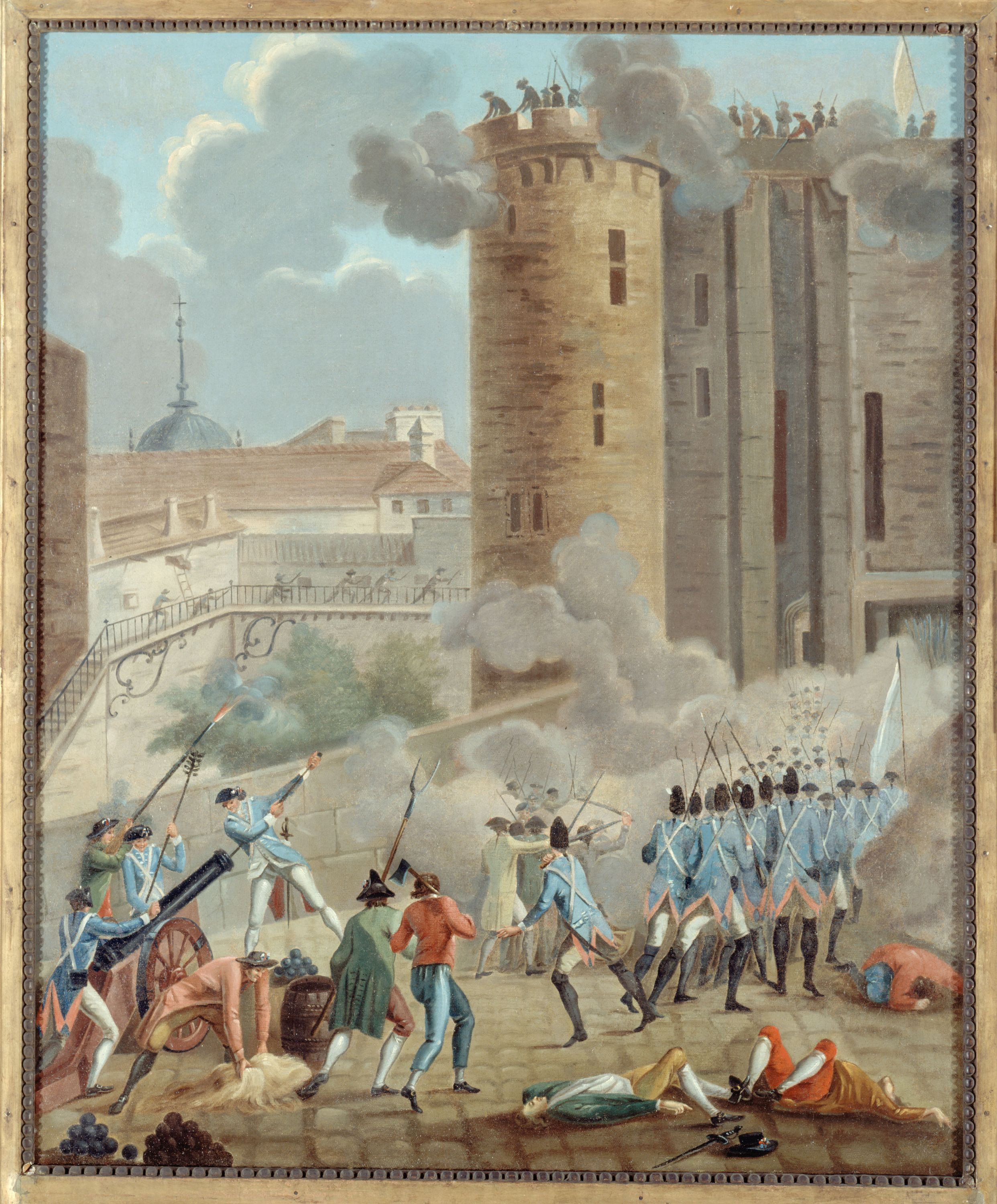
Storming of the Bastille, July 14, 1789, (Anonymous artist between 1789 and 1794)

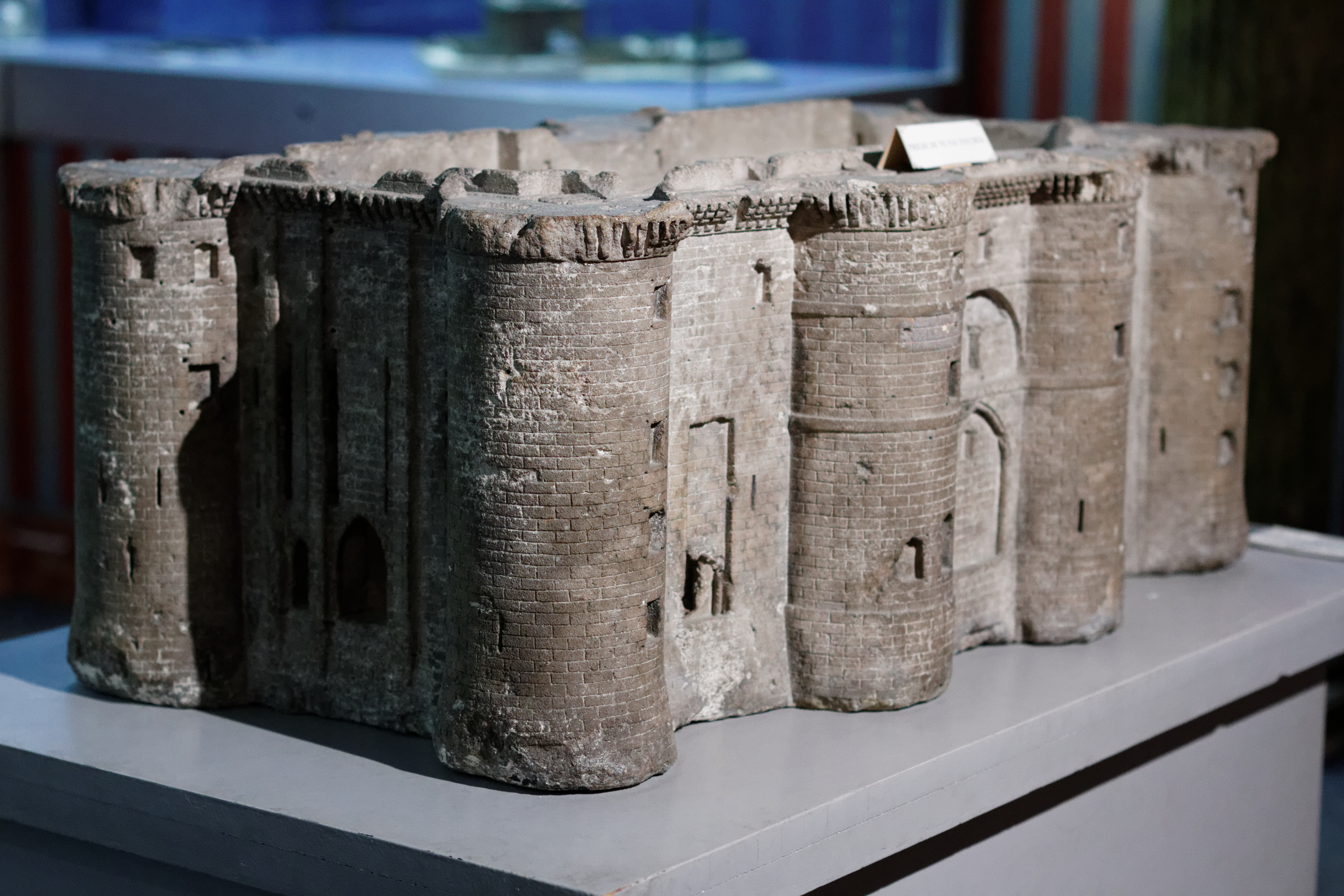
A stone from the Bastille made into a model of the prison

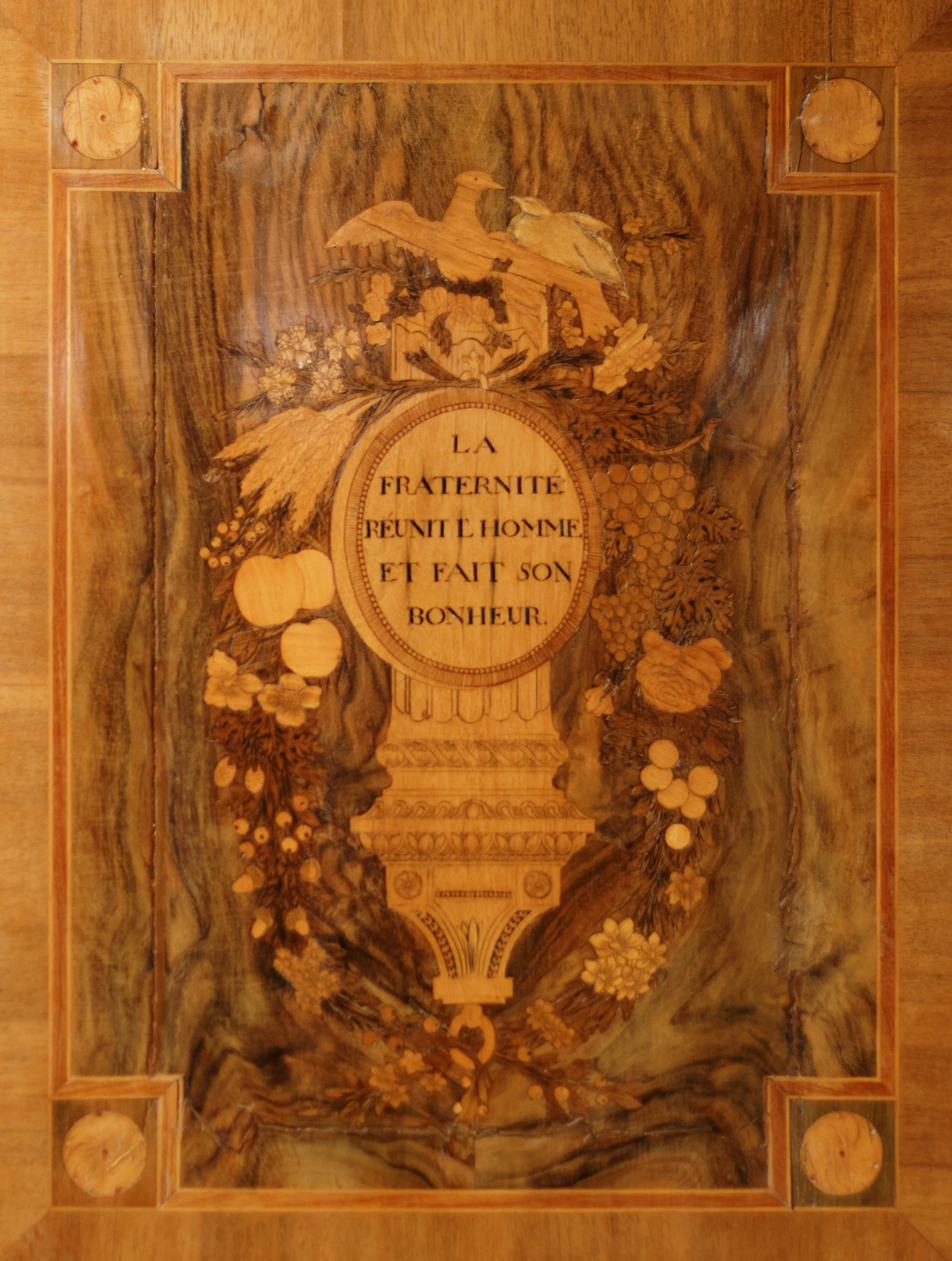
A buffet inlaid with Revolutionary slogans (18th c.)

Public discontent and hunger, and a royal government in Versailles judged out of touch with the hardships of the Parisians, led to the storming of the Bastille in July 1789 and the downfall of the monarchy. Louis XVI and his family were brought to Paris and imprisoned in the Tuileries Palace, then in the medieval tower on the Square du Temple. A moderate revolutionary government took power, but was replaced by the more radical Montagnard faction, led by Robespierre. The King was held 13 August 1792 to 21 January 1793, when he was taken to be guillotined at the Place de la Révolution; Marie Antoinette was imprisoned from 13 August 1792 to 1 August 1793 in the Temple's tower. The Montagnards imprisoned and then executed the more moderate revolutionaries during the Great Terror. Robespierre and his followers were in turn arrested and killed. A series of interim governments took and lost power, until finally Napoleon Bonaparte seized power in 1799, bringing the Revolutionary period to an end.

On the Second Level (Salles 2.51-2.57), The museum presents the most extensive existing collection of historic objects and art relating to the French Revolution. This part of the collection is located was the Hotel Le Pelletier de Saint-Fargeau. It was the residence of a prominent revolutionary figure, Louis-Michel Le Pelletier de Saint-Fargeau. He was a Deputy of the radical Montagnard faction, who was assassinated on 20 January 1793, because he had voted for the execution of King Louis XVI.

One notable feature remaining from the building of his time is the very ornate cast-iron stairway of honour to the upper floor. The walls decorated with gilded woodwork and mirrors, also original, illustrate the refined classical style of the late 18th century.

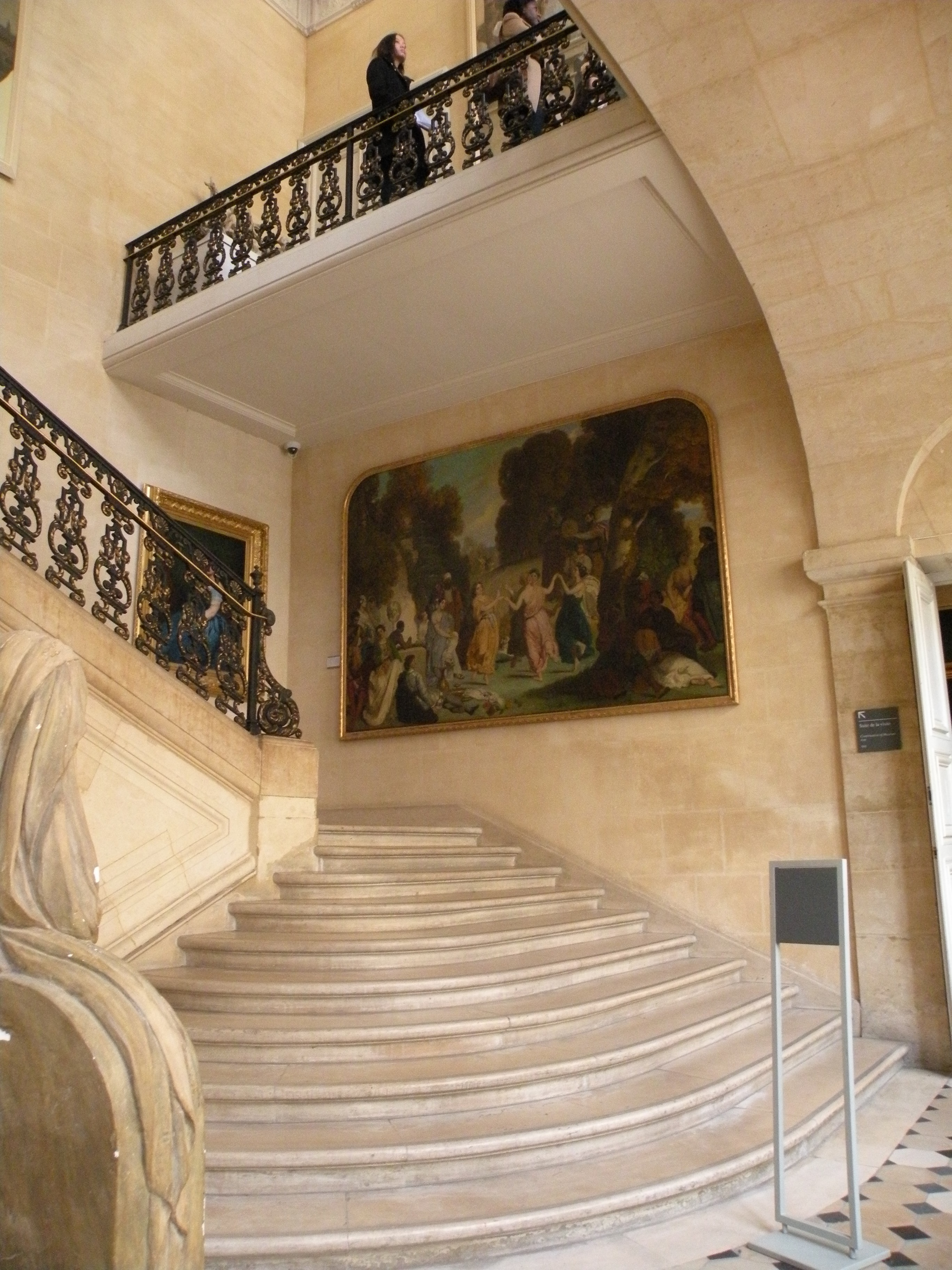
Stairway of Honor of the Hôtel Le Peletier de Saint-Fargeau (18th c.)

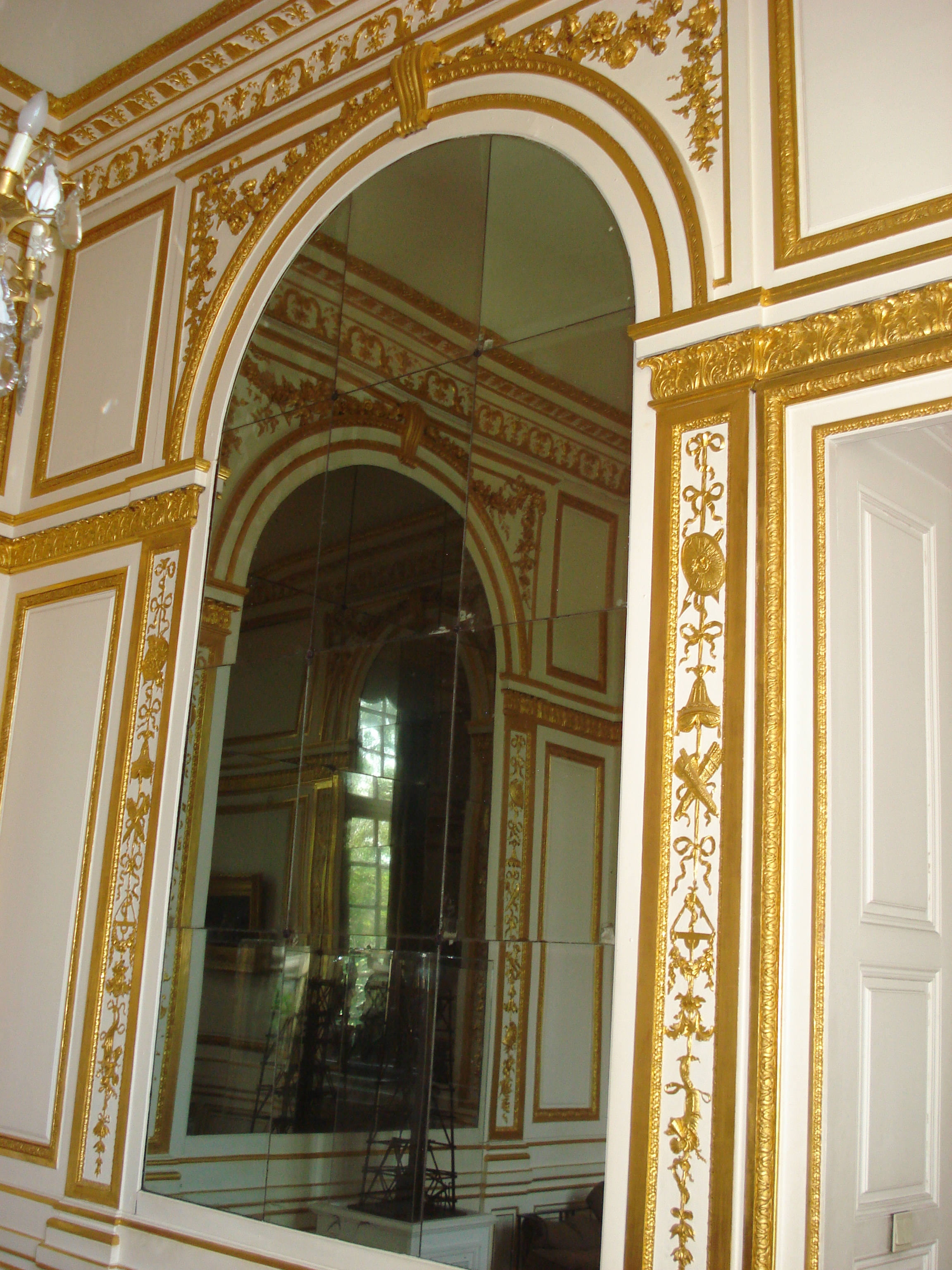
The gilded cabinet of the Hôtel Le Peletier de Saint-Fargeau

One furnished room in the section depicts the cell at the Temple Prison where Louis XVI, Marie Antoinette and their son were held prisoner beginning August 13, 1792. After the King's trial and execution on January 21, 1793, she was transferred to the Conciergerie for her own trial on October 14, 1793. She was sentenced to death two days later, and taken directly to the guillotine on the Place de la Concorde. The furniture is original, but the room is not an exact recreation, but an "evocation" of the original room.

Other works and objects relating to the Revolution include one of the original stones of the Bastille prison, carved into a replica of the prison. Eighty-three of these miniature Bastilles were carved in 1790 and one sent to each of the Departments of France by the new government.

- Paintings show the people's revenge on the Bastille, a dungeon that had become "a symbol of the arbitrariness of royal power."
- Paintings or sculptures of the major figures of the Revolution, including Mirabeau, Danton, Robespierre, and the royal family
- A painting of an execution by guillotine at the Place de la Révolution, by Pierre-Antoine Demauchy: the fate that struck King Louis XVI, Queen Marie Antoinette, the Royalists, the Girondins, the Hébertists, the Dantonists, Robespierre and his followers, and many others
- A paper on which Robespierre had partially written his signature when he was seized by soldiers of the National Convention.
- The original statue of King Henry IV of France on the Pont Neuf was pulled down and torn apart by the Sans-Culottes during the Revolution. The remaining fragments are displayed. It was replaced in the 19th century by the present copy.

=== Napoleon Bonaparte through Louis-Philippe (1800–1848) ===
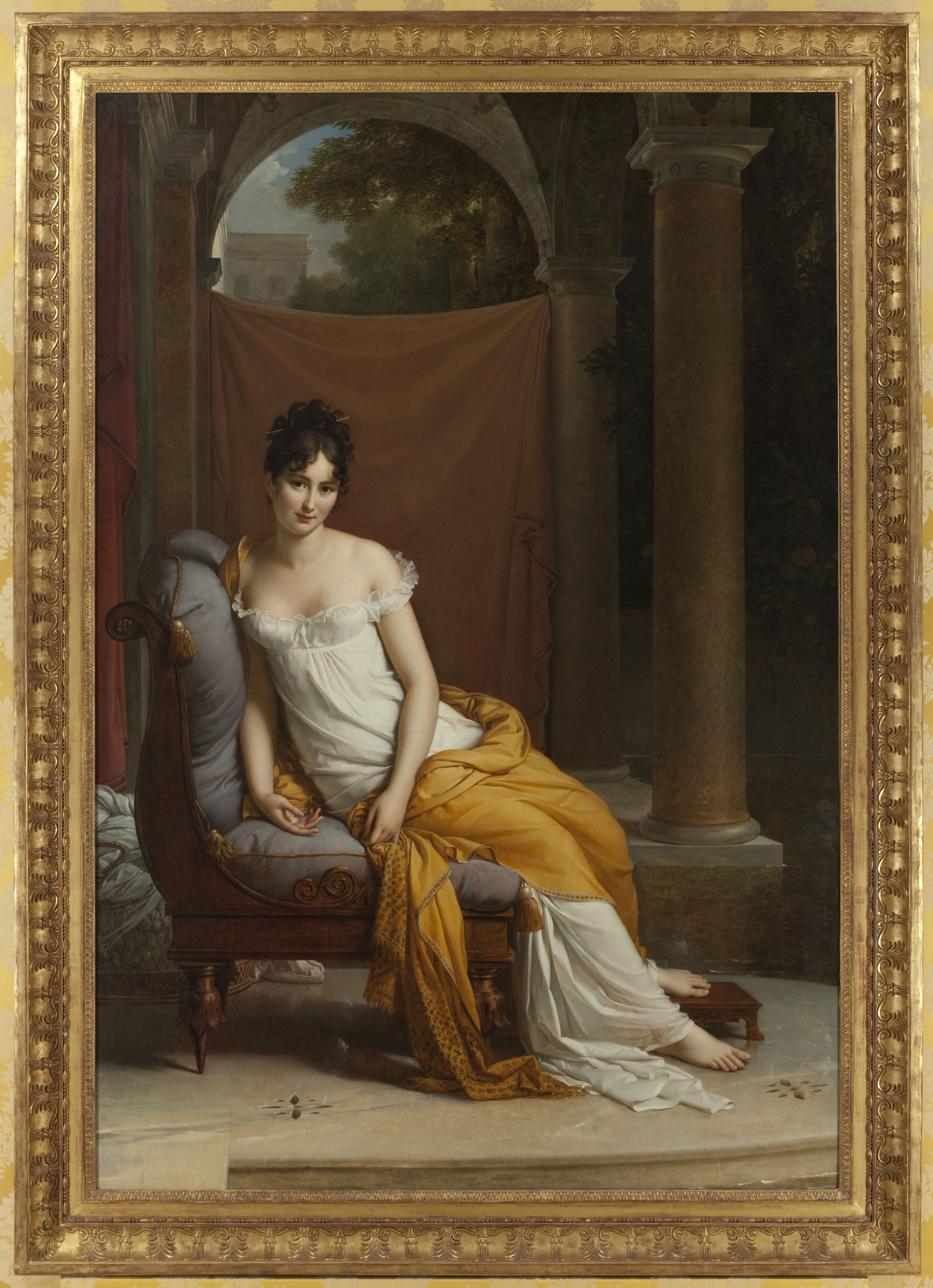
Portrait of Juliette Récamier bu François Gérard (1805)

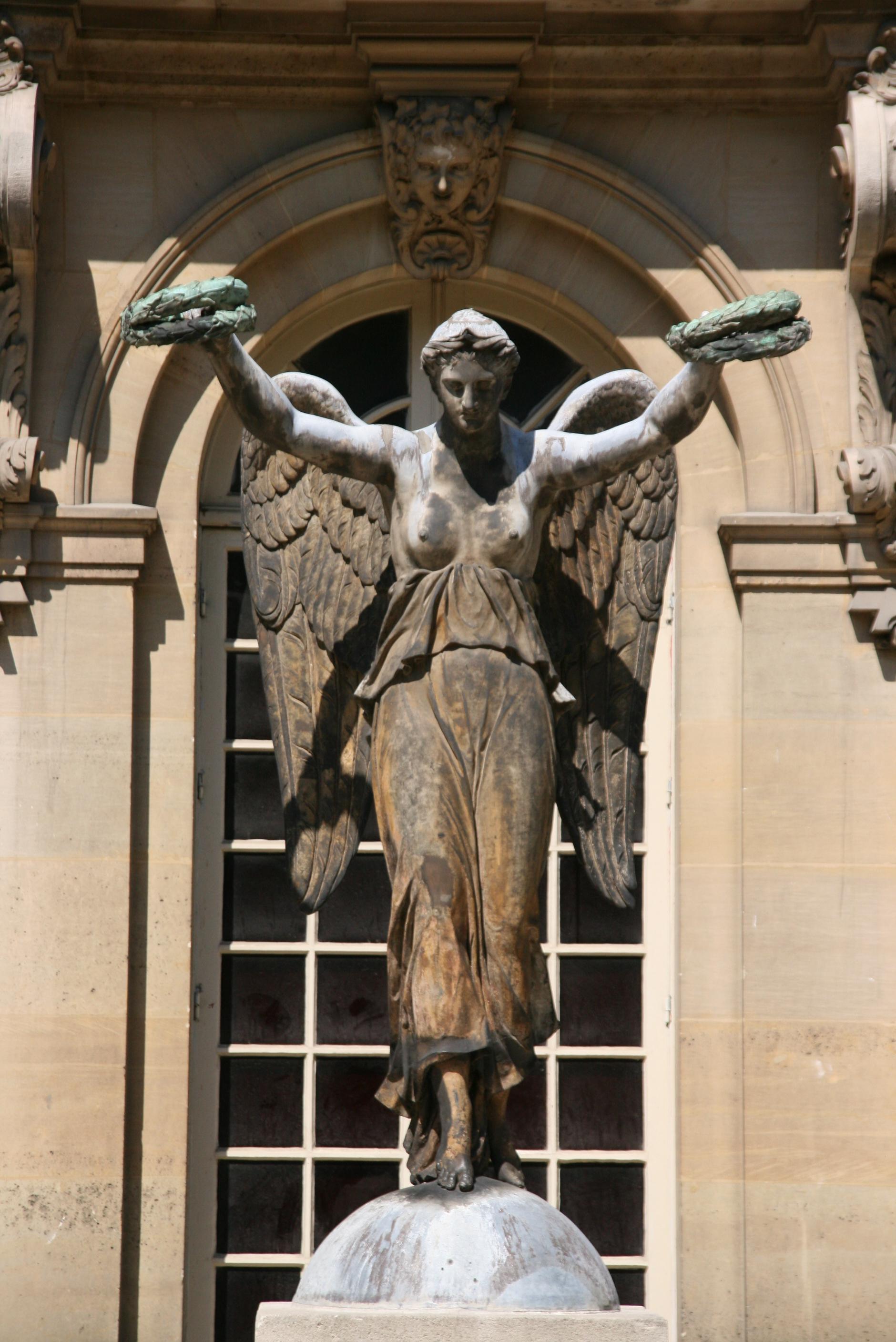
Statue of "Victory" or "Immortality" by Louis-Simone Boizot (1806-1808), originally on Place du Châtelet, now on the facade of the museum

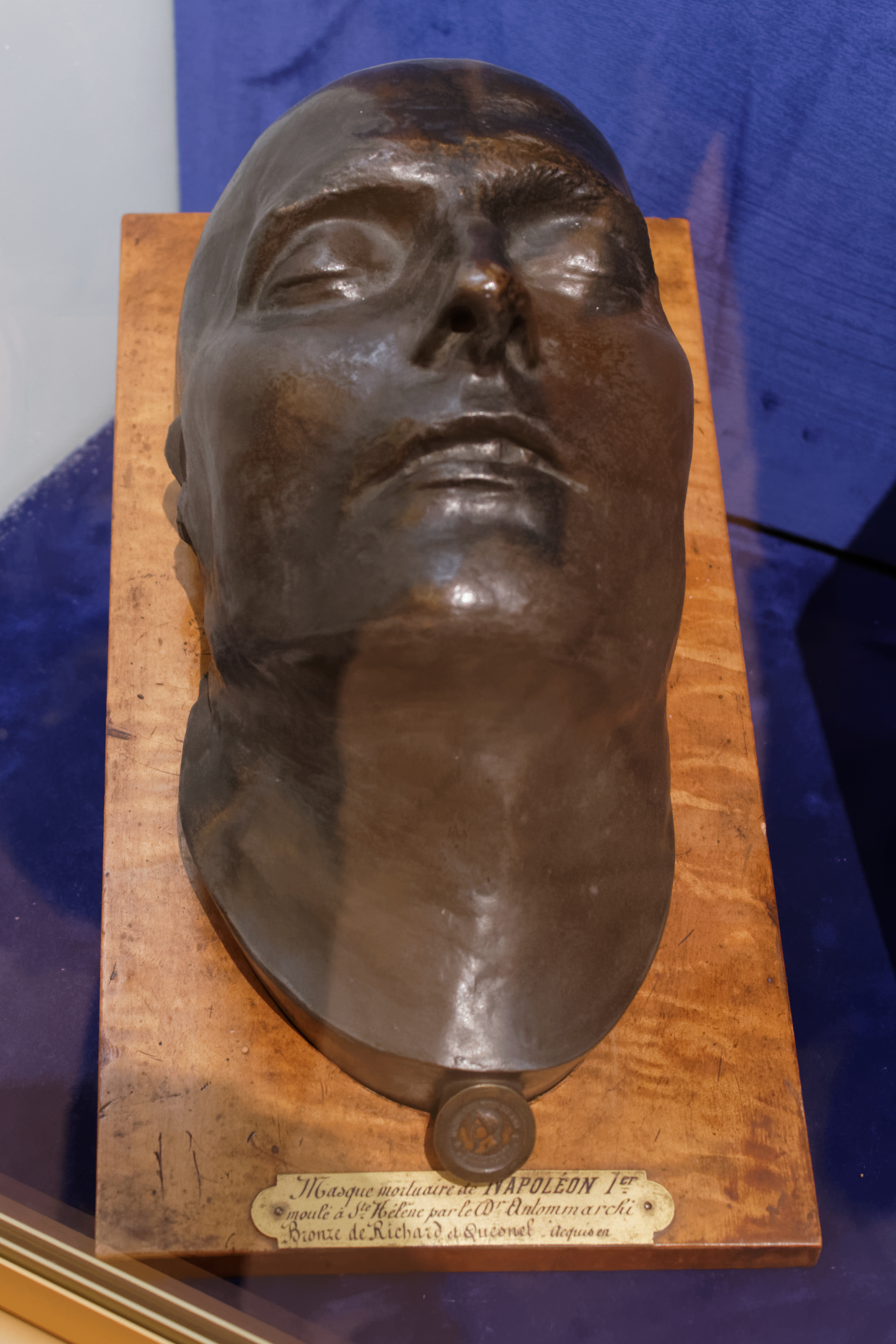
The death mask of Napoleon Bonaparte

During the 19th century, Paris was the scene of three revolutions and was administered by six different governments, each of which left its imprint on the city. Beginning in 1800, under Napoleon Bonaparte, Paris was governed directly by the Prefect of the Government of the Seine, and a Prefect of Police, both named by him. After his Coronation as Emperor in 1804, Napoleon set out to embellish Paris as his Imperial capital. His architects Charles Percier and Pierre Fontaine, constructed the arcades of the Rue de Rivoli, and placed a column with his statue on Place Vendome, modelled after that of the Roman Emperor Trajan in Rome. He decorated the fountain on Place du Châtelet with a statue of victory, to celebrate his Egyptian and Italian campaign. In 1899, the statue was moved to the courtyard of the museum. Personal souvenirs of Napoleon displayed in the museum include the case of dishes and silverware which he took with him on his military campaigns, and his death mask. It also displays paintings of notable Parisians of the time, including the celebrated portrait of Juliette Récamier by François Gérard (1805).

Following the final downfall and exile of Napoleon in 1815, the restored French king, Charles X faced the political turbulence of the Parisians. In 1830 he attempted to bring it under control by ending freedom of the press and reducing the size of the Chamber of Deputies. This aroused an even greater fury among the Parisians. During 27–30 July 1830, known as the "Trois Glorieuses", the Parisians rebelled, forcing the King abdicate and to depart Paris for exile. His place was taken by King Louis Philippe. This revolution was commemorated by two new Paris monuments, the Arc de Triomphe on the Place de l'Étoile and the July Column in the center of the Place de la Bastille. In 1834, Louis Philippe also had the Luxor Obelisk, brought from Egypt, raised into place in the center of the Place de la Concorde. An epidemic of cholera struck Paris in 1832; the overcrowded neighbourhoods in the center of the city were particularly hard hit. Louis Philippe responded with construction of the first network of Paris sewers, and the construction of new and wider streets.

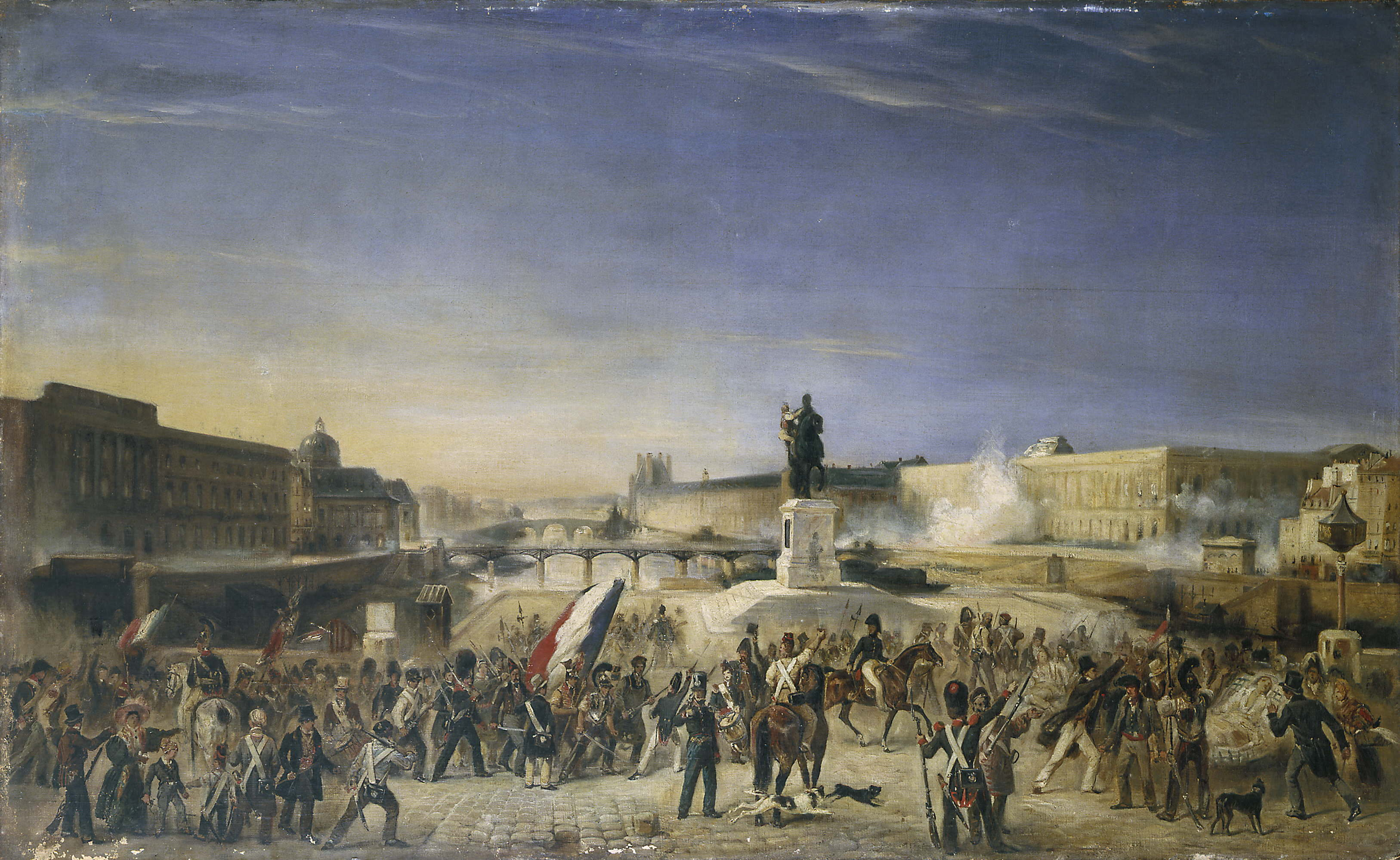
The Louvre under attack during the 1830 July Revolution, which overthrew King Charles X of France

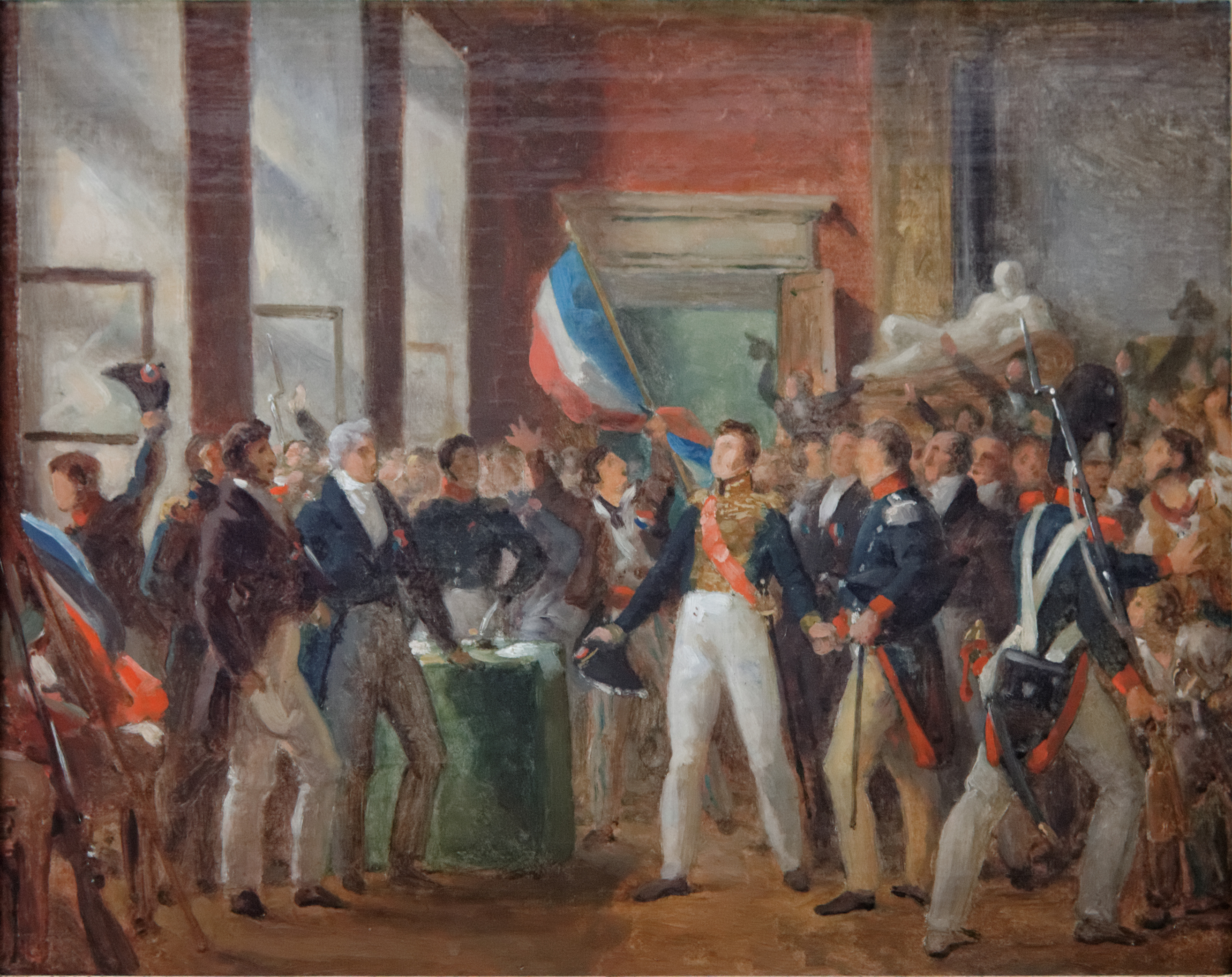
Louis Phillipe celebrates victory at the Hotel de Ville on 31 July 1830

Discontent with Louis Philippe appeared in the February Revolution of 1848, with new demonstrations and riots in Paris. A new French Republic was proclaimed, and Louis Napoleon, nephew of Napoleon Bonaparte, was elected president. At the end of 1851 he orchestrated a coup d'État and proclaimed himself Emperor.

- A painting depicting one of the most important moments of the July Revolution: The Seizing of the Louvre, 29 July 1830, by Jean-Louis Bézard
- Sculptures of Parisians of the time, some realistic portrayals, others caricatures, by Jean-Pierre Dantan

=== The Paris of Napoleon III (1848–1871) ===
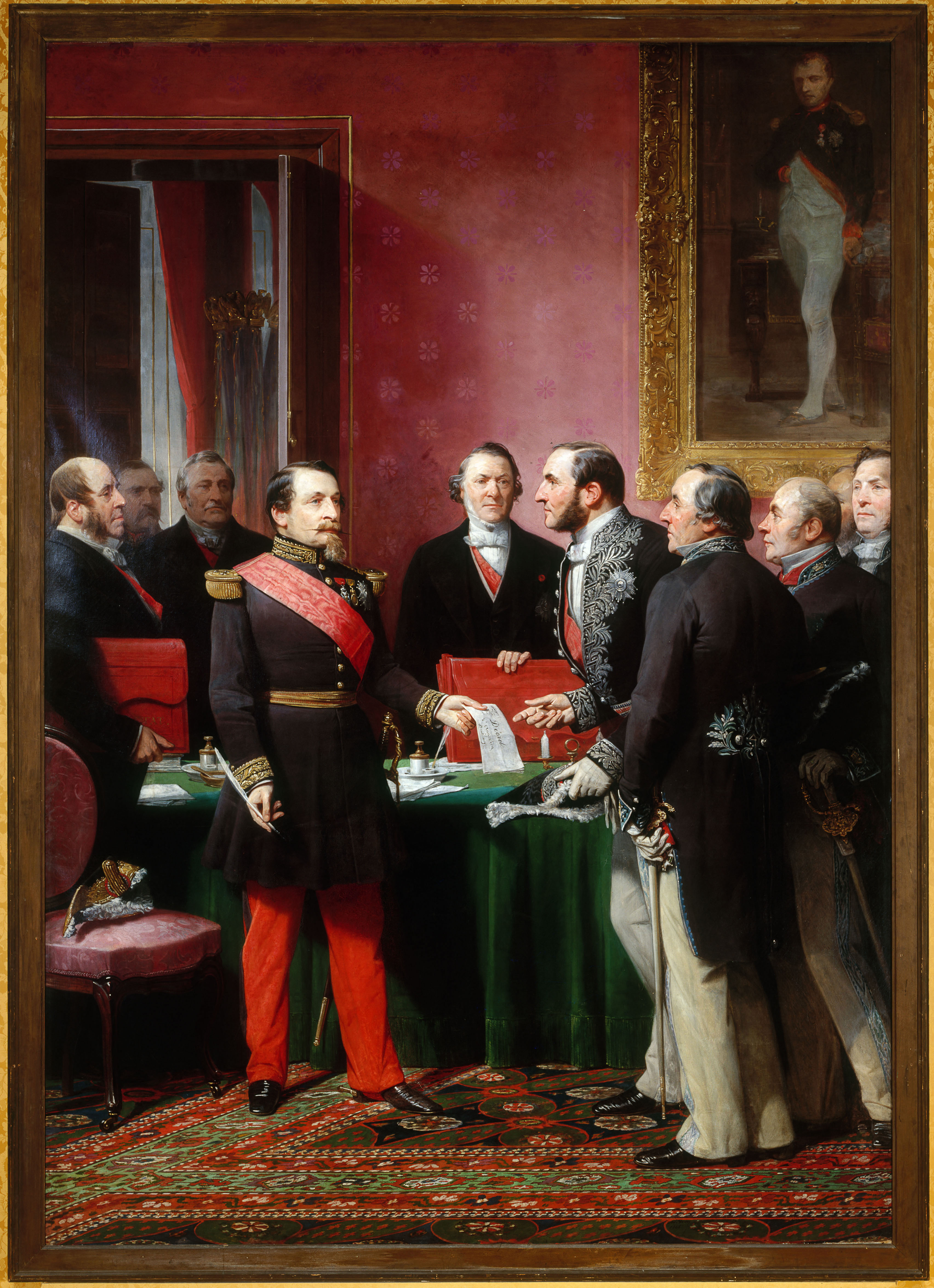
Baron Haussmann presents to Napoleon III the plan for annexing the communes surrounding Paris (1859)

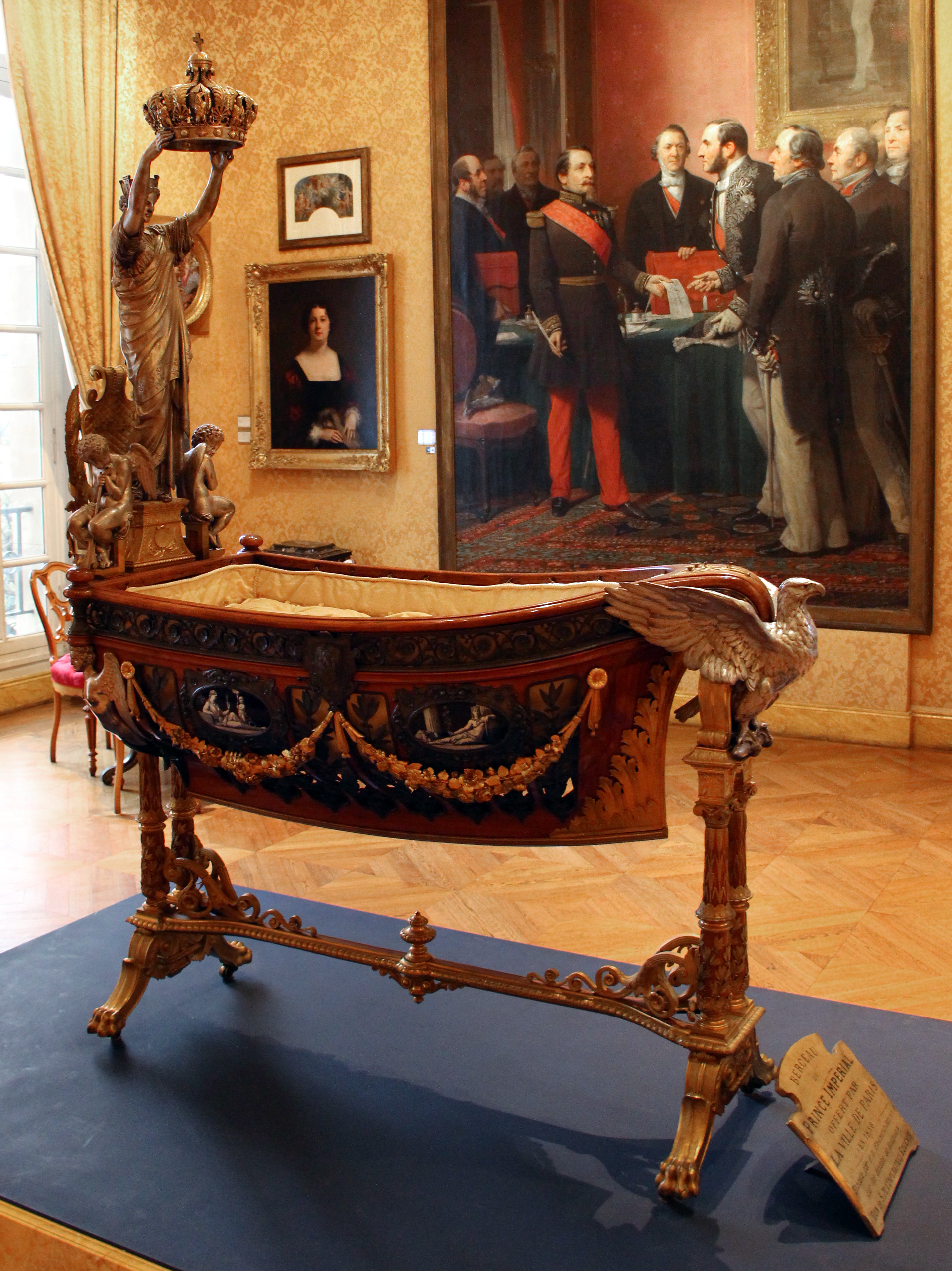
Cradle of Louis Napoleon Bonaparte, the son of Napoleon III (1856)

Napoleon III played an important role in creating the present extent and map of Paris. On January 6, 1848, he expanded the city from twelve to twenty-one arrondissements. taking in the surrounding communes that were outside the city walls. He named Georges-Eugène Haussmann, as his prefect of the Seine, and began construction of a new network of tree-lined boulevards and avenues linking new public squares and monuments. He also demolished blocks of overcrowded and unhealthy housing in the center. On the edges of the city he created major parks, including the Bois de Boulogne and Bois de Vincennes, modelled upon the parks he had seen during his exile in London. These new Parisian parks soon served as models for parks in other cities, including Central Park in New York. In addition, he built new theatres and concert halls, including the Paris Opera, adding to the city's reputation as a cultural capital.

=== The siege of Paris and the Paris Commune (1870–1871) ===
Following the capture of Napoleon III by the Prussians at the Battle of Sedan on 2 September 1870, Paris was besieged by the Prussian army. Despite shortages of food and water, the city endured the siege until January 1871, when an armistice was signed by the French government. A party of leftist Parisians, known as the Paris Commune, refused to accept the armistice or the rule of the French government. They seized a park full of cannon, killed two French army generals, and established a separate government. The Commune lasted for 72 days, until, during the Semaine Sanglante (21–28 May 1871) the city was recaptured by the French Army. In the final days of the Commune, its soldiers set fires and destroyed many Paris landmarks, including the Hotel de Ville and the Tuileries Palace. Between 7–10,000 Communards were killed in the street battles or executed by the army immediately afterwards. The museum's holdings on these events includes the Binant Series of paintings.

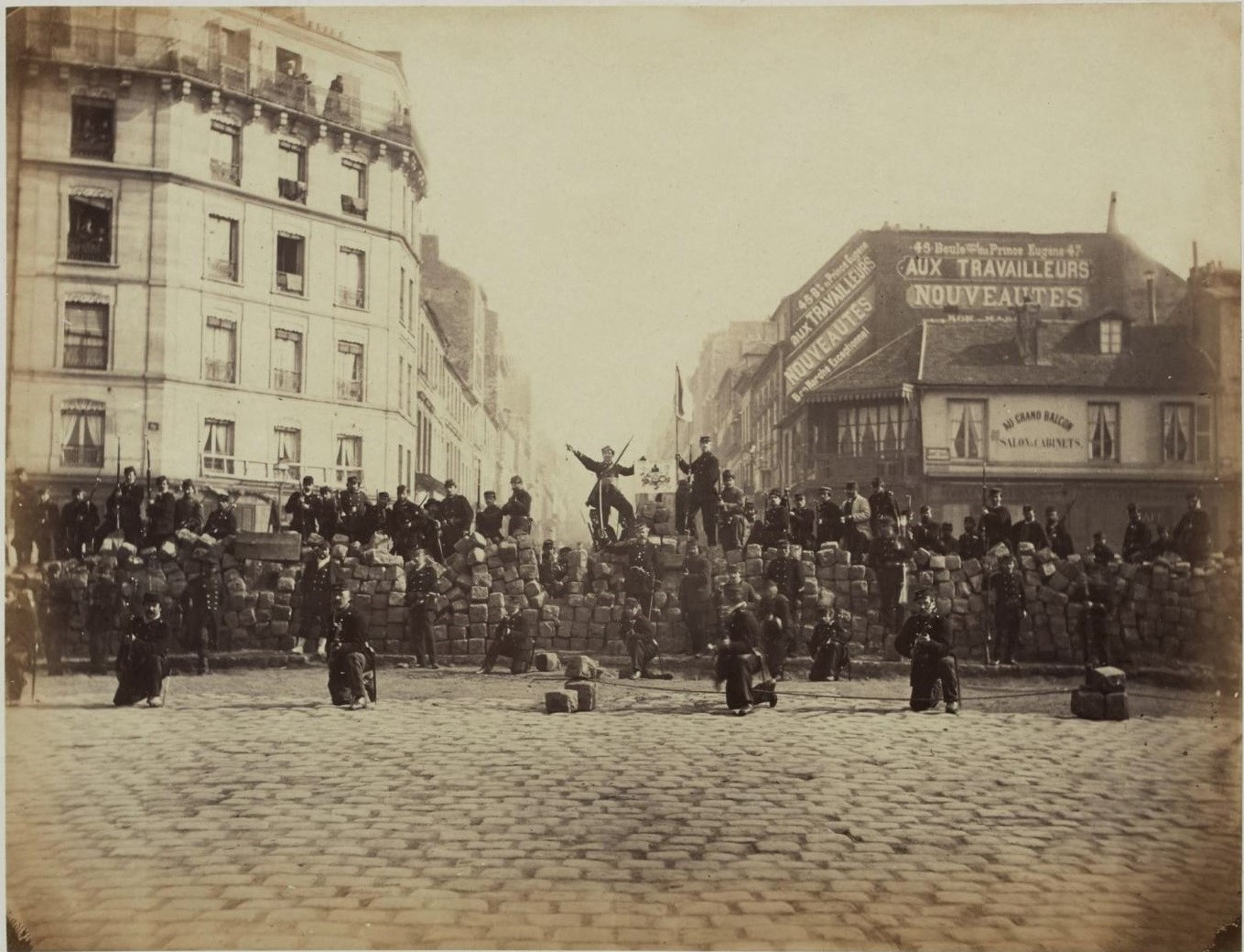
Photograph of a barricade erected by the Paris Commune on March 18, 1871

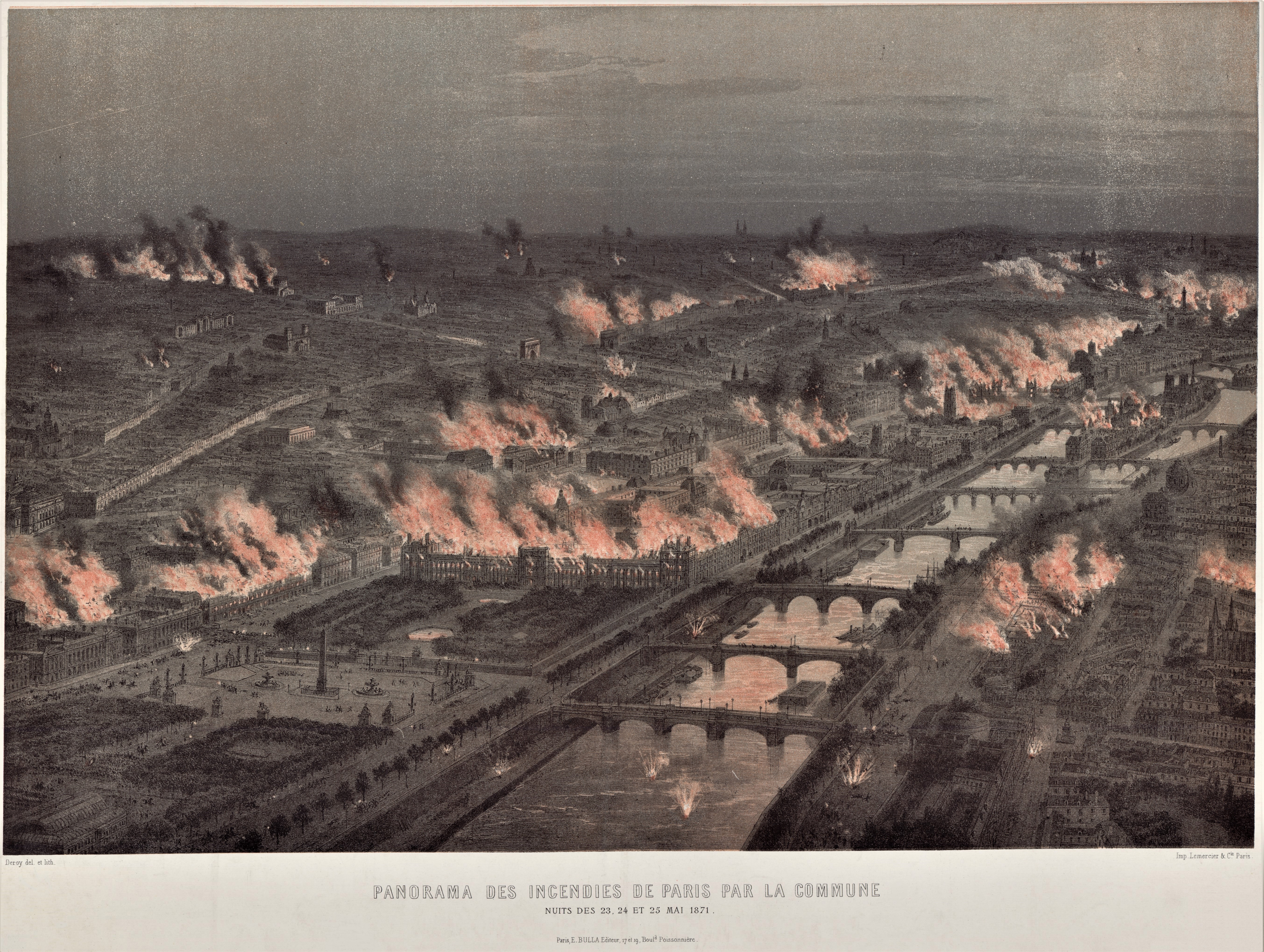
Fires set by the Commune the night of May 23–34, 1871, during the Semaine Sanglante

=== Paris in the Belle Époque (1880–1914) ===
The Belle Époque was a flourishing period for Paris cultural life. It was particularly expressed at the international expositions in 1889, which gave the city the Eiffel Tower, and 1900 Paris International Exposition, which added the Grand Palais and the Paris Metro. An important collection of paintings by major illustrators of Paris life in the period, including Henri Gervex, Carlolus-Duran, Louise Abbéma and Jean Béraud was donated to the museum in 2001 by François-Gérard Seligmann, and is displayed in the corridor of the first floor. The section also includes a colourful variety of posters from the epoch created by Alphonse Mucha and other artists, including posters for the Chat Noir and Moulin Rouge cabaret.

A painting by Paul-Joseph-Victor Dargaud depicts the assembly of the Statue of Liberty (Liberty Enlightening the World). The iron pieces were formed at the boundary of Gaget on rue de Chazelles in Paris, then disassembled and shipped to New York in pieces.

Jean Béraud (1849-1935), born in St. Petersburg, Russia, became a meticulous painter of Paris society. The museums holds more than eighty of his works.

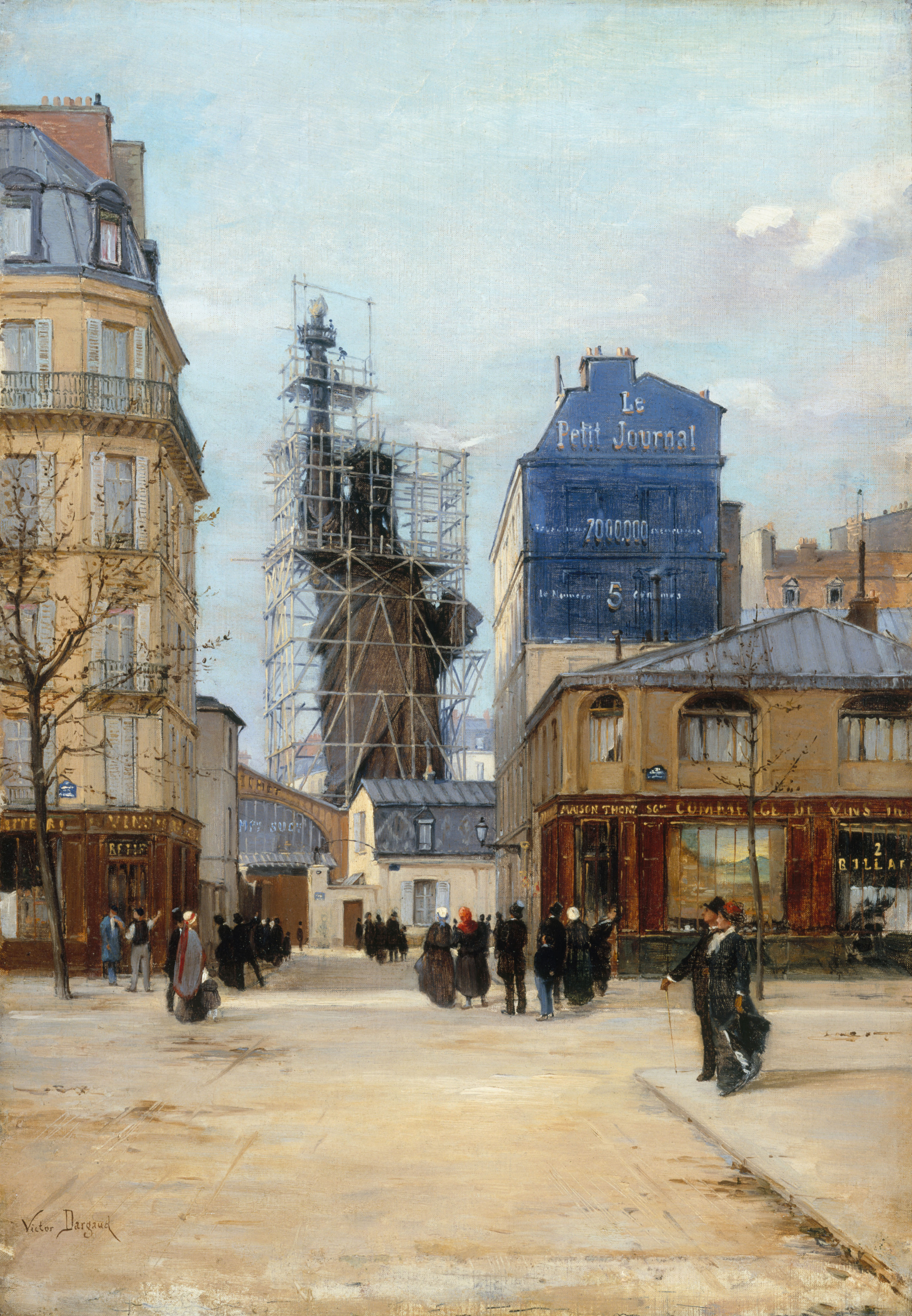
The Statue of Liberty being assembled at the foundry of Gaget. rue de Chazelles, by Paul-Joseph-Victor Dargaud (1884)

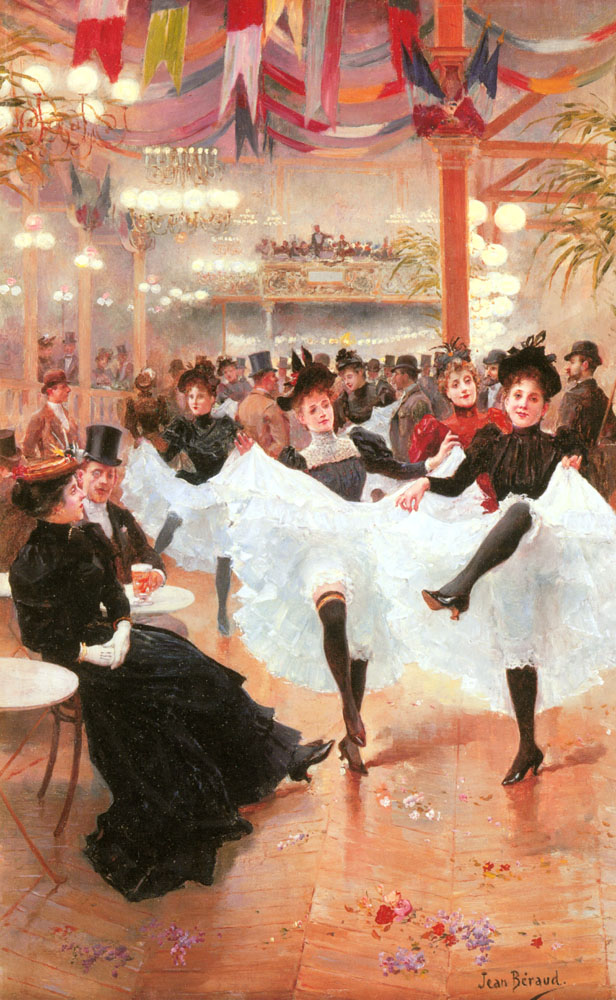
The Cafe de Paris, by Jean Béraud

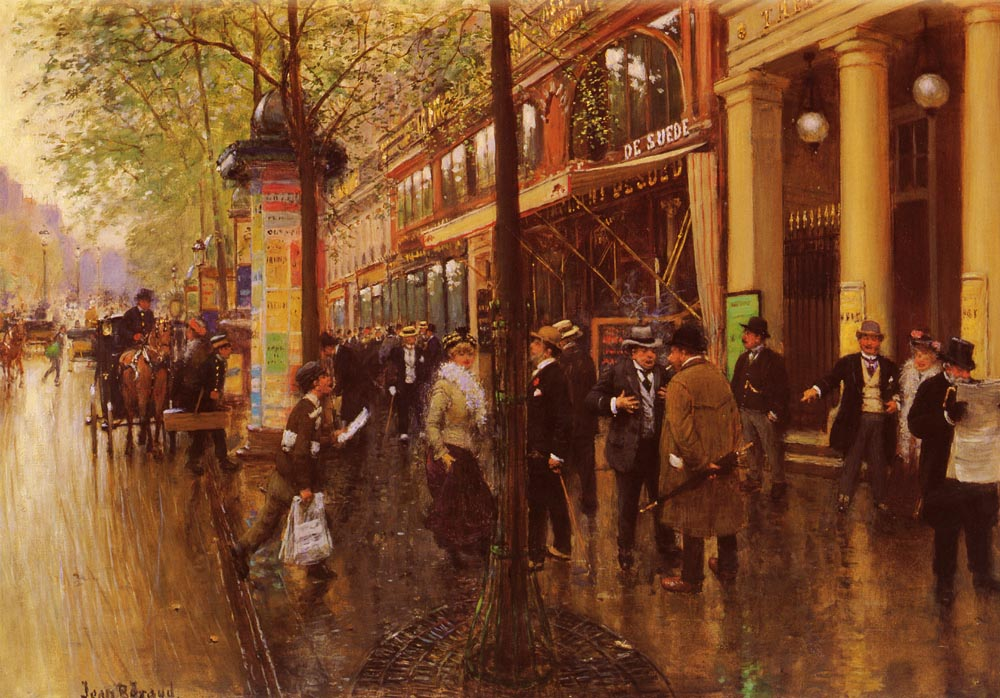
"The Grand Boulevards, exit of the Theatre des Varietes" by Jean Béraud

The Art Nouveau style first was born in Brussels shortly before the end of the 19th century, and quickly moved to Paris. It was vividly expressed in the Paris metro stations and posters of Alphonse Mucha. Two landmark rooms in the Art Nouveau style are displayed in the museum; a private dining room in the Art Nouveau from the Café de Paris (1899), and the jewellery shop of Georges Fouquet, designed by Alphonse Mucha (1901).

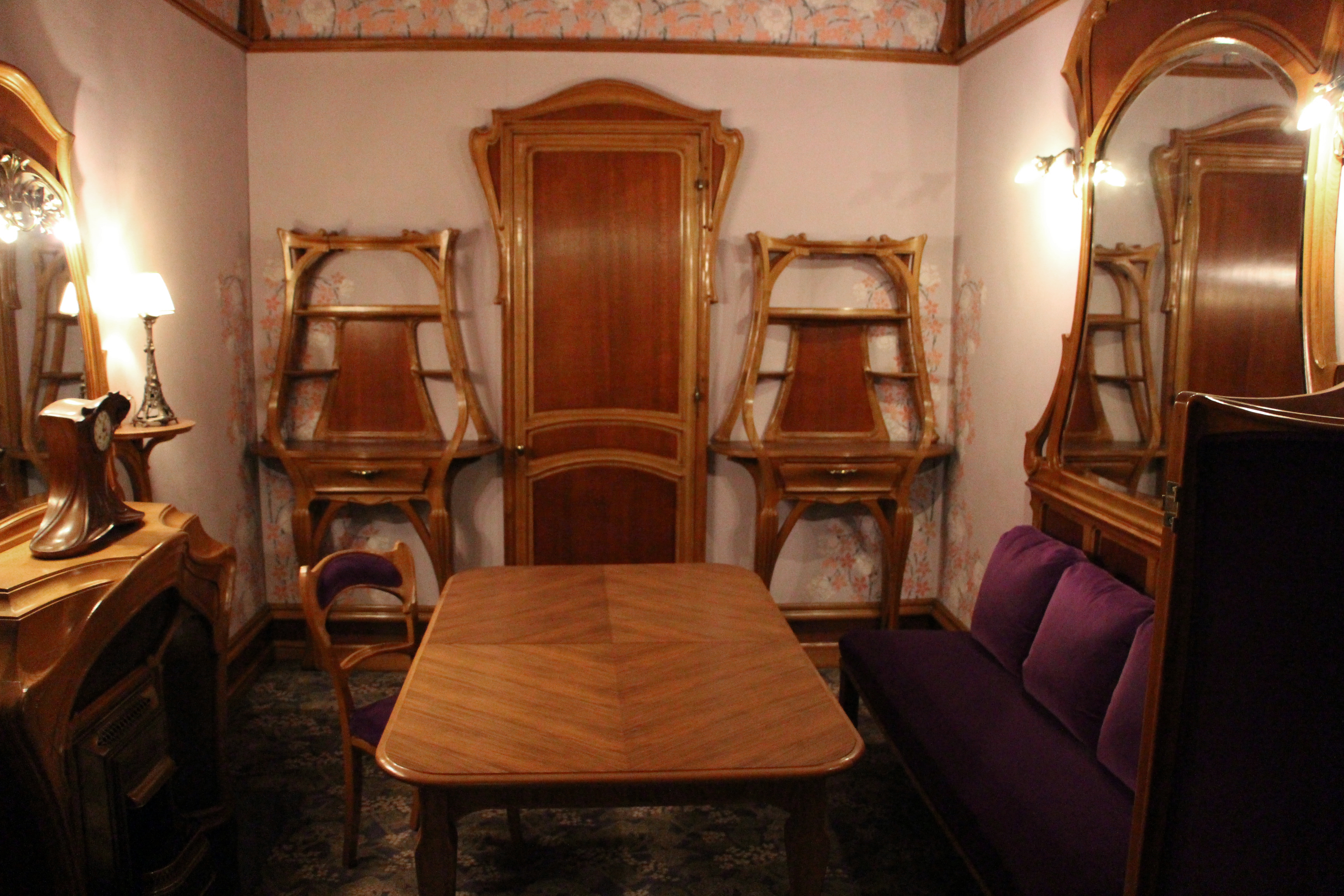
A private dining room, in Art Nouveau style, from the Café de Paris (1899)

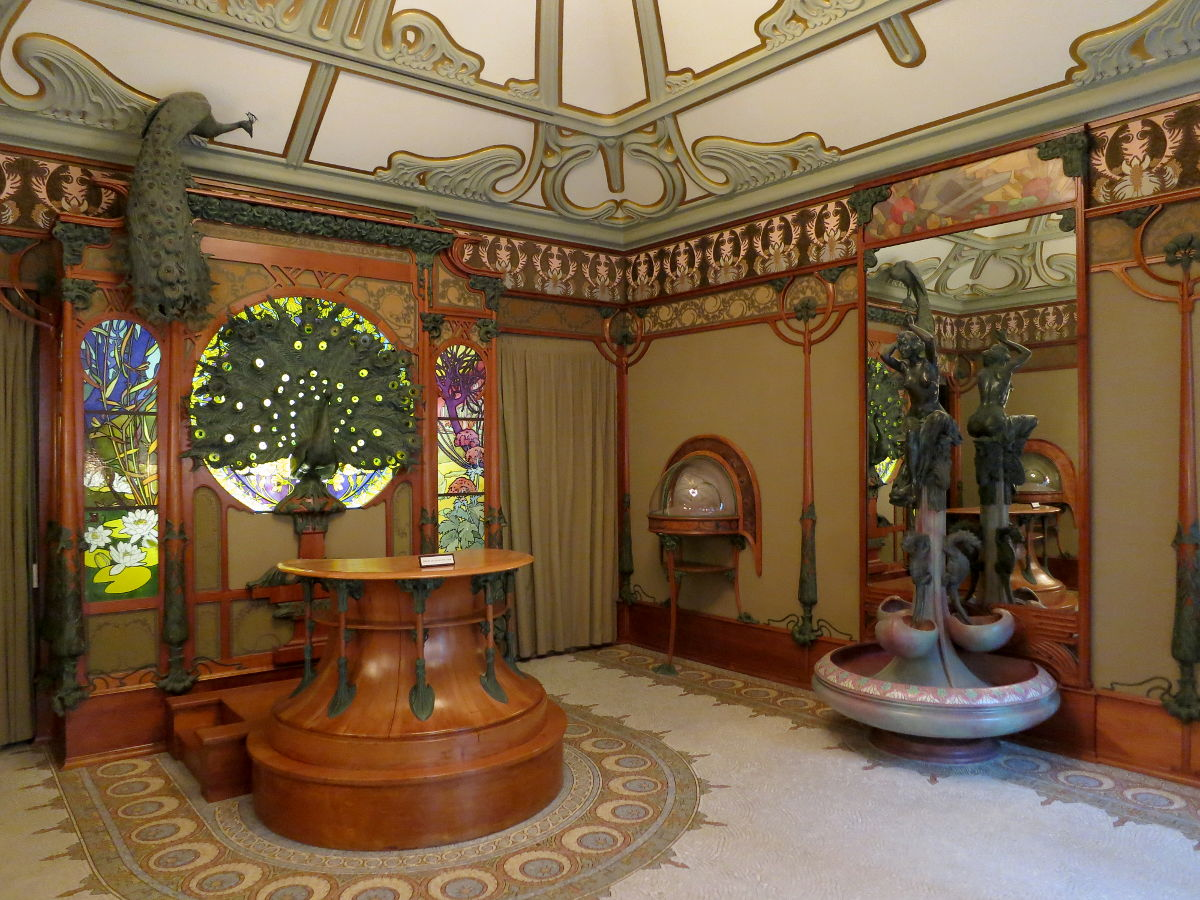
The jewellery shop of Georges Fouquet, designed by Alphonse Mucha in the Art Nouveau style (1901)

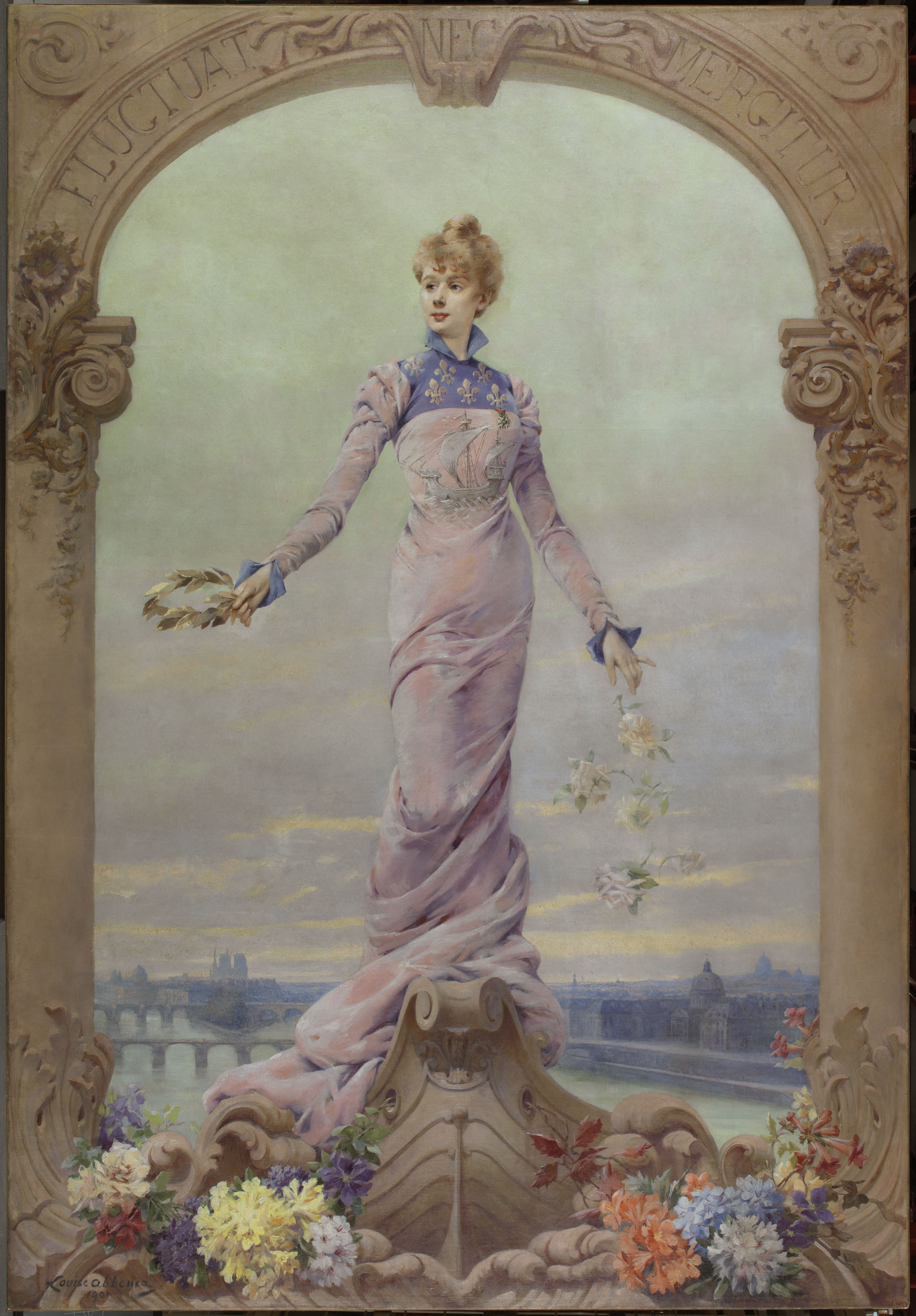
Allegory of the City of Paris, by Louise Abbéma (1901)

=== Paris in the 20th and 21st centuries ===
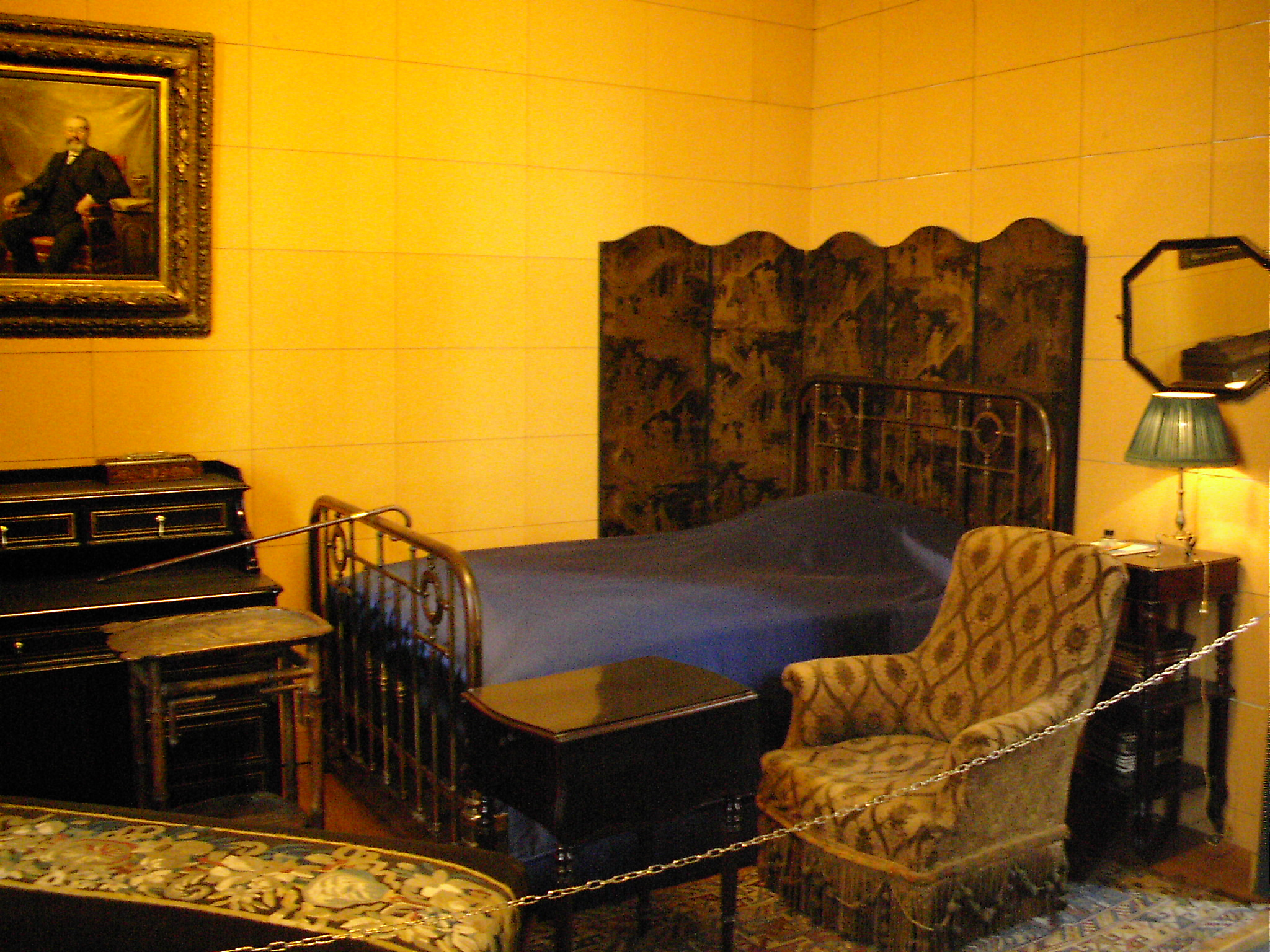
Recreation of the room of Marcel Proust, with his original furniture, where he wrote In Search of Lost Time (1913–1927)

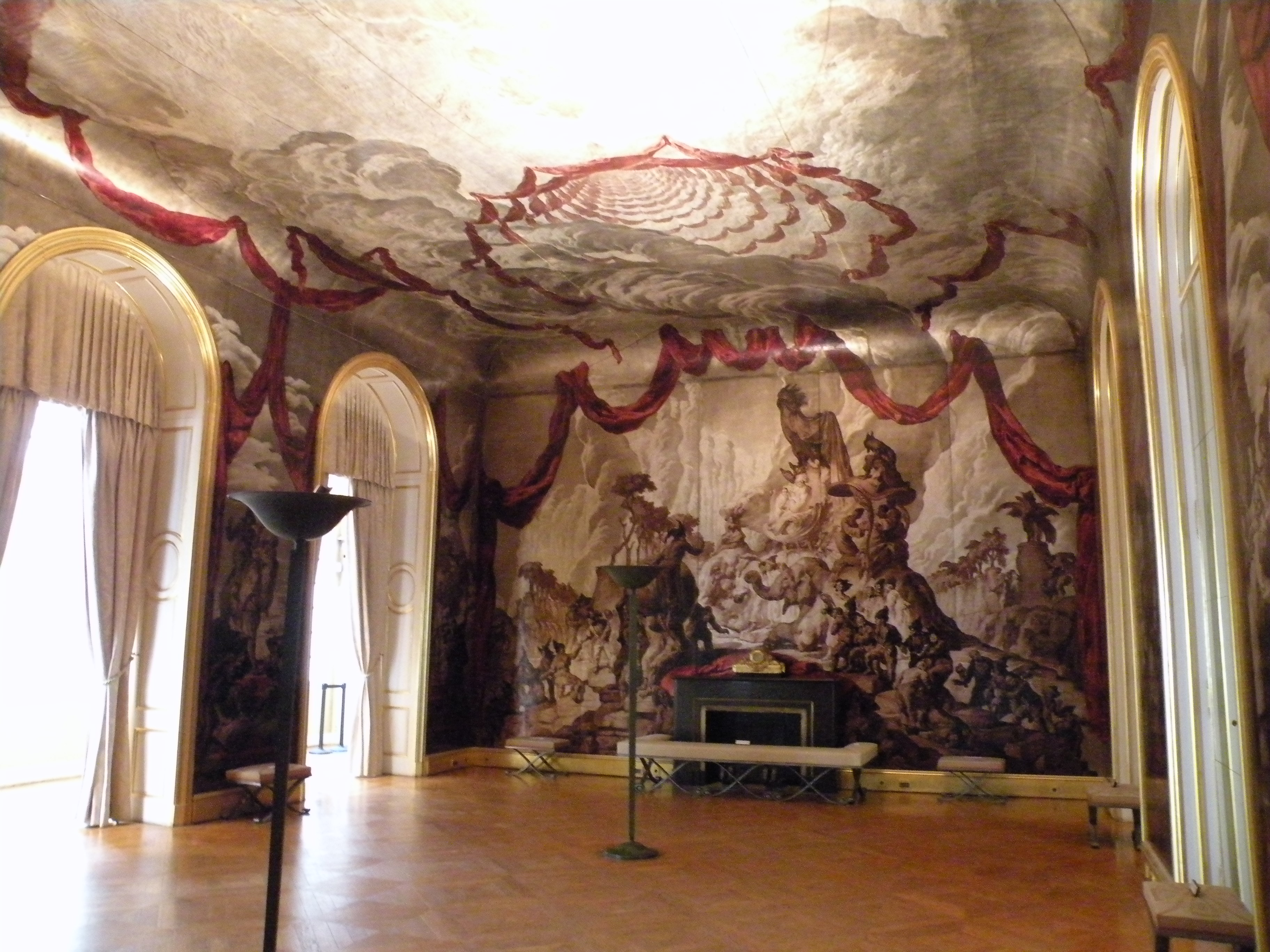
Surrealist ballroom of the Hôtel de Wendel (1924)

The renovated museum opened in 2021 includes, for the first time, a series of rooms devoted to Paris history In the 20th and 21st centuries. The exhibits include:

- Furniture and personal belongings, including his cane and overcoat, from the rooms where Marcel Proust wrote In search of lost time Proust did his writing at night, and slept during the day.
- The colourful Surrealist ballroom of the Hotel de Wendel, on Avenue New York, made in 1924 by the Catalan artist José Maria Sert for its owner Maurice de Wendel, and his wife Misia, for their balls and entertainments. Wendel explained: "After considerable hesitation, we ordered the decor, but only the general tonality was specified. For the rest, we had a vague idea that it should show the Queen of Sheba in a chariot being drawn by gazelles." The surrealist paintings extend above the walls onto the ceiling.
- The desk of the American art patron Gertrude Stein from her residence at 27 rue de Fleurus, where she invited and encouraged modern artists, including Pablo Picasso and Henri Matisse. Behind the desk is an enlarged photograph by Man Ray of Stein at her desk.
- Photographs of 20th-century Paris by Eugène Atget and Henri Cartier-Bresson
- A stylized painting of a crowded bistro of the mid-1900s, by the naturalized Japanese artist, Leonard Foujita
- A collection of propaganda photographs given to the museum by the German Occupation government between 1940 and 1944, for mandatory exhibition.
- A collection of photographs from 1944 documenting the liberation of Paris.
- A photograph in daguerreotype, The Forum of the Halles, taken by two American photographers in 1989 for an exhibit at the Carnavalet celebrating the 150th anniversary of the invention of photography
- A textile work called "Paris, Ville Lumière" (1974), by artists Nil Yalter and Judy Blum, with twenty panels, plus photographs, texts and drawings, illustrating each arrondissement of the city.

== Gallery of shop signs ==
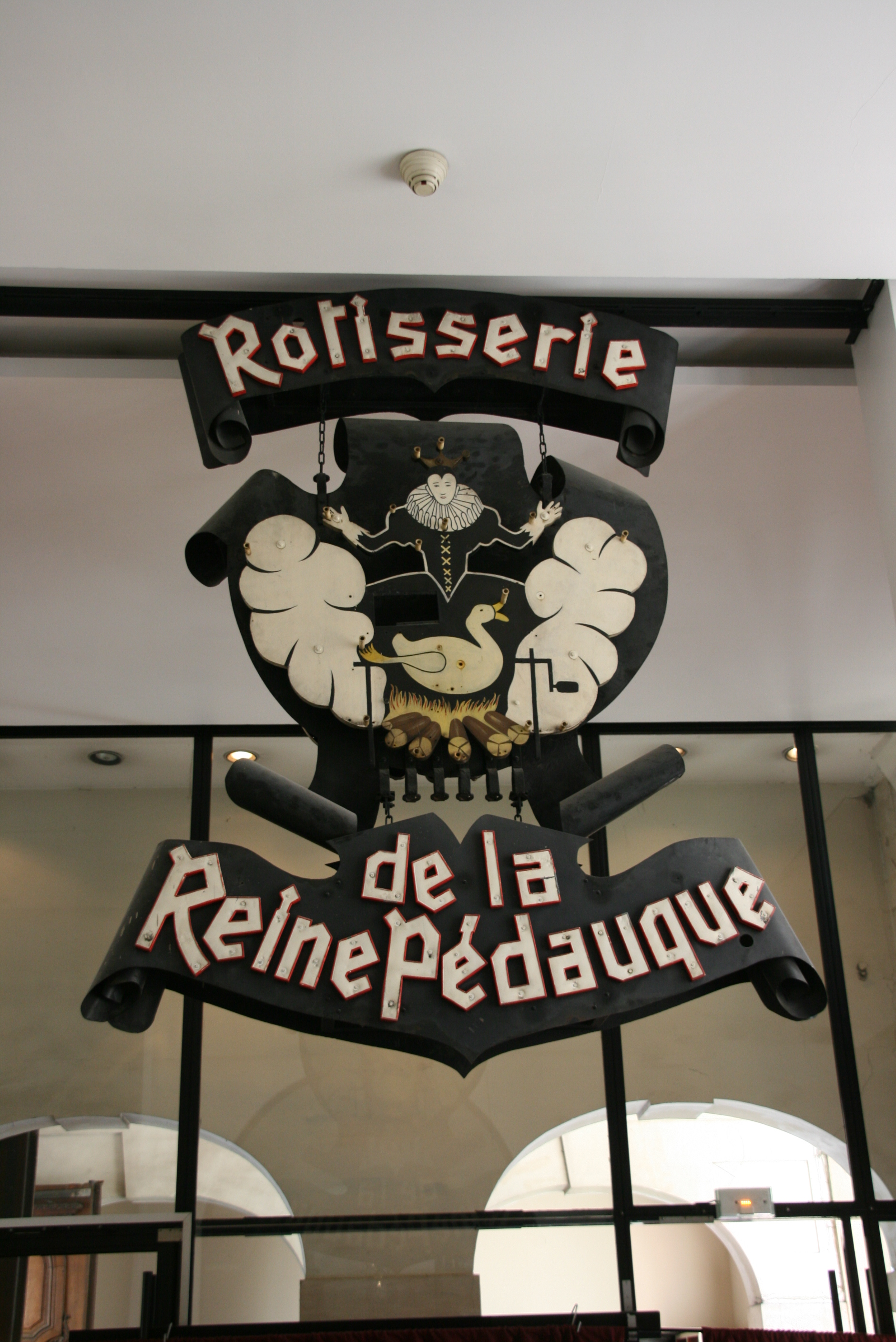
19th century shop sign

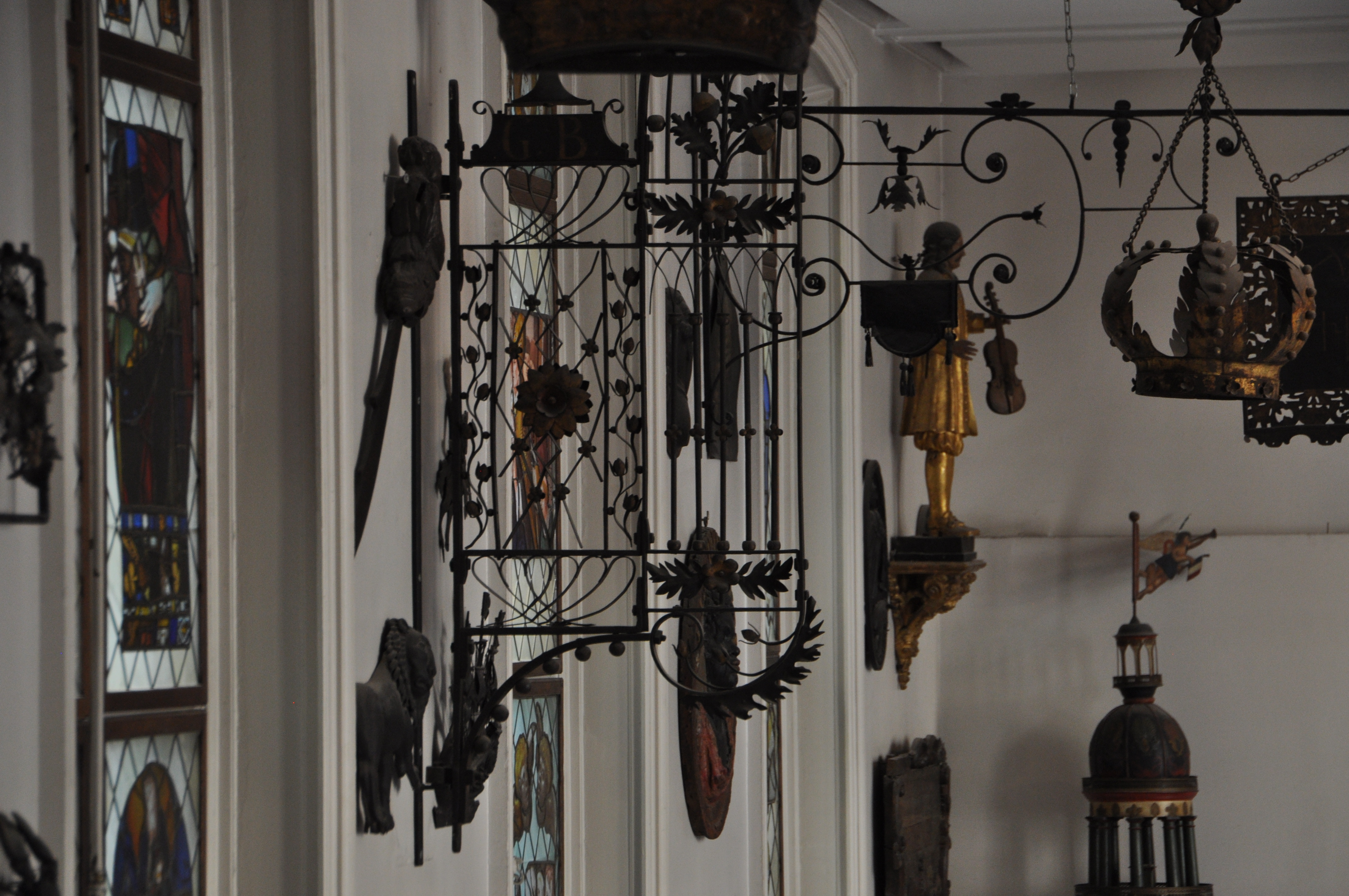
Gallery of shop signs

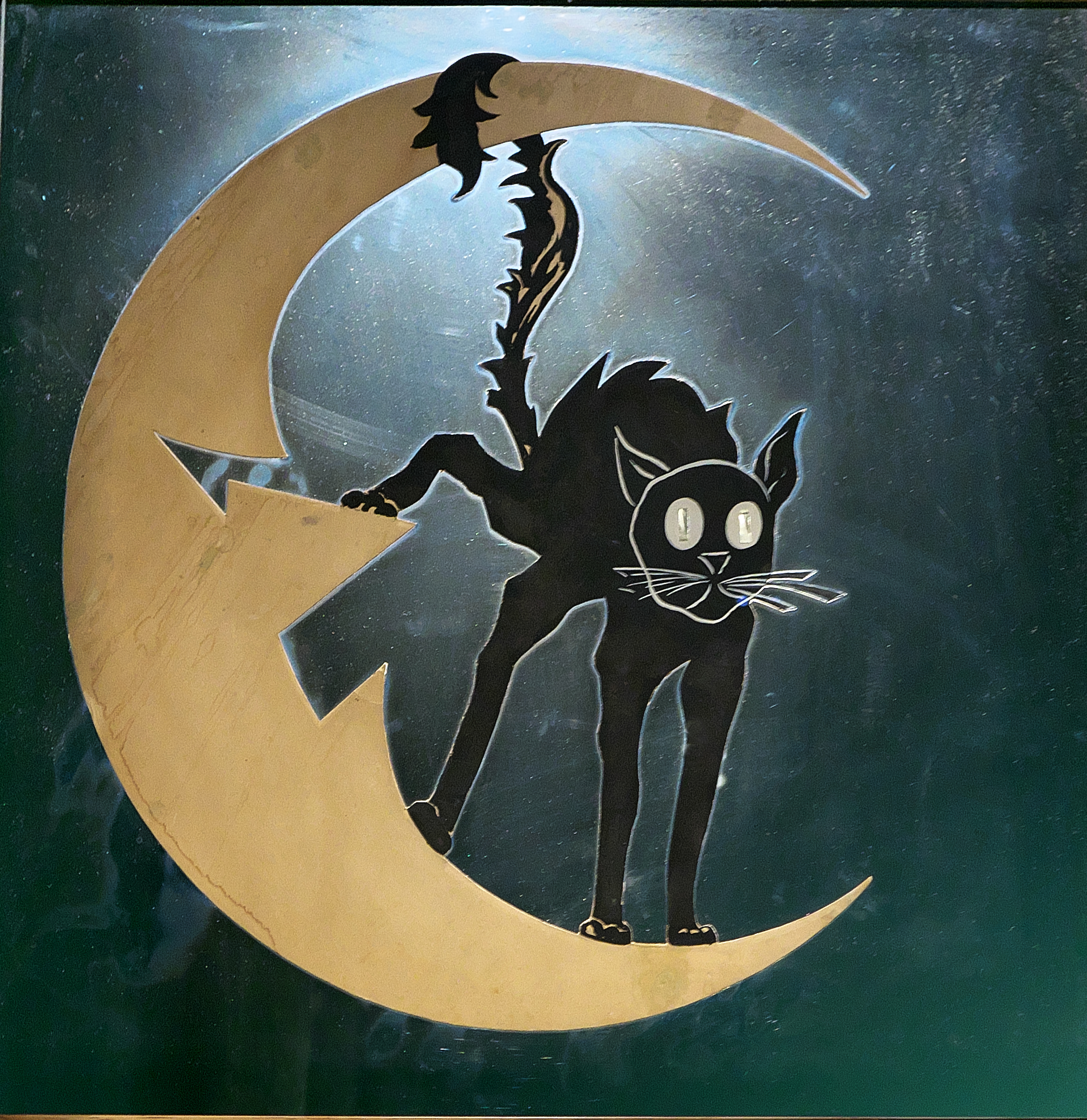
Sign of Le Chat Noir, a popular 19th century cabaret

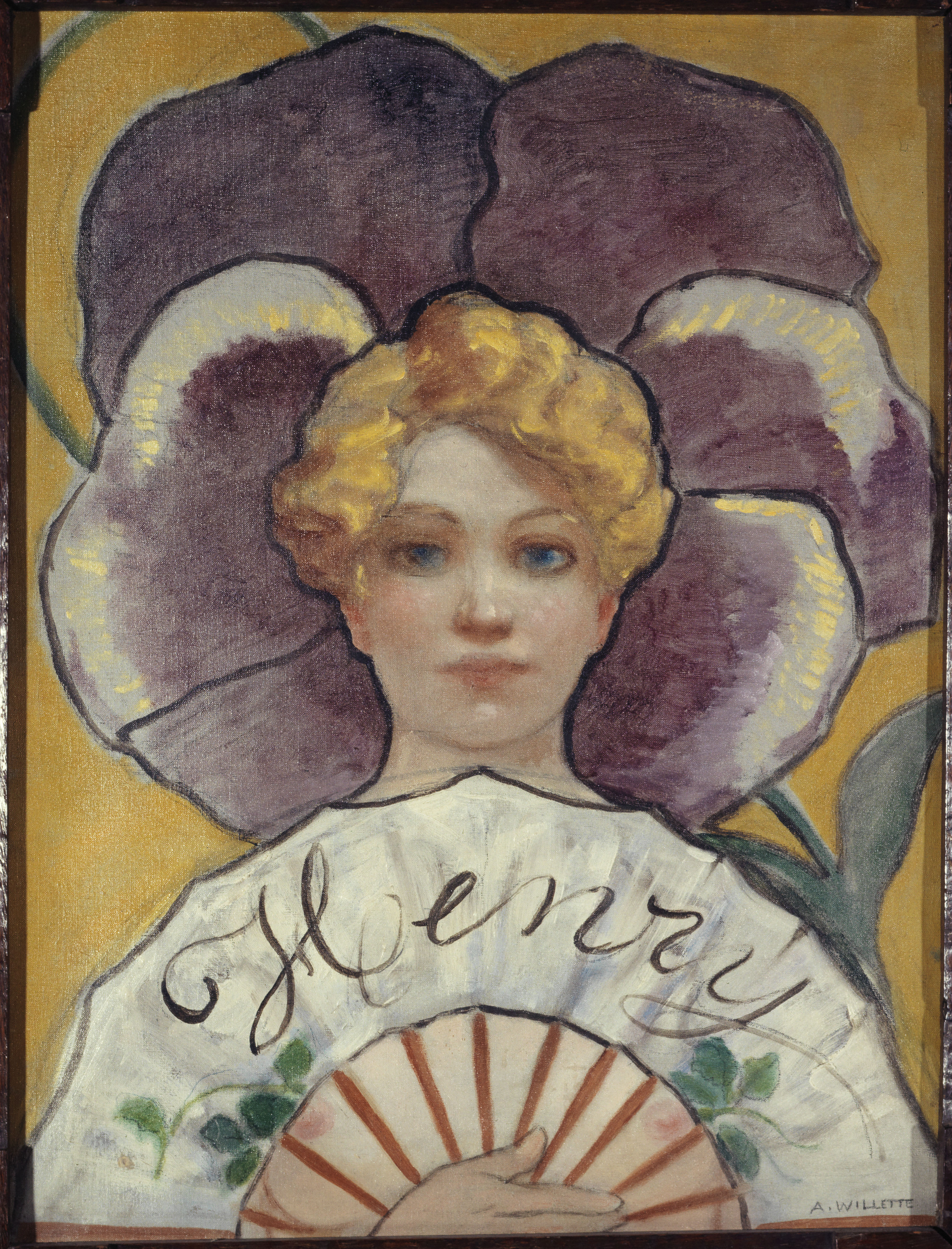
Shop sign for the boutique La Maison Henry, on rue de Faubourg Saint-Honoré (c. 1900)

Two unusual galleries in the museum display the distinctive signs that hung in front of Paris shops in the 18th and 19th centuries, illustrating the profession or the product of the shopkeeper. These range from the signs of wigmakers, locksmiths and the makers of eyeglasses, illustrating their products, to the black cat of the "Le Chat Noir" cabaret in Montmartre in 1881, a popular meeting place for artists, and a model of the Bastille for an early 19th-century cafe of that name in the 11th arrondissement.

== See also ==
- History of Paris
- Jean-François Eugène Robinet, curator from 1891
- Jean Robiquet, curator in the first half of the 20th century
- List of museums in Paris

== Bibliography ==
- Guillaume, Valérie, Musée Carnavalet - Histoire de Paris - Guide de visite, July 2021, Éditions Paris Musées, Paris, (in French) ISBN 978-2-7596-0474-6
- Pommereau, Claude, Musée Carnavalet: Histoire de Paris (May 2021), Beaux Arts Éditions, Paris (in French) ISBN 979-10-204-0614-9
- Colson, Jean. Paris: Des Origines à Nos jours. Paris: Éditions Hervas, 1998.
- Hillairet, Jacques, Connaissance du Vieux Paris, (2017), Éditions Payot et Rivages, Paris (in French), ISBN 978-2-22891-911-1
- Leri, Jean-Marc. Musée Carnavalet: Histoire de Paris. Paris:Éditions Fragments International, 2007.
- Schama, Simon. Citizens: A Chronicle of the French Revolution. New York: Alfred A. Knopf, 1989.
- "Taking in Paris Any Day, Any Century". New York Times. January 9, 2013.
