= Cousin Bette =

1847 novel by Honoré de Balzac

La Cousine Bette
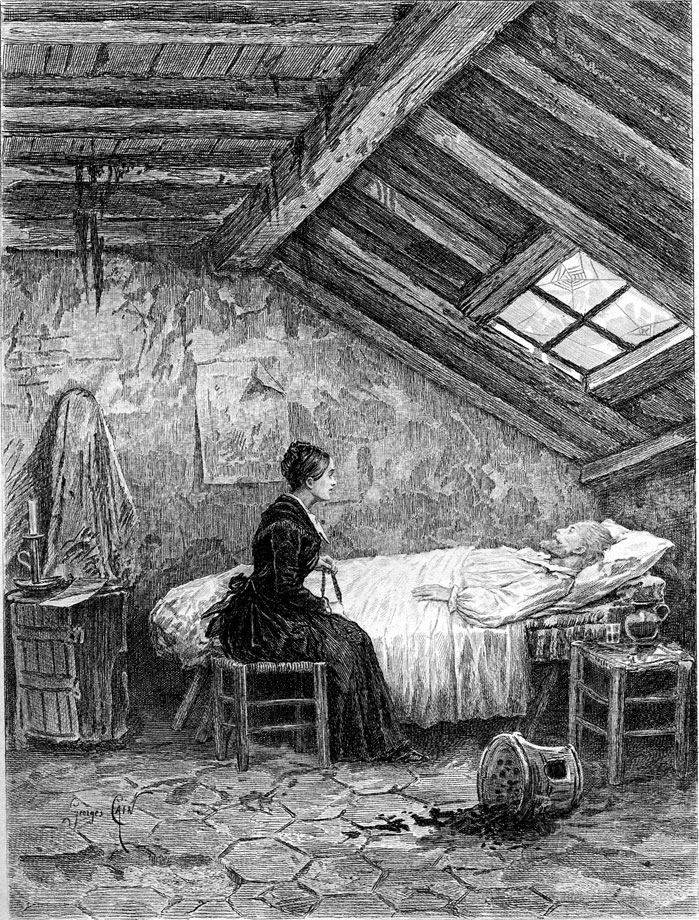
- Illustration from an 1897 edition by Georges Cain
- Author: Honoré de Balzac
- Language: French
- Series: La Comédie humaine
- Published: 1846–1847 (Boniface)
- Publication place: France
- Preceded by: Le Cousin Pons
- Followed by: Un prince de la bohème

La Cousine Bette (French pronunciation: [la kuzin bɛt], Cousin Bette) is an 1847 novel by French author Honoré de Balzac. Set in mid-19th-century Paris, it tells the story of an unmarried middle-aged woman who plots the destruction of her extended family. Bette works with Valérie Marneffe, an unhappily married young lady, to seduce and torment a series of men. One of these is Baron Hector Hulot, husband to Bette's cousin Adeline. He sacrifices his family's fortune and good name to please Valérie, who leaves him for a well-off merchant named Crevel. The book is part of the Scènes de la vie parisienne section of Balzac's novel sequence La Comédie humaine ("The Human Comedy").

In the 1840s, a serial format known as the roman-feuilleton was highly popular in France, and the most acclaimed expression of it was the socialist writing of Eugène Sue. Balzac wanted to challenge Sue's supremacy, and prove himself the most capable feuilleton author in France. Writing quickly and with intense focus, Balzac produced La Cousine Bette, one of his longest novels, in two months. It was published in Le Constitutionnel at the end of 1846, then collected with a companion work, Le Cousin Pons, the following year.

The novel's characters represent polarities of contrasting morality. The vengeful Bette and disingenuous Valérie stand on one side, with the merciful Adeline and her patient daughter Hortense on the other. The patriarch of the Hulot family, meanwhile, is consumed by his own sexual desire. Hortense's husband, the Polish exile Wenceslas Steinbock, represents artistic genius, though he succumbs to uncertainty and lack of motivation. Balzac based the character of Bette in part on his mother and the poet Marceline Desbordes-Valmore. At least one scene involving Baron Hulot was likely based on an event in the life of Balzac's friend, the novelist Victor Hugo.

La Cousine Bette is considered Balzac's last great work. His trademark use of realist detail combines with a panorama of characters returning from earlier novels. Several critics have hailed it as a turning point in the author's career, and others have called it a prototypical naturalist text. It has been compared to William Shakespeare's Othello as well as Leo Tolstoy's War and Peace. The novel explores themes of vice and virtue, as well as the influence of money on French society. Bette's relationship with Valérie is also seen as an important exploration of homoerotic themes. A number of film versions of the story have been produced, including a 1971 BBC mini-series starring Margaret Tyzack and Helen Mirren, and a 1998 feature film with Jessica Lange in the title role.

== Background ==
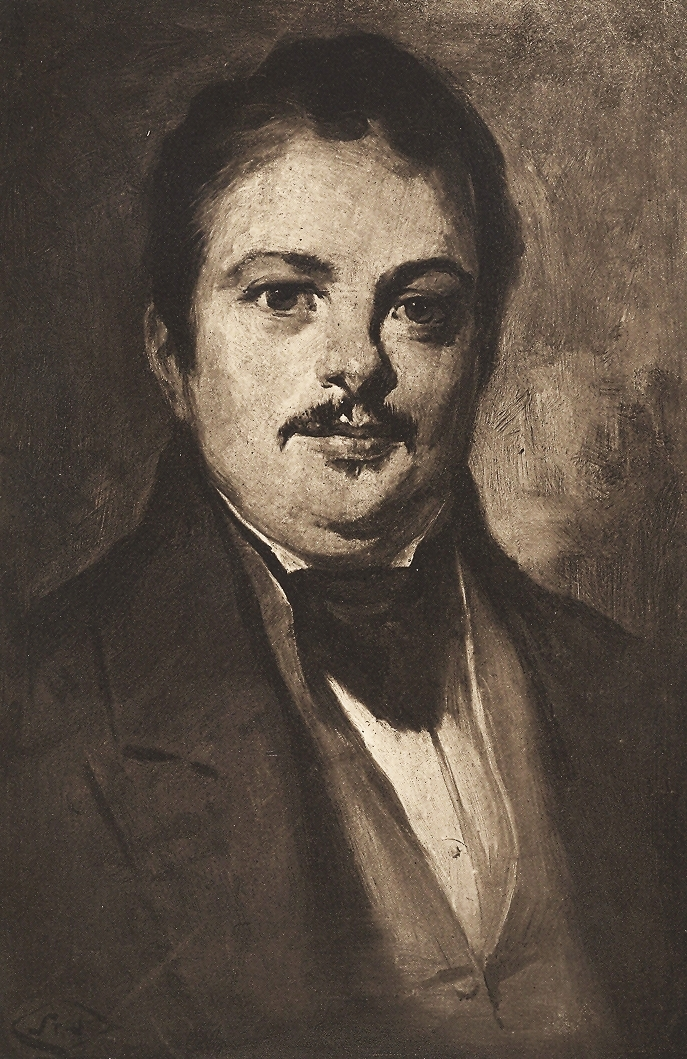
In her second anonymous letter, Ewelina Hańska told Balzac: "Your soul embraces centuries, monsieur."

By 1846 Honoré de Balzac had achieved tremendous fame as a writer, but his finances and health were deteriorating rapidly. After writing a series of potboiler novels in the 1820s, he published his first book under his own name, Les Chouans ("The Chouans"), in 1829. He followed this with dozens of well-received novels and stories, including La Peau de chagrin ("The Magic Skin"), in 1831, Le Père Goriot ("Father Goriot") in 1835, and the two-volume Illusions perdues ("Lost Illusions"), in 1837 and 1839. Because of his lavish lifestyle and penchant for financial speculation, he spent most of his life trying to repay a variety of debts. He wrote tirelessly, driven as much by economic necessity as by the muse and black coffee. This regimen of constant work exhausted his body and brought reprimands from his doctor.

As his work gained recognition, Balzac began corresponding with a Polish baroness named Ewelina Hańska, who first contacted him through an anonymous 1832 letter signed "L'Étrangère" ("The Stranger"). They developed an affectionate friendship in letters, and when she became a widow in 1841, Balzac sought her hand in marriage. He visited her often in Poland and Germany, but various complications prohibited their union. One of these was an affair Balzac had with his housekeeper, Louise Breugniot. As she became aware of his affection for Mme. Hanska, Breugniot stole a collection of their letters and used them to extort money from Balzac. Even after this episode, he grew closer to Mme. Hanska with each visit and by 1846 he had begun preparing a home to share with her. He grew hopeful that they could marry when she became pregnant, but she fell ill in December and suffered a miscarriage.

The mid-19th century was a time of profound transformation in French government and society. The reign of King Charles X ended in 1830 when a wave of agitation and dissent forced him to abdicate. He was replaced by Louis-Philippe, who named himself "King of the French", rather than the standard "King of France" – an indication that he answered more to the nascent bourgeoisie than the aristocratic Ancien Régime. The change in government took place while the economy in France was moving from mercantilism to industrial development. This opened new opportunities for individuals hoping to acquire wealth and led to significant changes in social norms. Members of the aristocracy, for example, were forced to relate socially to the nouveau riche, usually with tense results. The democratic spirit of the French Revolution also affected social interactions, with a shift in popular allegiance away from the church and the monarchy.

In the mid-19th century, a new style of the novel became popular in France. The serial format known as the roman-feuilleton presented stories in short regular installments, often accompanied by melodramatic plots and stock characters. Although Balzac's La Vieille Fille (The Old Maid), 1836, was the first such work published in France, the roman-feuilleton gained prominence thanks mostly to his friends Eugène Sue and Alexandre Dumas, père. Balzac disliked their serial writing, especially Sue's socialist depiction of lower-class suffering. Balzac wanted to dethrone what he called "les faux dieux de cette littérature bâtarde" ("the false gods of this bastard literature"). He also wanted to show the world that, despite his poor health and tumultuous career, he was "plus jeune, plus frais, et plus grand que jamais" ("younger, fresher, and greater than ever"). His first efforts to render a quality feuilleton were unsuccessful. Even though Splendeurs et misères des courtisanes ("A Harlot High and Low"), published in segments from 1838 to 1847, was celebrated by critics, Balzac complained to Mme. Hanska that he was "doing pure Sue". He tried again in 1844 with Modeste Mignon, but public reactions were mixed. Two years later Balzac began a new project, determined to create something from his "own old pen again".

== Writing and publication ==
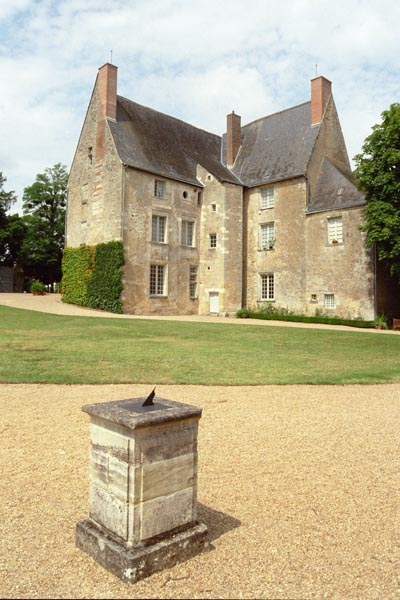
Balzac first visited the Château de Saché in 1832, when he wrote the autobiographical novel Louis Lambert.

After resting for a week in June 1846 at the Château de Saché in Tours, Balzac returned to Paris and began working on a short story called "Le Parasite", which he eventually developed into the novel Le Cousin Pons. He intended from the start to pair it with another novel, collecting them under the title Les Parents pauvres ("The Poor Relations"). He based the second book on a story his sister Laure Surville had written called "La Cousine Rosalie" and published in 1844 in Le Journal des enfants. Writing intensively, he produced the entire novel, named La Cousine Bette after the main character, in two months. This was a significant accomplishment owing to his bad health, but its length made Balzac's writing speed especially remarkable. One critic calls the writing of Les Parents pauvres Balzac's "last explosion of creative energy". Another suggests that this effort was "almost the last straw which broke down Balzac's gigantic strength".

Balzac's usual mode of revision involved vast, complicated edits made to galley proofs he received from the printer. When creating La Cousine Bette, however, he submitted the work to his editor piece by piece, without viewing a single proof. The book was serialized in Le Constitutionnel from 8 October to 3 December, and Balzac rushed to keep up with the newspaper's rapid printing schedule. He produced an average of eight pages each day, but was struck by the unexpected enormity of the story as it evolved. Balzac was paid 12,836 francs for the series, which was later published with Le Cousin Pons as a twelve-volume book by Chiendowski and Pétion. The first collected edition of La Cousine Bette was organized into 132 chapters, but these divisions were removed when Balzac added it to his massive collection La Comédie humaine in 1848.

== Plot summary ==
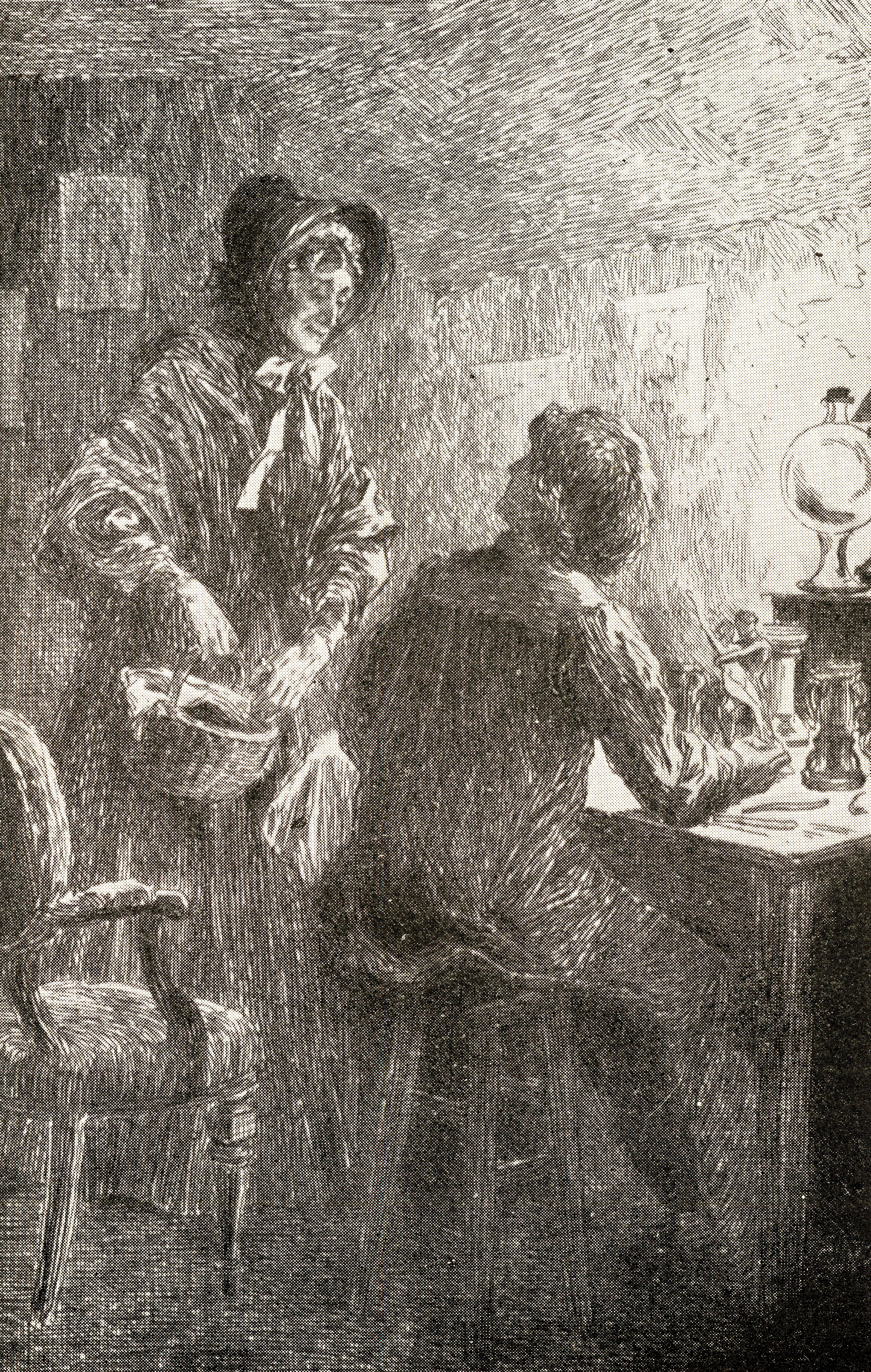
While caring for him, Bette refers to Wenceslas Steinbock as "mon enfant ... un garçon qui se relève du cercueil" ("my child ... a son risen from the grave").

Adeline Hulot – wife of the successful Baron Hector Hulot – is being pressured into an affair by Célestin Crevel, a wealthy perfumer. His desire stems in part from an earlier contest in which the adulterous Baron Hulot had won the attentions of singer Josépha Mirah, also favored by Crevel. Mme. Hulot rejects Crevel's advances. The Baron has so completely lavished money on Josépha that he has borrowed heavily from his Uncle Johann – and, unable to repay the money, the Baron instead arranges a War Department post in Algeria for Johann, with instructions that Johann will be in a situation in that job to embezzle the borrowed money. The Hulots' daughter, Hortense, has begun searching for a husband; their son Victorin is married to Crevel's daughter Celestine.

Mme. Hulot's cousin, Bette (also called Lisbeth), harbors a hidden resentment of her relatives' success, especially of Hortense 'stealing' Bette's intended sweetheart. A peasant woman with none of the physical beauty of her cousin, Bette has rejected various marriage proposals from middle-class suitors who were clearly motivated by her connection to the Hulots, and remains unmarried at the age of 42. One day, she comes upon a young unsuccessful Polish sculptor named Wenceslas Steinbock, attempting suicide in the tiny apartment upstairs from her own. As she nourishes him back to health, she develops a fondness for him. Bette is living in a modest apartment in a lodging house shared by the Marneffe couple. Bette befriends Valérie (née Fortin), the young wife of a War Department clerk, Jean-Paul-Stanislas Marneffe; the two women form a bond to attain their separate goals – for Valérie the acquisition of money and valuables, for Bette the ruination of the Hulot household by means of Valérie's luring both the Baron and Steinbock into infidelity and financial ruin.

Baron Hulot, meanwhile, is rejected by Josépha, who explains that she has chosen another man because of his larger fortune. Hulot's despair is alleviated when he visits Bette in her lodging and there meets and falls in love with Valérie Marneffe. He showers her with gifts, and soon establishes a luxurious house for her and M. Marneffe, with whom he works at the War Department (Bette joins them in their new home, to serve as an excuse for the Baron's visits). These debts, compounded by the money he borrowed to lavish on Josépha, threaten the Hulot family's financial security. Panicked, he convinces his uncle Johann Fischer to quietly embezzle funds from a War Department outpost in Algiers. Hulot's woes are momentarily abated and Bette's happiness is shattered, when Hortense Hulot marries Wenceslas Steinbock.

Crushed at having lost Steinbock's as her intended spouse, Bette swears vengeance on the Hulot family. Her strategy is to work on Baron Hulot's demonstrated weakness for acquiring and lavishing more money than he has on young mistresses. Soon the Baron is completely besotted – and financially over-extended – with Valérie, and compromised by repeatedly promoting her husband within the Baron's section of the War Department. Before long, Bette has already contrived to have Crevel and Steinbock also ensnared by Valérie's charms. Hortense discovers Steinbock's infidelity and returns to her mother's home. Before long, the Baron's misconduct becomes known to the War Department; Uncle Johann is arrested in Algeria and commits suicide, the Baron is forced to retire, his brother, a famous war hero, saves him from prison and then dies of shame over the family disgrace. The Baron deserts his family and hides from his creditors. It appears that Valérie, soon a widow, will marry Crevel and thus gain entrance to the Hulot family as Celestine's mother-in-law. In short, the family is devastated by these repeated blows – and Bette's machinations are concealed from them.

== Characters and inspirations ==
The death of Marshal Hulot has been called "one of the most moving in all of Balzac".

Balzac had written more than seventy novels when he began La Cousine Bette, and populated them with recurring characters. Many of the characters in the novel, therefore, appear with extensive back-stories and biographical depth. For example, Célestin Crevel first appeared in Balzac's 1837 novel César Birotteau, working for the title character. Having accumulated a considerable fortune in that book, Crevel spends his time in La Cousine Bette enjoying the spoils of his labor. Another important recurring character is Marshal Hulot, who first appeared as a colonel in Les Chouans. In the years between that story and La Cousine Bette, he became the Count of Forzheim; in a letter to the Constitutionnel, Balzac described how Marshal Hulot gained this title. The presence of Crevel and Marshal Hulot – among others – in La Cousine Bette allows a continuation of each character's life story, adding emphasis or complexity to earlier events.

Other recurring characters appear only briefly in La Cousine Bette; previous appearances, however, give deep significance to the characters' presence. This is the case with Vautrin, the criminal mastermind who tutors young Eugene de Rastignac in Balzac's 1835 novel Le Père Goriot. When he resurfaces in La Cousine Bette, he has joined the police and introduces the Hulot family to his aunt, Mme. Nourrison, who offers a morally questionable remedy for their woes. Although Vautrin's presence in La Cousine Bette is brief, his earlier adventures in Le Père Goriot provide instant recognition and emotional texture. Elsewhere, Balzac presents an entire world of experience by including characters from a particular sphere of society. For example, several scenes feature artists like Jean-Jacques Bixiou, who first appeared in 1837's Les Employés and in many other books thereafter. The world of Parisian nightlife is quickly brought to mind with the inclusion of several characters from Les Comédiens sans le savoir (1846), and Bianchon appears – as always – when a doctor is needed.

Balzac's use of recurring characters has been identified as a unique component of his fiction. It enables a depth of characterization that goes beyond simple narration or dialogue. "When the characters reappear", notes the critic Samuel Rogers, "they do not step out of nowhere; they emerge from the privacy of their own lives which, for an interval, we have not been allowed to see." Some readers are intimidated by the depth created by these interdependent stories, and feel deprived of important context for the characters. Detective novelist Arthur Conan Doyle said that he never tried to read Balzac, because he "did not know where to begin". The characterization in La Cousine Bette is considered especially skillful. Anthony Pugh, in his book Balzac's Recurring Characters, says that the technique is employed "for the most part without that feeling of self-indulgence that mars some of Balzac's later work. Almost every example arises quite naturally out of the situation." Biographer Noel Gerson calls the characters in La Cousine Bette "among the most memorable Balzac ever sketched".

=== Bette Fischer ===
Lisbeth Fischer (Cousin Bette) is described as "maigre, brune ... les sourcils épais et réunis par un bouquet ... quelques verrues dans sa face longue et simiesque" ("lean, brown, with ... thick eyebrows joining in a tuft ... and some moles on her narrow simian face").

Descriptions of Bette are often connected to savagery and animal imagery. Her name, for example, is a homophone in French for "bête" ("beast"). One passage explains that "elle ressemblait aux singes habillés en femmes" ("she sometimes looked like one of those monkeys in petticoats"); elsewhere her voice is described as having "une jalousie de tigre" ("tiger-like jealousy"). Her beastly rage comes to the surface with ferocity when she learns of Steinbock's engagement to Hortense:

La physionomie de la Lorraine était devenue terrible. Ses yeux noirs et pénétrants avaient la fixité de ceux des tigres. Sa figure ressemblait à celles que nous supposons aux pythonisses, elle serrait les dents pour les empêcher de claquer, et une affreuse convulsion faisait trembler ses membres. Elle avait glissé sa main crochue entre son bonnet et ses cheveux pour les empoigner et soutenir sa tête, devenue trop lourde; elle brûlait! La fumée de l'incendie qui la ravageait semblait passer par ses rides comme par autant de crevasses labourées par une éruption volcanique.

The peasant-woman's face was terrible; her piercing black eyes had the glare of the tiger's; her face was like that we ascribe to a pythoness; she set her teeth to keep them from chattering, and her whole frame quivered convulsively. She had pushed her clenched fingers under her cap to clutch her hair and support her head, which felt too heavy; she was on fire. The smoke of the flame that scorched her seemed to emanate from her wrinkles as from the crevasses rent by a volcanic eruption.

When she learns that her cousin Adeline has been welcoming Steinbock into the Hulot home, Bette swears revenge: "Adeline! se dit Lisbeth, ô Adeline, tu me le payeras, je te rendrai plus laide que moi!" ("'Adeline!' muttered Lisbeth. 'Oh, Adeline, you shall pay for this! I will make you uglier than I am.'") Her cruelty and lust for revenge lead critics to call her "demonic" and "one of Balzac's most terrifying creations". Because of her willingness to manipulate the people around her, Bette has been compared to Iago in William Shakespeare's play Othello. Her fierce persona is attributed partly to her peasant background, and partly to her virginity, which provides (according to Balzac) "une force diabolique ou la magie noire de la volonté" ("diabolical strength, or the black magic of the Will").

In a letter to Mme. Hanska, Balzac indicated that he based the character of Bette on three women from his life: his mother, Mme. Hanska's aunt Rosalie Rzewuska, and the poet Marceline Desbordes-Valmore. Balzac had a tumultuous relationship with his mother for most of his life, and he incorporated some of her personality (particularly her "obstinate persistence in living", as one critic calls it) into Bette. Rosalie Rzewuska disapproved of Mme. Hanska's relationship with Balzac; biographers agree that her cold determination was part of the author's recipe for Bette. Elements taken from Marceline Desbordes-Valmore are more complex; she faced many setbacks in life and she and Balzac became friends after she left the theatre to take up poetry.

=== Valérie Marneffe ===
Bette's co-conspirator in the destruction of the Hulot family is beautiful and greedy Valérie Marneffe, the unsatisfied wife of a War Department clerk. They develop a deep friendship, which many critics consider an example of lesbian affection. Because of their relationship and similar goals, the critic Frederic Jameson says that "Valérie serves as a kind of emanation of Bette".

Valérie Marneffe "attirait tous les regards, excitait tous les désirs, dans le cercle où elle rayonnait" ("attracted every eye, and excited every desire in the circle she shone upon").

Valérie is repulsed by her ugly husband and has gone five years without kissing him. She explains bluntly that her position as a married woman provides subtleties and options unavailable to the common prostitute who has one set price; after Marneffe dies, Valérie jockeys for position between Hulot and Montés (while also sleeping with Steinbock), then discards them all to marry Crevel, who offers the most wealth. She amuses herself by mocking her lovers' devotion, and this wickedness – not to mention her gruesome demise – has led some critics to speculate that she is actually the focus of Balzac's morality tale.

In one important scene, Valérie models for Steinbock as Delilah, standing victorious over the ruined Samson. With obvious parallels to her own activities, she describes her vision for the piece: "Il s'agit d'exprimer la puissance de la femme. Samson n'est rien, là. C'est le cadavre de la force. Dalila, c'est la passion qui ruine tout." ("What you have to show is the power of woman. Samson is a secondary consideration. He is the corpse of dead strength. It is Delilah—passion—that ruins everything.")

Although Balzac did not draw specifically from the women in his life to create Valérie, parallels have been observed in some areas. The tumultuous end of his affair with Louise Breugniot and the advantage she gains from his devotion to Mme. Hanska is similar in some ways to Valérie's manipulation of Steinbock. Critics also connect the pride and anguish felt by Balzac during Mme. Hanska's pregnancy and miscarriage to the same emotions felt by Baron Hulot when Valérie conceives and loses her child. Although he never ascribed to Mme. Hanska any of the traits in Valérie's treacherous character, he felt a devotion similar to that of Hulot. He once wrote to her: "je fais pour mon Eve toute les folies qu'un Hulot fait pour une Marneffe, je te donnerai mon sang, mon honneur, ma vie" ("I commit for [you] all the follies that a Hulot commits for Madame Marneffe; I give you my blood, my honor, my life").

=== Hector and Adeline Hulot ===
Baron Hector Hulot is a living manifestation of male sexual desire, unrestrained and unconcerned with its consequences for the man or his family. As the novel progresses, he becomes consumed by his libido, even in a physical sense. When Valérie tells him to stop dyeing his hair, he does so to please her. His financial woes and public disgrace lead him to flee his own home; by the end of the book he is an elderly, decrepit shell of a man. Baron Hulot is so overcome by his taste for female flesh that he even asks his wife – without irony – if he can bring home his fifteen-year-old mistress.

Adeline Hulot, on the other hand, is mercy personified. Like her cousin Bette, she comes from a peasant background, but has internalized the ideals of 19th-century womanhood, including devotion, grace, and deference. She reveals in the first scene that she has known for years about her husband's infidelities, but refuses to condemn him. Adeline's forgiving nature is often considered a significant character flaw. Some suggest that she is partly to blame for Hulot's wandering affection. C.A. Prendergast, for example, calls her forgiveness "an inadequate and even positively disastrous response" to her situation. He further suggests that Adeline, by choosing the role of quiet and dutiful wife, has excised from herself the erotic power to which the Baron is drawn. "[O]ne could at the very least offer the tentative speculation that Hulot's obsessional debauchery is in part the result of a certain poverty in Adeline, that the terrible logic of Hulot's excess is partially shaped by a crucial deficiency in his wife." Others are less accusatory; Adeline's nearly infinite mercy, they say, is evidence of foolishness. Critic Herbert J. Hunt declares that she shows "more imbecility than Christian patience", and David Bellos points out that, like her husband, she is driven by passion – albeit of a different kind: "Adeline's desire (for good, for the family, for Hector, for God) is so radically different from the motivating desires of the other characters that she seems in their context to be without desire ..."

Balzac's inspiration for the characters of Hector and Adeline remain unclear, but several critics have been eager to speculate. Three officers named Hulot were recognized for their valor in the Napoleonic Wars, and some suggest that Balzac borrowed the name of Comte Hector d'Aure. None of these men, however, were known for the sort of philandering or thievery exhibited by Baron Hulot in the novel. Instead, Balzac may have used himself as the model; his many affairs with women across the social spectrum lead some to suggest that the author "found much of Hulot in himself". Balzac's friend Victor Hugo, meanwhile, was famously discovered in bed with his mistress in July 1845. The similarity of his name to Hector Hulot (and that of his wife's maiden name, Adèle Foucher, to Adeline Fischer) has been posited as a possible indication of the characters' origins.

=== Wenceslas Steinbock ===
"Quoique Steinbock eût vingt-neuf ans, il paraissait, comme certains blonds, avoir cinq ou six ans de moins ... cette jeunesse ... avait cédé sous les fatigues et les misères de l'exil" ("Though Steinbock was nine-and-twenty, like many fair men, he looked five or six years younger ... his youth ... had faded under the fatigue and stress of life in exile".)

The Polish sculptor Wenceslas Steinbock is important primarily because of Bette's attachment to him. He offers Bette a source of pride, a way for her to prove herself worthy of her family's respect. When Hortense marries Steinbock, Bette feels as though she has been robbed. Prendergast insists that the incident "must literally be described as an act of theft".

Steinbock's relevance also lies in his background and profession, illustrating Balzac's conception of the Polish people, as well as himself. Having spent more than a decade befriending Mme. Hanska and visiting her family in Poland, Balzac believed he had insight into the national character (as he felt about most groups he observed). Thus, descriptions of Steinbock are often laced with commentary about the Polish people: "Soyez mon amie, dit-il avec une de ces démonstrations caressantes si familières aux Polonais, et qui les font accuser assez injustement de servilité." ("'Be my sweetheart,' he added, with one of the caressing gestures familiar to the Poles, for which they are unjustly accused of servility.")

Critics also consider Steinbock important because of his artistic genius. Like Louis Lambert and Lucien Chardon in Illusions perdues, he is a brilliant man – just as Balzac considered himself to be. Before he is nurtured and directed by Bette, Steinbock's genius languishes under his own inertia and he attempts suicide. Later, when he leaves Bette's circle of influence, he fails again. Thus he demonstrates Balzac's conviction that genius alone is useless without determination. Bellos organizes Steinbock and Bette into a duality of weakness and strength; whereas the Polish artist is unable to direct his energies into productive work, Bette draws strength from her virginity and thus becomes powerful by denying the lust to which Steinbock falls prey. Steinbock's drive is further eroded by the praise he receives for his art, which gives him an inflated sense of accomplishment. One critic refers to the artist's downfall as "vanity ... spoiled by premature renown".

== Style ==
If Balzac's goal was (as he claimed) to write a realist novel from his "own old pen" rather than mimic the style of Eugène Sue, history and literary criticism have declared him successful. William Stowe calls La Cousine Bette "a masterpiece of classical realism" and Bellos refers to it as "one of the great achievements of nineteenth-century realism", comparing it to War and Peace. Some sections of the book are criticized for being melodramatic, and Balzac biographer V. S. Pritchett even refers to a representative excerpt as "bad writing". Most critics consider the moralistic elements of the novel deceptively complex, and some point out that the roman-feuilleton format required a certain level of titillation to keep readers engaged. Others indicate that Balzac's interest in the theatre was an important reason for the inclusion of melodramatic elements.

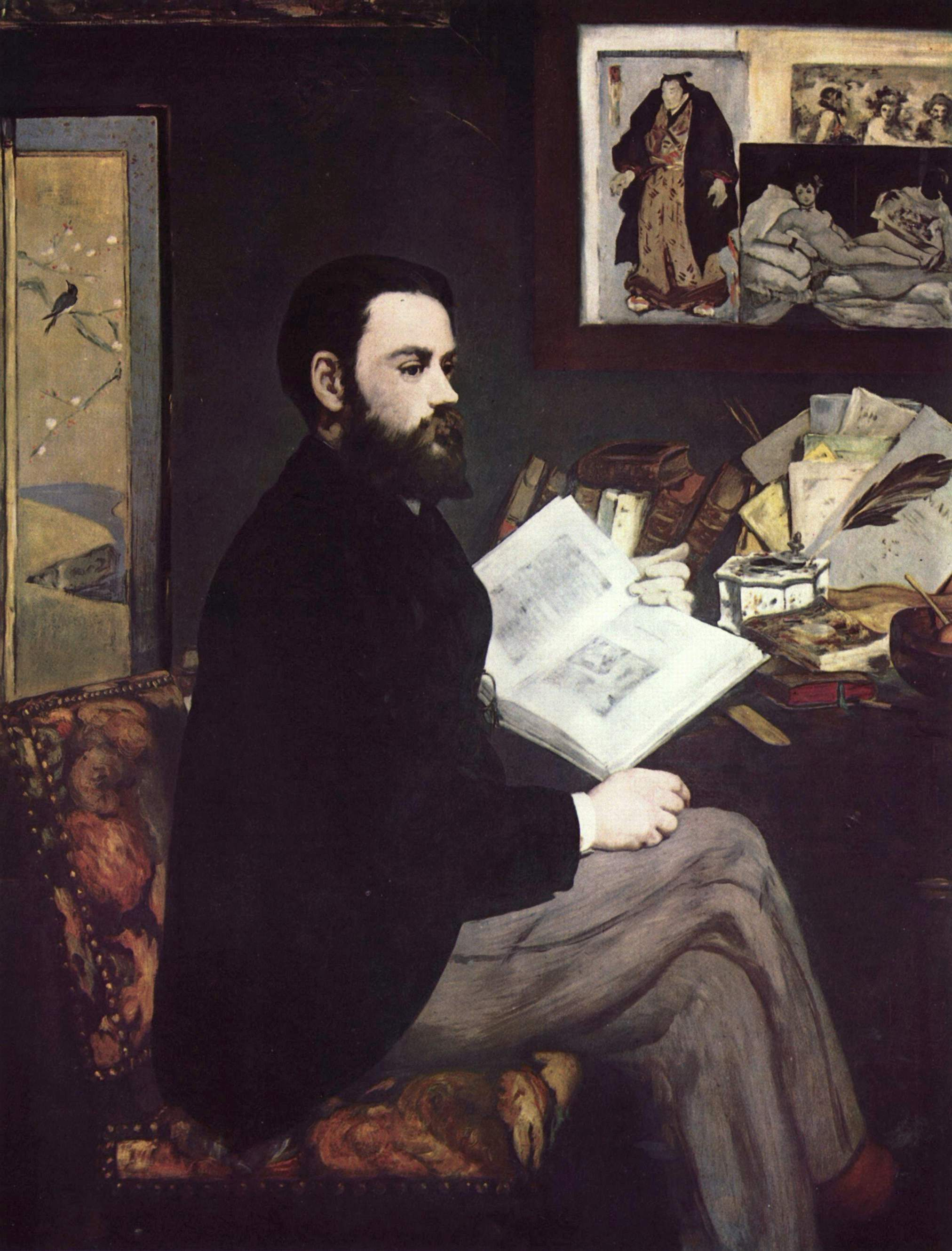
Émile Zola said that Balzac's fiction was "uniquement le compte-rendu brutal de ce que l'écrivain a observé" ("uniquely the brutal report of what the writer has observed").

Balzac's trademark realism begins on the first page of the novel, wherein Crevel is described wearing a National Guard uniform, complete with the Légion d'honneur. Details from the 1830s also appear in the novel's geographic locations. The Hulot family home, for example, is found in the aristocratic area of Paris known as the Faubourg Saint-Germain. Bette's residence is on the opposite end of the social spectrum, in the impoverished residential area which surrounded the Louvre: "Les ténèbres, le silence, l'air glacial, la profondeur caverneuse du sol concourent à faire de ces maisons des espèces de cryptes, des tombeaux vivants." ("Darkness, silence, an icy chill, and the cavernous depth of the soil combine to make these houses a kind of crypt, tombs of the living.") Descriptions of her meager quarters are – as usual in Balzac's work – an acute reflection of her personality. The same is true of the Marneffe home at the outset: it contains "les trompeuses apparences de ce faux luxe" ("the illusory appearance of sham luxury"), from the shabby chairs in the drawing-room to the dust-coated bedroom.

Precise detail is not spared in descriptions of decay and disease, two vivid elements in the novel. Marneffe, for example, represents crapulence. His decrepit body is a symbol of society's weakness at the time, worn away from years of indulgence. The poison which kills Valérie and Crevel is also described in ghastly detail. The doctor Bianchon explains: "Ses dents et ses cheveux tombent, elle a l'aspect des lépreux, elle se fait horreur à elle-même; ses mains, épouvantables à voir, sont enflées et couvertes de pustules verdâtres; les ongles déchaussés restent dans les plaies qu'elle gratte; enfin, toutes les extrémités se détruisent dans la sanie qui les ronge." ("She is losing her hair and teeth, her skin is like a leper's, she is a horror to herself; her hands are horrible, covered with greenish pustules, her nails are loose, and the flesh is eaten away by the poisoned humors.")

La Cousine Bette is unapologetic in its bleak outlook, and makes blunt connections between characters' origins and behavior. For these reasons, it is considered a key antecedent to naturalist literature. Novelist Émile Zola called it an important "roman expérimental" ("experimental novel"), and praised its acute exploration of the characters' motivations. Some critics note that La Cousine Bette showed an evolution in Balzac's style – one which he had little time to develop. Pointing to the nuance of plot and comprehensive narration style, Stowe suggests that the novel "might in happier circumstances have marked the beginning of a new, mature 'late Balzac'".

== Themes ==
=== Passion, vice, and virtue ===
Valérie's line about Delilah being "la passion qui ruine tout" ("passion which ruins everything") is symbolic, coming as it does from a woman whose passion accelerates the ruin of most people around her – including herself. Baron Hulot, meanwhile, is desire incarnate; his wandering libido bypasses concern for his wife, brother, children, finances, and even his own health. Bette is living vengeance, and Adeline desperately yearns for the happy home she imagined in the early years of marriage. Each character is driven by a fiery passion, which in most cases consumes the individual. As Balzac puts it: "La passion est un martyre." ("Passion is martyrdom.")

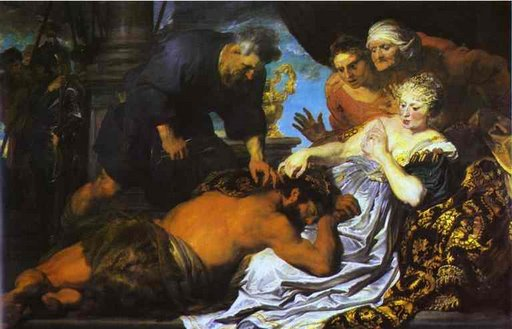
After acknowledging herself as Delilah, Valérie warns her guests: "Prenez garde à vos toupets, messieurs!" ("Take care of your wigs, gentlemen!")

The intensity of passion, and the consequences of its manifestation, result in a stark contrast of vice and virtue. Bette and Valérie are pure wickedness, and even celebrate the ruin of their targets. As one critic says, "life's truths are viewed in their most atrocious form". Mocking the use of the guillotine during the French Revolution while acknowledging her own malicious intent, Valérie says with regard to Delilah: "La vertu coupe la tête, le Vice ne vous coupe que les cheveux." ("Virtue cuts off your head; vice only cuts off your hair.") Hulot is not intentionally cruel, but his actions are no less devastating to the people around him.

On the other side of the moral divide, Adeline and her children stand as shining examples of virtue and nobility – or so it would seem. Hortense ridicules her aunt when Bette mentions her protégé Wenceslas Steinbock, providing a psychological catalyst for the ensuing conflict. Victorin repeatedly expresses outrage at his father's philandering, yet crosses a significant moral boundary when he agrees to fund Mme. Nourrison's plan to eradicate Valérie. As one critic puts it, Victorin's decision marks a point in the novel where "the scheme of right versus wrong immediately dissolves into a purely amoral conflict of different interests and passions, regulated less by a transcendent moral law than by the relative capacity of the different parties for cunning and ruthlessness." The cruelties of the Hulot children are brief but significant, owing as much to their obliviousness (intentional in the case of Victorin, who asks not to learn the details of Mme. Nourrison's scheme) as to malicious forethought.

The question of Adeline's virtue is similarly complicated. Although she is forgiving to the point of absurdity, she is often considered more of a dupe than a martyr. Some have compared her to Balzac's title character in Le Père Goriot, who sacrifices himself for his daughters. As Bellos puts it: "Adeline's complicity with Hector certainly makes her more interesting as a literary character, but it undermines her role as the symbol of virtue in the novel." This complicity reaches an apex when she unsuccessfully attempts to sell her affections to Crevel (who has since lost interest) in order to repay her husband's debts. Her flirtation with prostitution is sometimes considered more egregious than Valérie's overt extortion, since Adeline is soiling her own dignity in the service of Baron Hulot's infidelity. For the remainder of the novel, Adeline trembles uncontrollably, a sign of her weakness. Later, when she visits the singer Josépha (on whom her husband once doted), Adeline is struck by the splendor earned by a life of materialistic seduction. She wonders aloud if she is capable of providing the carnal pleasures Hulot seeks outside of their home.

Ultimately, both vice and virtue fail. Valérie is devoured by Montés' poison, a consequence of her blithe attitude toward his emotion. Bette is unsuccessful in her effort to crush her cousin's family, and dies (as one critic puts it) "in the margins". Adeline's Catholic mercy, on the other hand, fails to redeem her husband, and her children are similarly powerless – as Victorin finally admits on the novel's last page. Like Raphael de Valentin in Balzac's 1831 novel La Peau de chagrin, Hulot is left with nothing but "vouloir": desire, a force which is essential for human existence and eventually apocalyptic.

=== Gender and homoeroticism ===
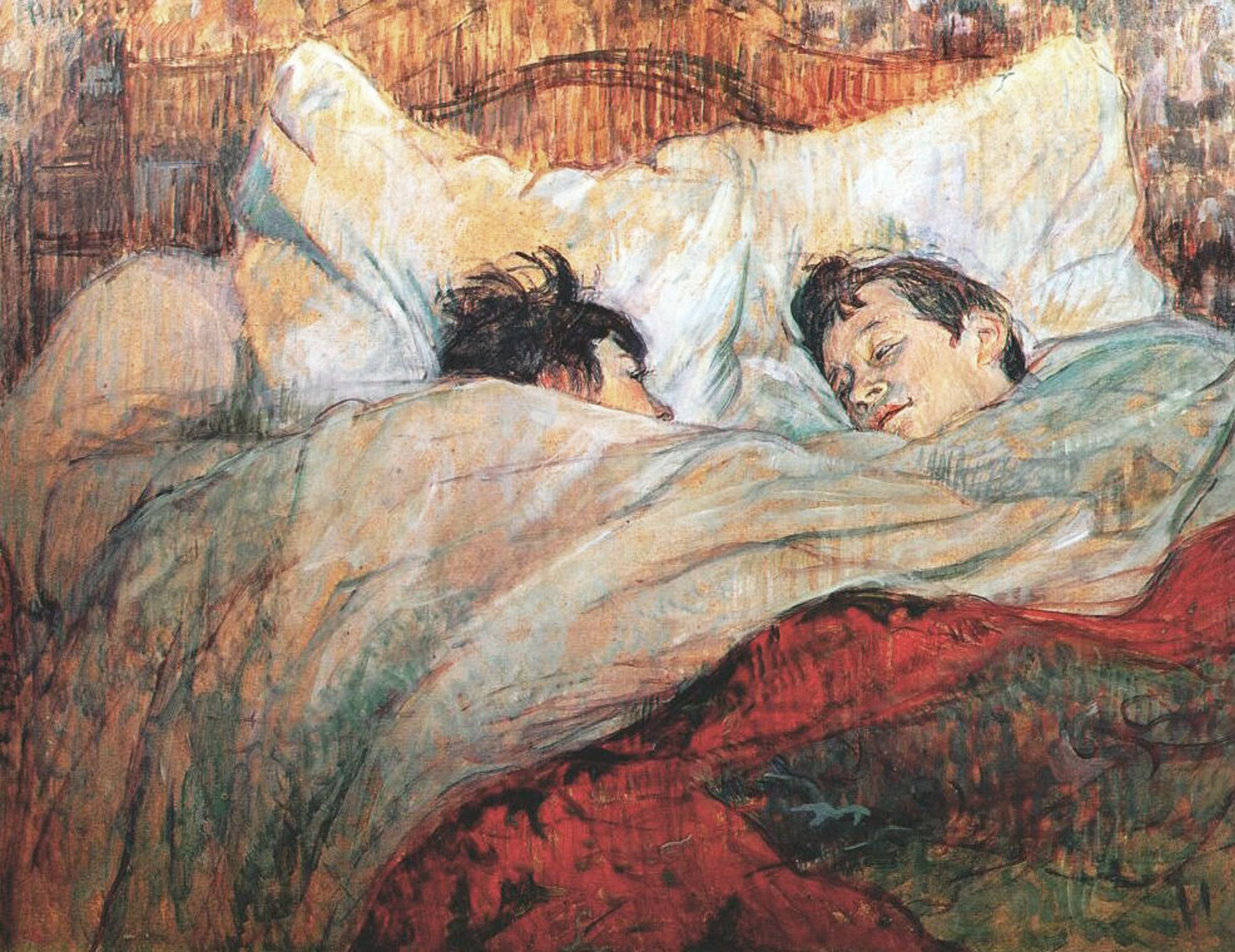
French painter Henri de Toulouse-Lautrec depicted lesbian relationships similar to (though more explicit than) that of Bette and Valérie, as in his 1893 painting In Bed.

Gender roles, especially the figure of the ideal woman, are central to La Cousine Bette. The four leading female characters (Bette, Valérie, Adeline, and Hortense) embody stereotypically feminine traits. Each pair of women revolves around a man, and they compete for his attention: Valérie and Adeline for Baron Hulot; Bette and Hortense for Wenceslas Steinbock. Balzac's study of masculinity is limited to the insatiable lust of Hulot and the weak-willed inconstancy of Steinbock, with the occasional appearance of Victorin as a sturdy patriarch in his father's absence.

Critics pay special attention to Bette's lack of traditional femininity, and her unconventional relationships with two characters. She is described from the outset as having "des qualités d'homme" ("certain manly qualities"), with similar descriptions elsewhere. Her relationship and attitude toward Steinbock, moreover, hint at her masculinity. She commands him into submission, and even binds him with economic constraints by lending him the money to develop his sculpture. Her domination is tempered by maternal compassion, but the couple's relationship is compared to an abusive marriage: "Il fut comme une femme qui pardonne les mauvais traitements d'une semaine à cause des caresses d'un fugitif raccommodement." ("He was like a woman who forgives a week of ill-usage for the sake of a kiss and a brief reconciliation.")

Bette's relationship with Valérie is layered with overtones of lesbianism. Early in the book Bette is "captée" ("bewitched") by Valérie, and quickly declares to her: "Je vous aime, je vous estime, je suis à vous!" ("I love you, I esteem you, I am wholly yours!") This affection may have been platonic, but neighbors of the Marneffes – along with many readers – suspect that their bond transcends friendship. As with Steinbock, Bette and Valérie assume butch and femme roles; the narration even mentions "Le contraste de la mâle et sèche nature de la Lorraine avec la jolie nature créole de Valérie" ("The contrast between Lisbeth's dry masculine nature and Valerie's creole prettiness"). The homoeroticism evolves through the novel, as Bette feeds on Valérie's power to seduce and control the Hulot men. As one critic says: "Valérie's body becomes, at least symbolically, the locus of Bette's only erotic pleasure."

=== Wealth and society ===
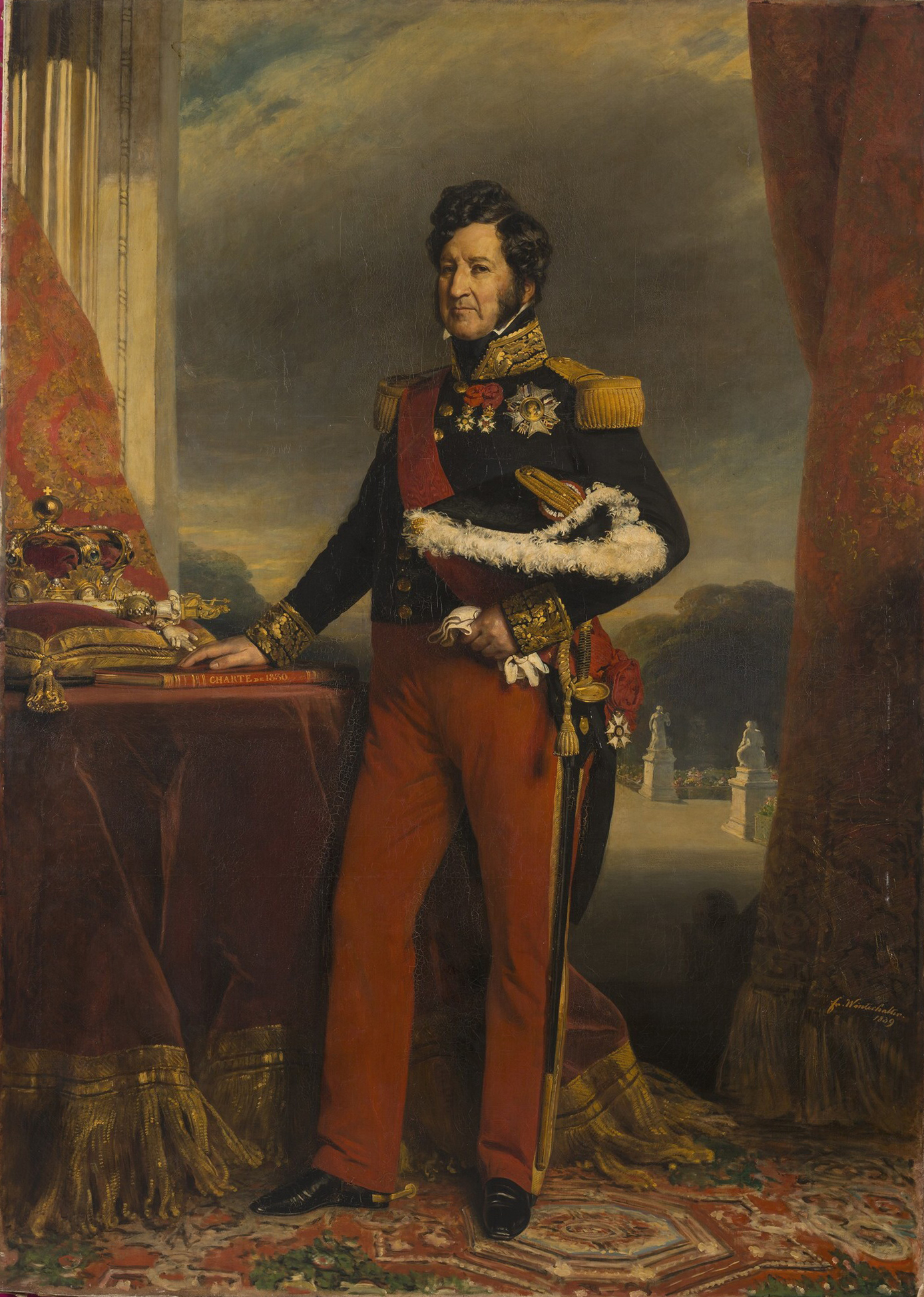
Balzac once wrote: "The worst fault of the July Revolution is that it did not allow Louis-Philippe three months of dictatorship in which to put the rights of the people and the throne on a secure basis."

As with many of his novels, Balzac analyzes the influence of history and social status in La Cousine Bette. The book takes places between 1838 and 1846, when the reign of Louis-Philippe reflected and directed significant changes in the social structure. Balzac was a legitimist favoring the House of Bourbon, and idolized Napoleon Bonaparte as a paragon of effective absolutist power. Balzac felt that French society under the House of Orléans lacked strong leadership, and was fragmented by the demands of parliament. He also believed that Catholicism provided guidance for the nation, and that its absence heralded moral decay.

Balzac demonstrated these beliefs through the characters' lives in La Cousine Bette. The conflict between Baron Hulot and the perfumer Crevel mirrors the animosity between the aristocracy of the Ancien Régime and the newly developed bourgeoisie of traders and industrial entrepreneurs. Although he despised the socialist politics of Eugène Sue, Balzac worried that bourgeois desperation for financial gain drove people from life's important virtues. The characters – especially Bette, Valérie, and Crevel – are fixated on their need for money, and do whatever they must to obtain it. As Crevel explains to Adeline: "Vous vous abusez, cher ange, si vous croyez que c'est le roi Louis-Philippe qui règne ... au-dessus de la Charte il y a la sainte, la vénérée, la solide, l'aimable, la gracieuse, la belle, la noble, la jeune, la toute-puissante pièce de cent sous!" ("You are quite mistaken, my angel, if you suppose that King Louis-Philippe rules us ... supreme above the Charter reigns the holy, venerated, substantial, delightful, obliging, beautiful, noble, ever-youthful, and all-powerful five-franc piece!")

Themes of corruption and salvation are brought to the fore as Valérie and Crevel lie dying from the mysterious poison. When his daughter urges him to meet with a priest, Crevel angrily refuses, mocking the church and indicating that his social stature will be his salvation: "la mort regarde à deux fois avant de frapper un maire de Paris!" ("Death thinks twice of it before carrying off a Mayor of Paris.") Valérie, meanwhile, makes a deathbed conversion and urges Bette to abandon her quest for revenge. Ever the courtesan, Valérie describes her new Christianity in terms of seduction: "je ne puis maintenant plaire qu'à Dieu! je vais tâcher de me réconcilier avec lui, ce sera ma dernière coquetterie!" ("I can please no one now but God. I will try to be reconciled to Him, and that will be my last flirtation ...!")

== Reception and adaptations ==
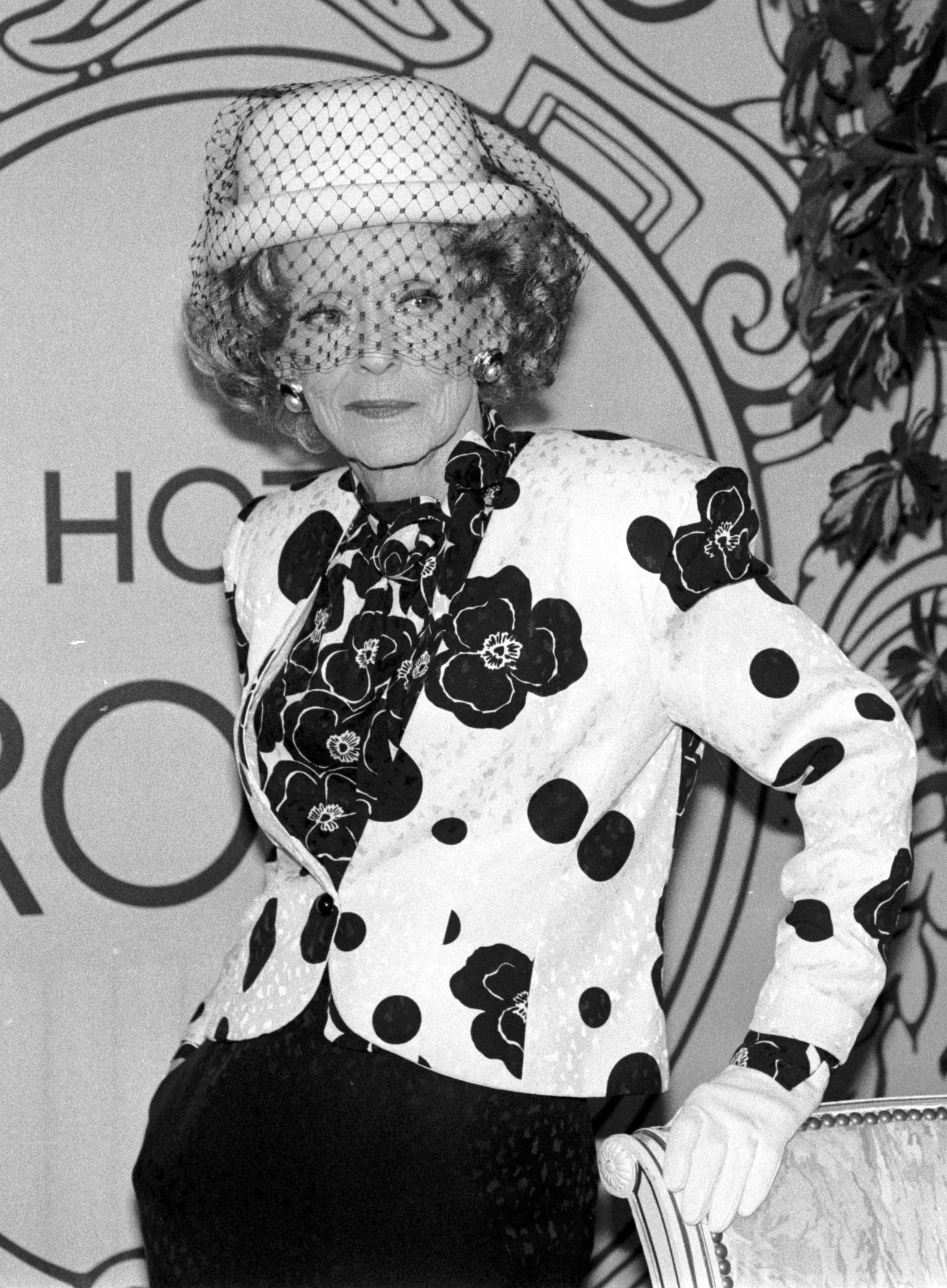
In 1921 actor Bette Davis, born Ruth Elizabeth Davis, chose Bette as her stage name in honor of Balzac's character.

The critical reaction to La Cousine Bette was immediate and positive, which Balzac did not expect. Whether due to the intensity of its creation or the tumult of his personal life, the author was surprised by the praise he received. He wrote: "I did not realize how good La Cousine Bette is ... There is an immense reaction in my favour. I have won!" The collected edition sold consistently well, and was reprinted nineteen times before the turn of the 20th century. 20th-century critics remain enthusiastic in their praise for the novel; Saintsbury insists it is "beyond all question one of the very greatest of [Balzac's] works". Biographer Graham Robb calls La Cousine Bette "the masterpiece of his premature old age".

Some 19th-century critics attacked the book, on the grounds that it normalized vice and corrupt living. Chief among these were disciples of the utopian theorist Charles Fourier; they disapproved of the "immorality" inherent in the novel's bleak resolution. Critics like Alfred Nettement and Eugène Marron declared that Balzac's sympathy lay with Baron Hulot and Valérie Marneffe. They lambasted him for not commenting more on the characters' degenerate behavior – the same stylistic choice later celebrated by naturalist writers Émile Zola and Hippolyte Taine.

Cousin Bette (1928)

Balzac's novel has been adapted several times for the screen. The first was in 1928, when French filmmaker Max DeRieux directed Alice Tissot in the title role. Margaret Tyzack played the role of Bette in the five part serial Cousin Bette made in 1971 by the BBC, which also starred Helen Mirren as Valérie Marneffe. The film Cousin Bette was released in 1998, directed by Des McAnuff. Jessica Lange starred in the title role, joined by Bob Hoskins as Crevel, and Elisabeth Shue as the singer Jenny Cadine. Screenwriters Lynn Siefert and Susan Tarr changed the story significantly, and eliminated Valérie. The 1998 film was panned by critics for its generally poor acting and awkward dialogue. Stephen Holden of The New York Times commented that the movie "treats the novel as a thoroughly modern social comedy peopled with raging narcissists, opportunists and flat-out fools". The 1998 film changed the novel quite drastically, retaining the basic idea of Bette avenging herself on her enemies, and not only eliminating Valerie, but letting Bette survive at the end.

La Cousine Bette was adapted for the stage by Jeffrey Hatcher, best known for his screenplay Stage Beauty (based on his stage play Compleat Female Stage Beauty). The Antaeus Company in North Hollywood produced a workshop in 2008 and presented the world premiere of Cousin Bette in early 2010 in North Hollywood, California. The adaptation retains many of the main characters but places Bette as the story's narrator.

== English translations ==
- Cousin Bette, trans. Katharine Prescott Wormeley (Roberts, 1888)
- Cousin Bette, trans. George B. Ives and William Walton (Henry T. Thomas & Company, 1896)
- Cousin Betty, trans. Clara Bell and James Waring (Dent, 1896)
- Cousin Bette, trans. Marion Ayton Crawford (Penguin, 1965)
- Cousin Bette, trans. Kathleen Raine (Modern Library, 1948)
- Cousin Bette, trans. Sylvia Raphael (Oxford University Press, 1992)
