= La Bourse =

Short story by Honoré de Balzac

The Purse
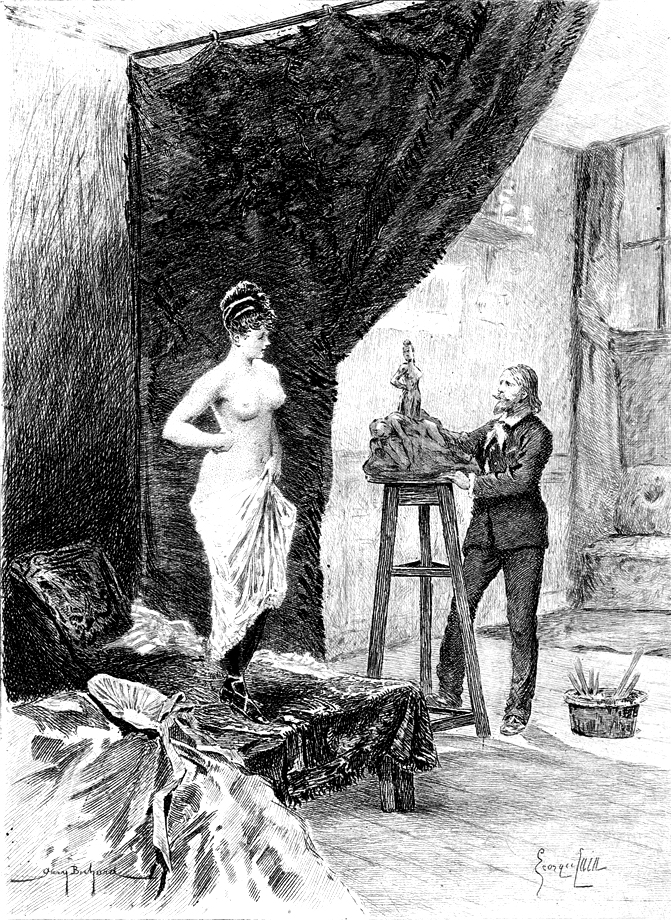
- Illustration from an 1897 edition by Georges Cain
- Author: Honoré de Balzac
- Original title: La Bourse
- Translator: Clara Bell
- Language: French
- Series: La Comédie humaine
- Genre: Scènes de la vie privée
- Publisher: Mame-Delaunay
- Publication date: 1832
- Publication place: France
- Preceded by: Mémoires de deux jeunes mariées
- Followed by: Modeste Mignon

La Bourse (The Purse) is a short story by the French novelist Honoré de Balzac. It was published in 1832 by Mame-Delaunay as one of the Scènes de la vie privée (Scenes of Private Life) in La Comédie humaine. Later editions of the work were brought out by Béchet in 1835 and by Charpentier in 1839, in both of which La Bourse was placed among the Scènes de la vie parisienne (Scenes of Parisian Life). It was, however, restored to the Scènes de la vie privée when Furne brought out the fourth and final edition in 1842; this heavily revised version of the story appeared as the third work in Volume 1 of La Comédie humaine.

== Plot ==
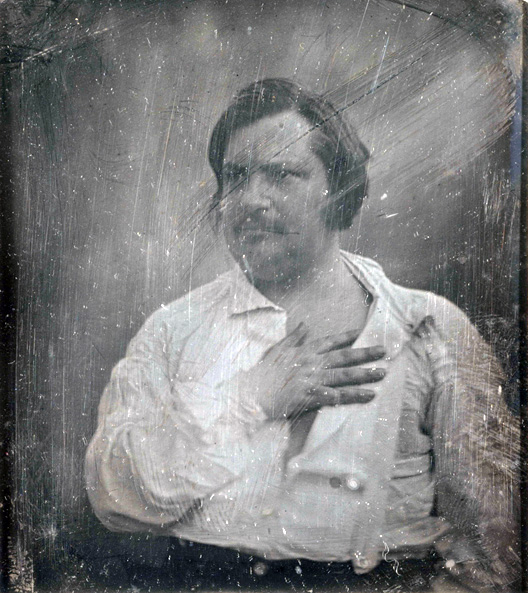
Honoré de Balzac

The young painter Hippolyte Schinner falls from a step-ladder while working in his atelier and is knocked unconscious. The noise of his fall alerts two of his neighbours, Adélaïde Leseigneur and her mother Madame de Rouville, who occupy the apartment immediately below. The two women revive the young man and an acquaintance is struck up. Inevitably, the young painter falls in love with Adélaïde and over the following weeks he pays frequent visits to her apartment. There he is always warmly welcomed, but he cannot help noticing the unmistakable signs of poverty – a poverty that the two women are at obvious pains to hide. Hippolyte's suspicions are aroused. The mother and her daughter have different surnames; they are reluctant to reveal anything of their past; and what is Hippolyte to make of the two old friends of the mother, the Comte de Kergarouet and the Chevalier du Halga, who regularly visit her to play cards for money, but who always lose to her as though on purpose?

Hippolyte discovers that Madame de Rouville's late husband was a naval captain who died at Batavia from wounds received in an engagement with an English vessel. The Comte de Kergarouet, it transpires, is a former comrade of Baron de Rouville. Hippolyte offers to draw a portrait of Monsieur de Rouville, a fading sketch of whom is hanging in the apartment. Two months later, when the finished portrait is hung in Madame de Rouville's apartment, the Comte de Kergarouet offers Hippolyte 500 pistoles to have his own portrait painted in a similar style. Hippolyte, however, suspects that the old man is offering him the price of both portraits while paying for his own, and he declines the offer.

Despite his suspicions that the two women make are living in some mysterious and disreputable manner, Hippolyte continues his visits, for he is deeply in love with Adélaïde. One day, as he is leaving the apartment, he realizes that he has left his purse behind; but when he returns and inquires about it, Adélaïde brazenly insists that no such purse has been left in their apartment. The young man suspects he has been robbed by the women and he stops visiting them. Over the following week he pines away. His colleagues seem to confirm his worst suspicions – that Adélaïde is a prostitute and Madame de Rouville her procuress. Even his mother notices that he is out of sorts.

But a chance meeting on the stairs outside Adélaïde's apartment is enough to dispel all Hippolyte's suspicions. He decides that he was wrong to ignore the promptings of his heart. That evening he calls on the two women. Madame de Rouville suggests a game of cards. Hippolyte loses, and when he reaches into his pocket for some money, he finds before him a purse which Adélaïde has slipped in front of him without his noticing it: "the poor child had the old one in her hand, and, to keep her countenance, was looking into it for the money to pay her mother. The blood rushed to Hippolyte's heart with such force that he was near fainting. The new purse, substituted for his own, and which contained his fifteen Louis d'or, was worked with gilt beads. The rings and tassels bore witness to Adélaïde's good taste, and she had no doubt spent all her little hoard in ornamenting this pretty piece of work. It was impossible to say with greater delicacy that the painter's gift could only be repaid by some proof of affection." There and then Hipployte asks for Adélaïde's hand in marriage.

Meanwhile, Hippolyte's mother, having made inquiries about her son's condition and having learned of the whole affair, informs the Comte de Kergarouet of the malicious rumours surrounding the two women. Outraged, he explains to Madame Schinner that he loses intentionally at cards to Madame de Rouville because the Baronne's pride has left him none but these ingenious means of assisting her and her daughter in their poverty.

The Comte de Kergarouet and Madame Schinner go round to Madame de Rouville's, and arrive just in time to pronounce a benediction on the young lovers' engagement.

== Balzac and art ==
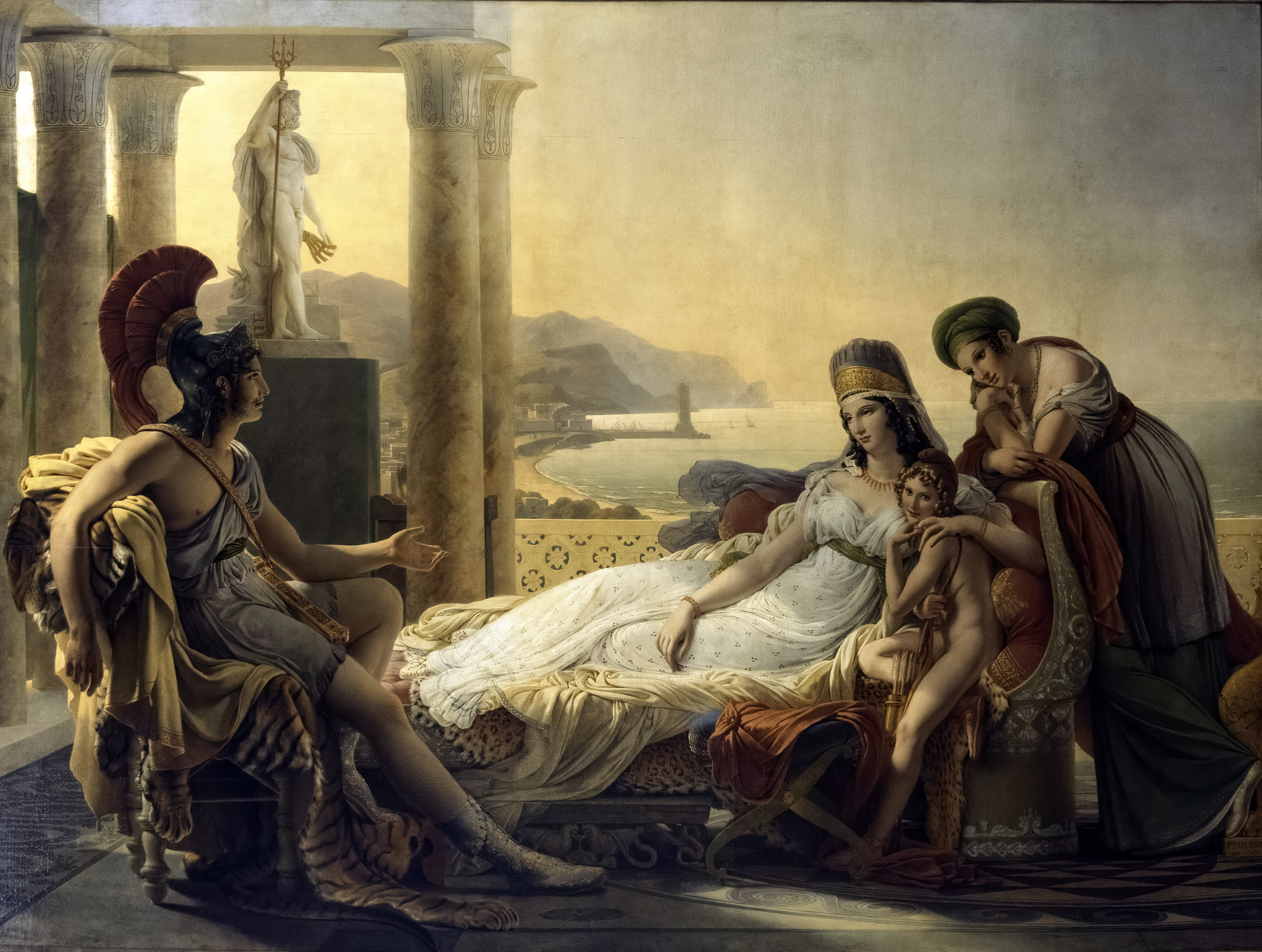
Aeneas describes to Dido the fall of Troy, by Pierre-Narcisse Guérin (1815)

In La Bourse, Balzac deals with a range of themes which he was to explore in great detail throughout La Comédie humaine: the arts; creation in all its forms, as well as the joys and the pains which it causes. A great admirer of Eugène Delacroix, whom he was later to use as a model for the character of Joseph Bridau (a painter who appears in The Black Sheep, A Start in Life and La Bourse), he depicts the act of artistic creation from every angle: the innovative and misunderstood painter (the brilliant Frenhofer in The Unknown Masterpiece); the novice painter who gains public recognition (Joseph Bridau); the wealthy and successful but mediocre painter (Pierre Grassou, who makes copies of the masters).

Balzac rarely misses an opportunity to illustrate his novels with references to famous paintings, and La Bourse is no different: " Adelaide came behind the old gentleman's armchair and leaned her elbows on the back, unconsciously imitating the attitude given to Dido's sister by Guérin in his famous picture."

Balzac also deals brilliantly with those disciplines of the arts which are dear to him and which distinguish La Comédie humaine, treating them with a meticulousness and a precision which still astonish experts today:

- Sculpture: Sarrasine whose eponymous hero is a rebel genius.
- Music: Gambara, in which is described a quasi-mathematical creation of a musical work of art, and in which Balzac also gives us a meticulous analysis of one of Giacomo Meyerbeer's operas.
- Lyrical art: Massimilla Doni, in which a love story serves as a pretext for a lecture on the art of Rossini.

Balzac is a great storyteller and creator of fables. La Bourse is a subtle fable in which an artist – one who, by definition, is skilled in the art of observation – must try and make sense of the conflicting signs he observes in Madame de Rouville's apartment, as though he is trying to decipher a work of art. Balzac also portrays in this short story a social category to which he often returns in La Comédie humaine: the forgotten victims of Napoleon. Although regarded as a minor work, La Bourse illustrates the world of painting in a rather unexpected way. It also sheds light on other works on the same theme, and on Balzac's understanding of art. As such, it represents an important stone in the edifice of La Comédie humaine.

== See also ==
- Repertory of the Comedie Humaine
