= Gambara (short story) =

Short story by Honoré de Balzac

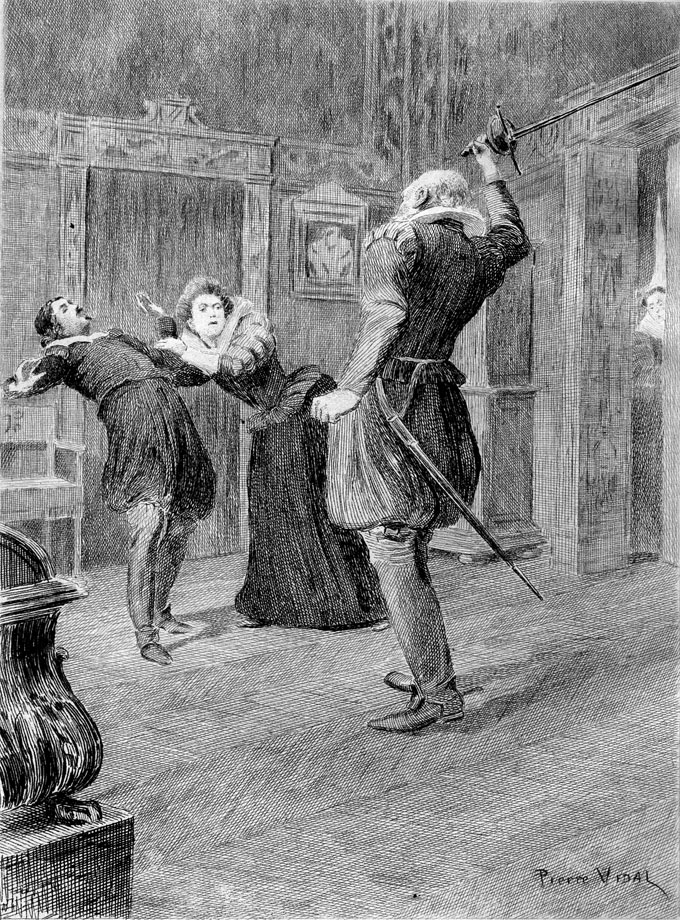
- Image from Gambara
- Author: Honoré de Balzac
- Illustrator: Pierre Vidal
- Language: French
- Series: La Comédie humaine
- Publisher: Hippolyte Souverain
- Publication date: 1837
- Publication place: France
- Preceded by: Massimilla Doni
- Followed by: Les Proscrits

Gambara is a short story by Honoré de Balzac, first published in 1837 in the Revue et gazette musicale de Paris at the request of its editor Maurice Schlesinger. It is one of the Études philosophiques of La Comédie humaine.

== History ==
Schlesinger commissioned the novella to promote Giacomo Meyerbeer's opera, Les Huguenots, which he was also publishing. At the time of its publication, Balzac was going every week to the Théâtre des Italiens, watching the shows from the box of the Guidoboni-Visconti, Italian friends of his who had first met him in the Scala in Milan and at the shows in Venice. The text was edited into a single volume with le Cabinet des Antiques, published by éditions Souverain in 1839, before being published by édition Furne in 1846 in the Études philosophiques, following Massimilla Doni, a short story also written by Balzac shortly after returning from Italy, highly impressed by what he called the "mother of the arts".

This work shows the formidable artistic intuition Balzac had already developed in le Chef-d'œuvre inconnu, la Bourse, his habit of taking on the guise of a painter and of searching the soul and meandering thoughts of a sculptor in Sarrasine. With Gambara, Balzac addressed the musical world with the character of an instrument-maker who becomes a composer of mad music, as a substitute for himself as an author composing a work - he has Gambara say:

Music is at once a science and an art. The roots it has in physics and mathematics makes it a science; it becomes an art by the inspiration that it uses whilst insulated from science's theorems. It owes physics the essence of the substance it employs, the sound of modified air; the air is composed of principals, which certainly find in us the main analogues which respond to them, sympathise with them, and magnify them by the power of thought. Air also has to contain particles of different elasticities and able to vibrate at as many different durations as there are tones of sound bodies, and these particles piece our ear ear, put to work by the musician, replying to ideas following our organisation.

Misunderstood on its first publication, this short story has since been re-evaluated. Musicologists have demonstrated few errors in Balzac's research, which he passionately documented. He impressed George Sand with his ideas about opera during a conversation on music, and she advised him to write down what they had been discussing.

== Plot summary ==
The Milanese nobleman count Andrea Marcosini strolls to the Palais-Royal in Paris, where he spots in the crowd the extraordinary face of a woman with fiery eyes. She tries to escape him, but he chases her as far as a sordid alley behind the Palais-Royal where she disappears. If he is "attached to the step of a woman whose costume announced a deep, radical, ancient, inveterate misery, who was no fairer than so many others he saw each night at the Opéra", it was his eye that was literally spellbound. As soon as he inquires after her he discovers that her name is Marianna and she is married to a composer, performer, instrument-maker and expert on music theory called Gambara – though his music is only beautiful when he is drunk. Marianna sacrifices herself for him, working in humble jobs to pay for their household's upkeep, for she strongly believes in her husband's misunderstood genius. After having tried to save the couple from their miserable existence, to support Gambara from his own means by giving him money (or even worse, by giving him drink), the count finally takes the beautiful Marianna from her husband but then abandons her for a dancer. Marianna then goes back to her husband, more miserable than ever.

== Bibliography ==
- Text of Gambara on French Wikisource
- (in French) Max Andréoli, « Sublime et parodie dans les Contes artistes de Balzac », L'Année balzacienne, 1994, n° 15, p. 7-38.
- (in French) Pierre Brunel, « Gambara, ou l’opéra ivre », Corps écrit, 1985, n° 13, pp. 133–139.
- Jean-Pierre Barricelli, « Poésie and Suono: Balzac and Leopardi on Music », Romanticism across the Disciplines, Larry H. Peer, Éd. et intro., Lanham, UP of America, 1998, p. 99-113.
- (in French) Matthias Brzoska, « Mahomet et Robert-le-Diable : l’Esthétique musicale dans Gambara », L’Année balzacienne, 1984, n° 4, pp. 51–78.
- (in French) Pierre Citron, « Gambara, Strunz et Beethoven » L’Année balzacienne, Paris, Eds. Garnier Frères, 1967, p. 165-170.
- (in French) Pierre Citron, « Préludes à Gambara », L’Année balzacienne, 1982, n° 3, pp. 292–294.
- Conway, David (2012). Jewry in Music – Entry to the Profession from the Enlightenment to Richard Wagner. Cambridge: Cambridge University Press. ISBN 978-1-107-01538-8.
- (in French) Geneviève Delattre, « Andrea Marcosini et les tribulations du romancier dans Gambara », L’Année balzacienne, 1984, n° 4, p. 79-91.
- (in French) Béatrice Didier, « Logique du récit musical chez Stendhal et chez Balzac », Stendhal, Balzac, Dumas : un récit romantique ? Chantal Massol, Éd., Lise Dumasy, Intro., Toulouse, PU du Mirail, 2006, p. 137-47.
- Louise Fiber Luce, « Alchemy and the Artist in Balzac’s Gambara », Centerpoint, 1978, n° 3 (1), p. 67-74.
- (in French) J.-C. Fizaine, « Génie et folie dans Louis Lambert, Gambara et Massimilla Doni », Revue des sciences humaines, 1979, n° 175, p. 61-75.
- Bettina L. Knapp, « Balzac’s Gambara: Music Is a Science and an Art », Nineteenth-Century French Studies, Fall-Winter 1986-1987, n° 15 (1-2), p. 62-69.
- (in German) Klaus Ley, « Die Oper im Roman: Erzählkunst und Musik bei Stendhal, Balzac und Flaubert », Heidelberg, Carl Winter Universitätsverlag, 1995.
- Roger Pierrot, « La Véritable Édition originale de Gambara », Mélanges d’histoire du livre et des bibliothèques offerts à Frantz Calot, 1961, p. 175-179.
- Anthony R. Pugh, « Balzac’s Beethoven: A Note on Gambara », Romance Notes, 1966, n° 8: 43-46.
- (in French) Daniela Teodorescu, « Deux Personnages dans Gambara de Balzac : les Effets et les causes », Symposium, Spring 2004, n° 58 (1), p. 29-42.
