= Massimilla Doni =

Short story by Honoré de Balzac

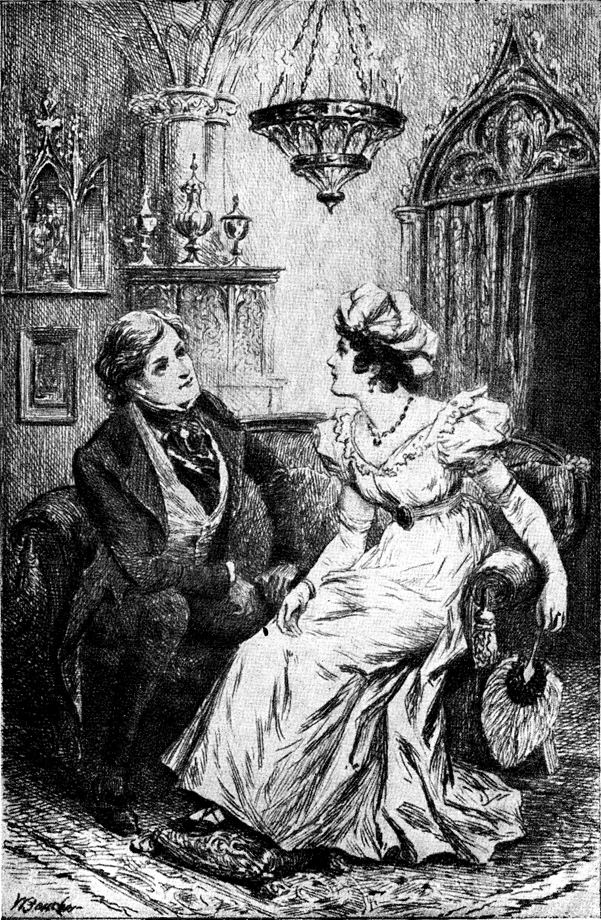
- Image from Massimilla Doni
- Author: Honoré de Balzac
- Illustrator: W. Boucher
- Language: French
- Series: La Comédie humaine
- Publisher: Hippolyte Souverain
- Publication date: 1837
- Publication place: France
- Preceded by: La Recherche de l'absolu
- Followed by: Gambara

Massimilla Doni is a short story by Honoré de Balzac.

== History ==
Its first chapter was published in 1837 in the Études philosophiques of la Comédie humaine alongside Gambara, les Proscrits and Séraphîta. Its second chapter was published in 1839 in the review la France musicale, under the title Une représentation du 'Mosè in Egitto' by Rossini in Venice, with a preamble underlining the role Stendhal had played in making Rossini known in France.

George Sand, with whom Balzac had shared his enthusiasm for Mosè in Egitto, advised the writer to put his story on paper. Balzac also wrote to Maurice Schlesinger, who had commissioned a novel from him for the Revue et gazette musicale de Paris, to ask him for a little extra time to pursue two ideas - one on Robert le Diable by Giacomo Meyerbeer, and the other on Mosè in Egitto and The Barber of Seville by Rossini. The first of these ideas gave rise to Gambara and the second to Massimilla Doni.

Massimilla Doni is a true love song to Rossini's music, to the city of Venice, to the Italian art of living, to Italian aristocrats' elegant simplicity in going to the opera not to see and be seen but to listen and be moved by music. In each box of the la Fenice opera house, the great ladies receive people without ceremony, express their sentiments spontaneously and shed tears of emotion, with male music-lovers going to the caffè Florian after the show to recount every moment of spectacle, each musical phrase, each note, staying all night if necessary. A Frenchman happens to find himself in the box of Massimilla Doni, duchess of Caetano, and is received by her without pretension and with all friendliness, receiving a true education in lyric opera.

The work is short but highly important for la Comédie humaine and it took Balzac two years to perfect it.

== Adaptations ==
The Swiss composer Othmar Schoeck turned Massimilla Doni into a 4-act (6-scene) opera, first produced on 2 March 1937 at the Semperoper in Dresden.

== Plot ==
Emilio Memmi, recently made prince of Varese and heir to a palace, is desperately in love with Massimila Doni, wife of the duke of Caetano, a debauched old man who is keeping the singer Clara Tinti as a mistress. Massimilla returns his love, but it remains platonic, chaste and delicate on both sides. A terrible misunderstanding leads Emilio to meet Tinti in his palace and falls in love with her pleasurable charms, ashamed of himself. However, Massimilla has met a French doctor who she has initiated into the mysteries of music and who in return helps Emilio to accept the idea that carnal love and pure love blend beautifully.

However, this love story mainly serves as a thread through a text exclusively concentrated on music and lyric opera, the description of the world of music-lovers, the atmosphere of Venice and a portrait of its main character Massimilla.

== Bibliography ==
- Massimilla Doni on French Wikisource
- (in French) Max Andréoli, « Sublime et parodie dans les Contes artistes de Balzac », l'Année balzacienne, 1994, numero 15, p. 7-38.
- (in French) Pierre Brunel, « Mosè dans Massimilla Doni », l’Année balzacienne, 1994, numero 15, p. 39-54.
- (in French) Mariane Bury, « Les Français en Italie dans Massimilla Doni », l’Année balzacienne, 1992, numero 13, p. 207-20.
- (in French) Béatrice Didier, « Logique du récit musical chez Stendhal et chez Balzac », Stendhal, Balzac, Dumas : un récit romantique ? Chantal Massol, Éd., Lise Dumasy, Intro., Toulouse, PU du Mirail, 2006, p. 137-47.
- (in French) Jean-Claude Fizaine, « Génie et folie dans Louis Lambert, Gambara et Massimilla Doni », Revue des sciences humaines, 1979, numero 175, p. 61-75.
- (in French) Brigitte Leroy-Viémon, « Splendeurs et misères du processus de création de soi à partir de la nouvelle de Balzac Massimilla Doni », Innovation Creation, Jean-Pierre Martineau, Éd. et intro., Toulouse, PU du Mirail, 1995, p. 37-54.
- (in French) Moïse Le Yaouanc, « À propos de ‘la’ Cataneo et de ‘la’ Sanseverina », l’Année balzacienne, 1985, numero 5, p. 366-75.
- (in French) Max Milner, « Les Sens ‘psychiques’ de Massimilla Doni et la conception balzacienne de l’âme », l’Année balzacienne, Paris, Garnier Frères, 1966, p. 157-69.
- (in French) Hélène Spengler, « Système et mises en scène de l’énergie dans le récit romantique selon Stendhal et Balzac : Massimilla Doni et ses intertextes stendhaliens », Stendhal, Balzac, Dumas : un récit romantique ? Chantal Massol, Éd., Lise Dumasy, Intro., Toulouse, PU du Mirail, 2006, p. 69-99.
