= Louis Lambert (novel) =

1832 novel by Honoré de Balzac

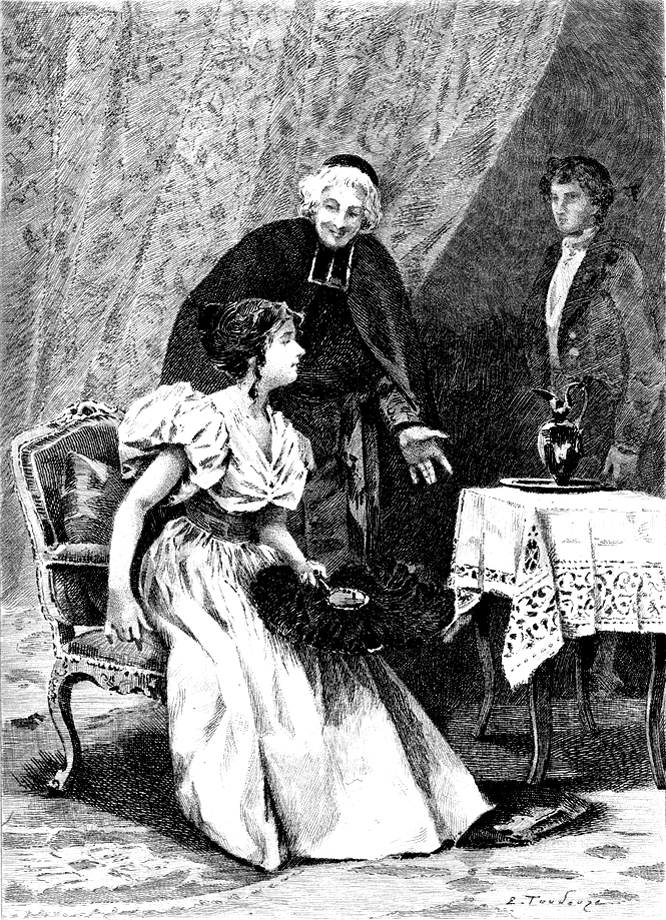
- Image from Louis Lambert
- Author: Honoré de Balzac
- Illustrator: Édouard Toudouze
- Language: French
- Series: La Comédie humaine
- Published: 1831 (Charles Gosselin)
- Publication place: France
- Preceded by: Les Proscrits
- Followed by: Séraphîta

Louis Lambert is an 1832 novel by French novelist and playwright Honoré de Balzac (1799–1850), included in the Études philosophiques section of his novel sequence La Comédie humaine. Set mostly in a school at Vendôme, it examines the life and theories of a boy genius fascinated by the Swedish philosopher Emanuel Swedenborg (1688–1772).

Balzac wrote Louis Lambert during the summer of 1832 while he was staying with friends at the Château de Saché, and published three editions with three different titles. The novel contains a minimal plot, focusing mostly on the metaphysical ideas of its boy-genius protagonist and his only friend (eventually revealed to be Balzac himself). Although it is not a significant example of the realist style for which Balzac became famous, the novel provides insight into the author's own childhood. Specific details and events from the author's life – including punishment from teachers and social ostracism – suggest a fictionalized autobiography.

While he was a student at Vendôme, Balzac wrote an essay called Traité de la Volonté ("Treatise on the Will"); it is described in the novel as being written by Louis Lambert. The essay discusses the philosophy of Swedenborg and others, although Balzac did not explore many of the metaphysical concepts until much later in his life. Ideas analyzed in the essay and elsewhere in the novel include the split between inward and outward existence; the presence of angels and spiritual enlightenment; and the interplay between genius and madness.

Although critics panned the novel, Balzac remained steadfast in his belief that it provided an important look at philosophy, especially metaphysics. As he developed the scheme for La Comédie humaine, he placed Louis Lambert in the Études philosophiques section, and later returned to the same themes in his novel Séraphîta, about an androgynous angelic creature.

== Background ==
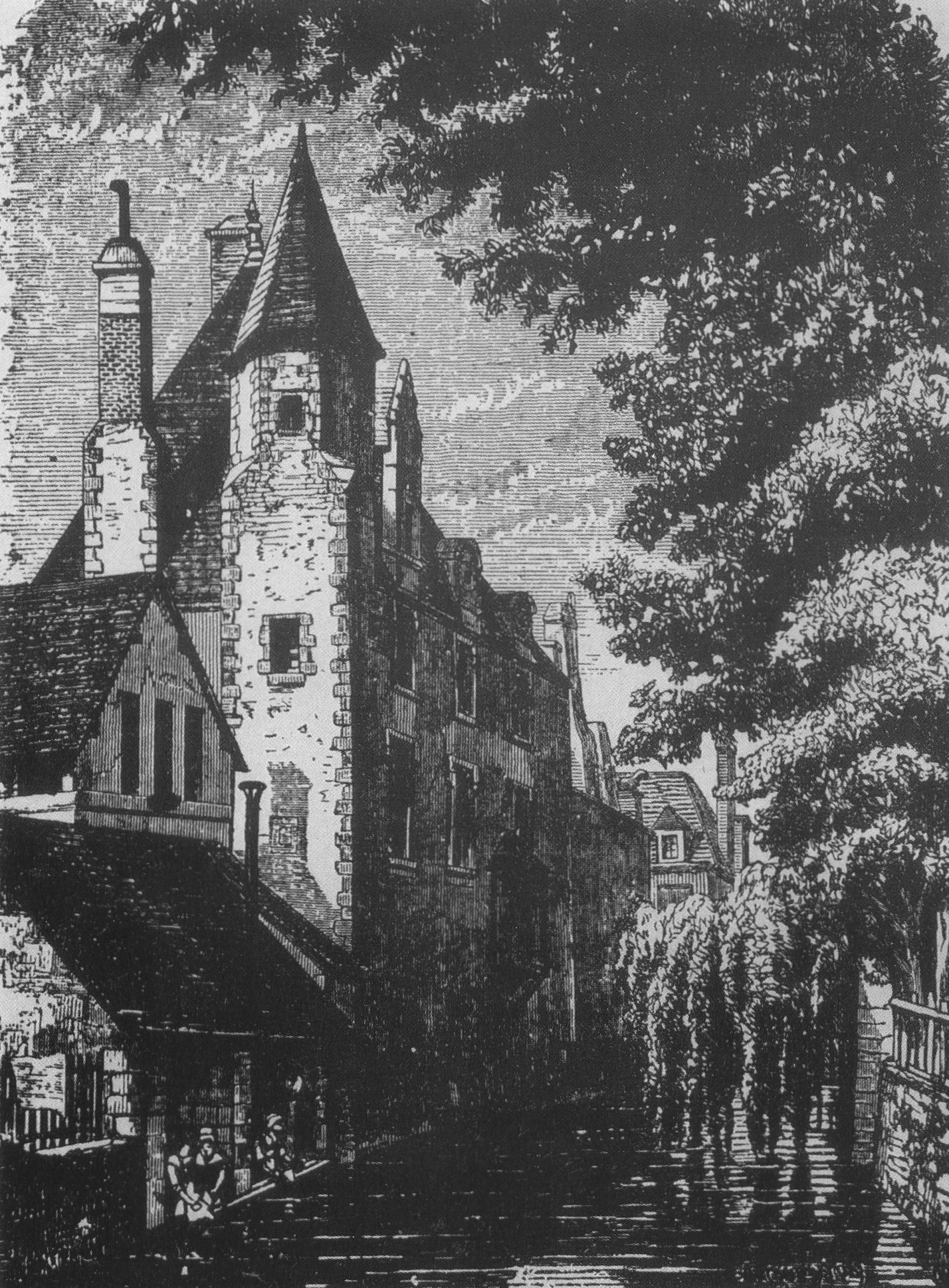
Like his creator Honoré de Balzac, Louis Lambert spends his adolescent years at the College de Vendôme, reading many books and suffering punishment from teachers.

By 1832, Honoré de Balzac had begun to make a name for himself as a writer. The second of five children, Balzac was sent to the Oratorian College de Vendôme at the age of eight. He returned from the school six years later, sickly and weak. He was taught by tutors and private schools for two and a half years, then attended the Sorbonne in Paris. After training as a law clerk for three years, he moved into a tiny garret in 1819 and began writing.

His first efforts, published under a variety of pseudonyms, were cheaply printed potboiler novels. In 1829 he finally released a novel under his own name, titled Les Chouans; it was a minor success, though it did not earn the author enough money to relieve his considerable debt. He found fame soon afterwards with a series of novels including La Physiologie du mariage (1829), Sarrasine (1830), and La Peau de chagrin (1831).

In 1831 Balzac published a short story called "Les Proscrits" ("The Exiles"), about two poets named Dante and Godefroid de Gand who attend the Sorbonne at the start of the fourteenth century. It explores questions of metaphysics and mysticism, particularly the spiritual quest for illuminism and enlightenment. Balzac had been influenced greatly as a young man by the Swedish philosopher Emanuel Swedenborg, whose theories permeate "Les Proscrits". The story was published – alongside La Peau de chagrin, which also delves into metaphysics – as part of an 1831 collection entitled Romans et contes philosophiques ("Philosophical novels and stories").

== Writing and publication ==
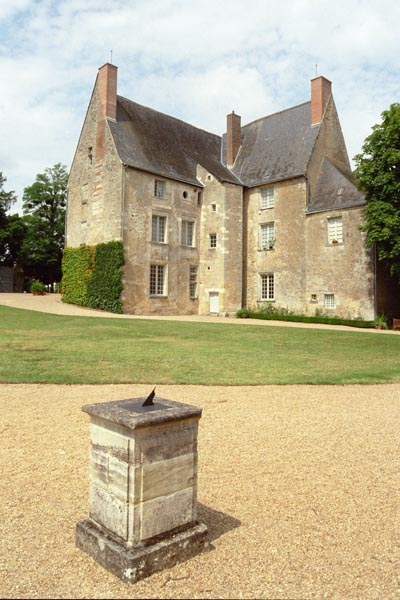
Balzac wrote Louis Lambert while staying at the Château de Saché, near Tours.

In May 1832, Balzac suffered a head injury when his tilbury carriage crashed in a Parisian street. Although he was not hurt badly, he wrote to a friend about his worry that "some of the cogs in the mechanism of my brain may have got out of adjustment". His doctor ordered him to rest and refrain from writing and other mental activity. When he had recuperated, he spent the summer at the Château de Saché, just outside the city of Tours, with a family friend, Jean de Margonne.

While in Saché, he wrote a short novel called Notice biographique sur Louis Lambert about a misfit boy genius interested in metaphysics. Like "Les Proscrits", Louis Lambert was a vehicle for Balzac to explore the ideas that had fascinated him, particularly those of Swedenborg and Louis Claude de Saint-Martin. He hoped the work would "produce an effect of incontestable superiority". and provide "a glorious rebuttal" to critics who ridiculed his interest in metaphysics.

The novel was first published as part of the Nouveaux contes philosophiques in late 1832, but by the start of the following year he declared it to be "a wretched miscarriage" and began rewriting it. During the process, Balzac was aided by a grammarian working as a proofreader, who found "a thousand errors" in the text. Once he had returned home, the author "cried with despair and with that rage that takes hold of you when you recognize your faults after working so hard".

A vastly expanded and revised novel, Histoire intellectuelle de L.L., was published as a single volume in 1833. Balzac, still unsatisfied, continued reworking the text – as he often did between editions – and included a series of letters written by the boy genius, as well as a detailed description of his metaphysical theories. This final edition was released as Louis Lambert, included with "Les Proscrits" and a later work, Séraphîta, in a volume entitled Le Livre mystique ("The Mystical Book").

== Plot summary ==
The novel begins with an overview of the main character's background. Louis Lambert, the only child of a tanner and his wife, is born in 1797 and begins reading at an early age. In 1811 he meets the real-life Swiss author Madame de Staël (1766–1817), who – struck by his intellect – pays for him to enroll in the Collège de Vendôme. There he meets the narrator, a classmate named "the Poet" who later identifies himself in the text as Balzac; they quickly become friends. Shunned by the other students and berated by teachers for not paying attention, the boys bond through discussions of philosophy and mysticism.

After completing an essay entitled Traité de la Volonté ("Treatise on the Will"), Lambert is horrified when a teacher confiscates it, calls it "rubbish", and – the narrator speculates – sells it to a local grocer. Soon afterwards, a serious illness forces the narrator to leave the school. In 1815, Lambert graduates at the age of eighteen and lives for three years in Paris. After returning to his uncle's home in Blois, he meets a woman named Pauline de Villenoix and falls passionately in love with her. On the day before their wedding, however, he suffers a mental breakdown and attempts to castrate himself.

Declared "incurable" by doctors, Lambert is ordered into solitude and rest. Pauline takes him to her family's château, where he lives in a near coma. The narrator, ignorant of these events, meets Lambert's uncle by chance, and is given a series of letters. Written by Lambert while in Paris and Blois, they continue his philosophical musings and describe his love for Pauline. The narrator visits his old friend at the Villenoix château, where the decrepit Lambert says only: "The angels are white." Pauline shares a series of statements her lover had dictated, and Lambert dies on 25 September 1824 at the age of twenty-eight.

== Style ==
The actual events of Louis Lambert are secondary to extended discussions of philosophy (especially metaphysics) and human emotion. Because the novel does not employ the same sort of realism for which Balzac became famous, it has been called one of "the most diffuse and least valuable of his works". Whereas many Balzac stories focus on the external world, Louis Lambert examines many aspects of the thought process and the life of the mind. Many critics, however, condemn the author's disorganized style and his placement of his own mature philosophies into the mind of a teenage boy.

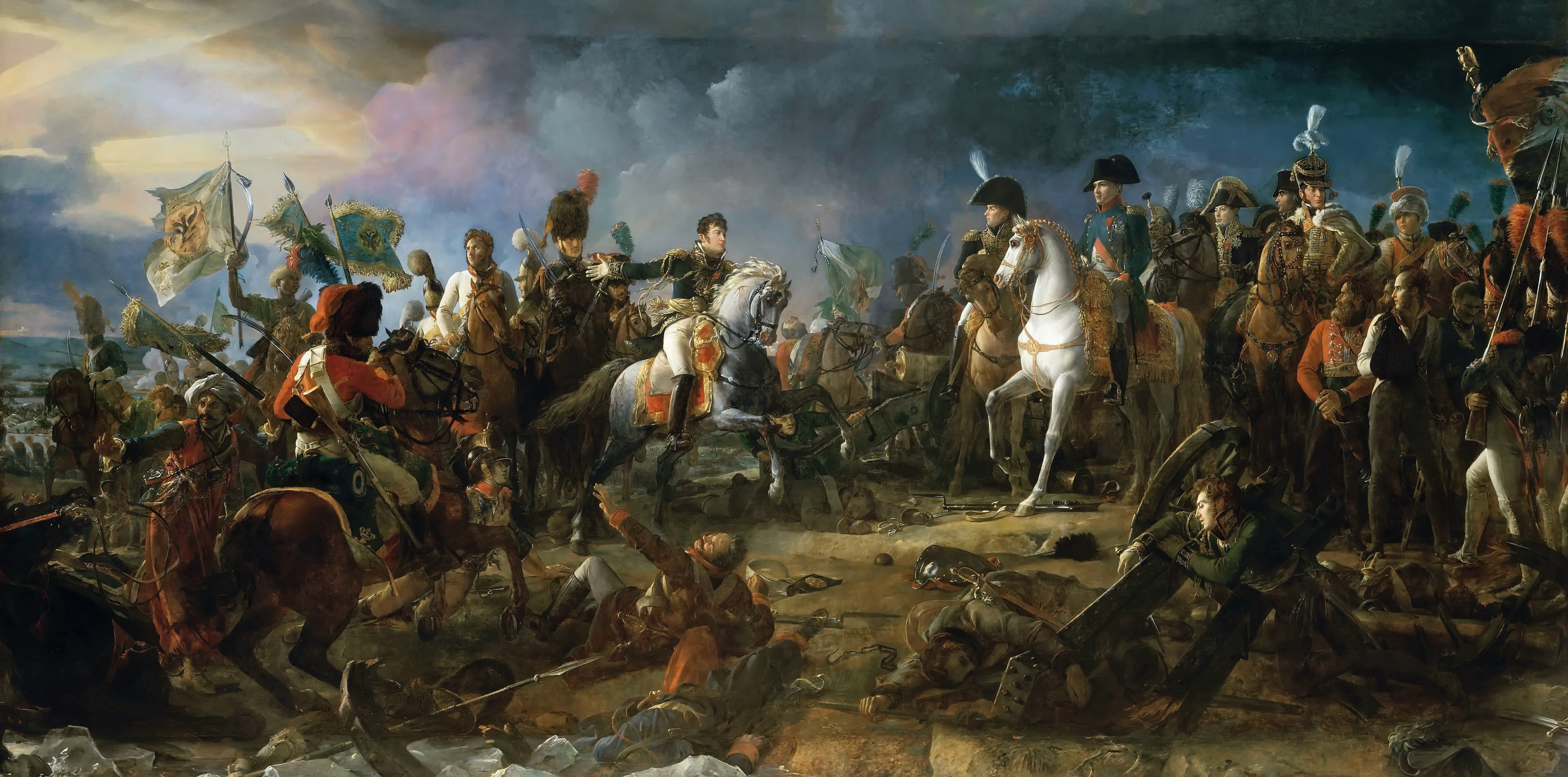
Louis Lambert's ability to feel himself present at the Battle of Austerlitz (depicted here in a painting by François Gérard) reflects Balzac's own use of realism.

Still, shades of Balzac's realism are found in the book, particularly in the first-hand descriptions of the Collège de Vendôme. The first part of the novel is replete with details about the school, describing how quarters were inspected and the complex social rules for exchanging dishes at dinnertime. Punishments are also described at length, including the assignment of tedious writing tasks and the painful application of the strap:

Of all the physical torments to which we were exposed, certainly the most acute was that inflicted by this leathern instrument, about two fingers wide, applied to our poor little hands with all the strength and all the fury of the administrator. To endure this classical form of correction, the victim knelt in the middle of the room. He had to leave his form and go to kneel down near the master's desk under the curious and generally merciless eyes of his fellows.... Some boys cried out and shed bitter tears before or after the application of the strap; others accepted the infliction with stoic calm ... but few could control an expression of anguish in anticipation.

Further signs of Balzac's realism appear when Lambert describes his ability to vicariously experience events through thought alone. In one extended passage, he describes reading about the Battle of Austerlitz and seeing "every incident". In another he imagines the physical pain of a knife cutting his skin. As Balzac's biographer André Maurois notes, these reflections provide insight into the author's perspective toward the world and its written representations.

== Themes ==
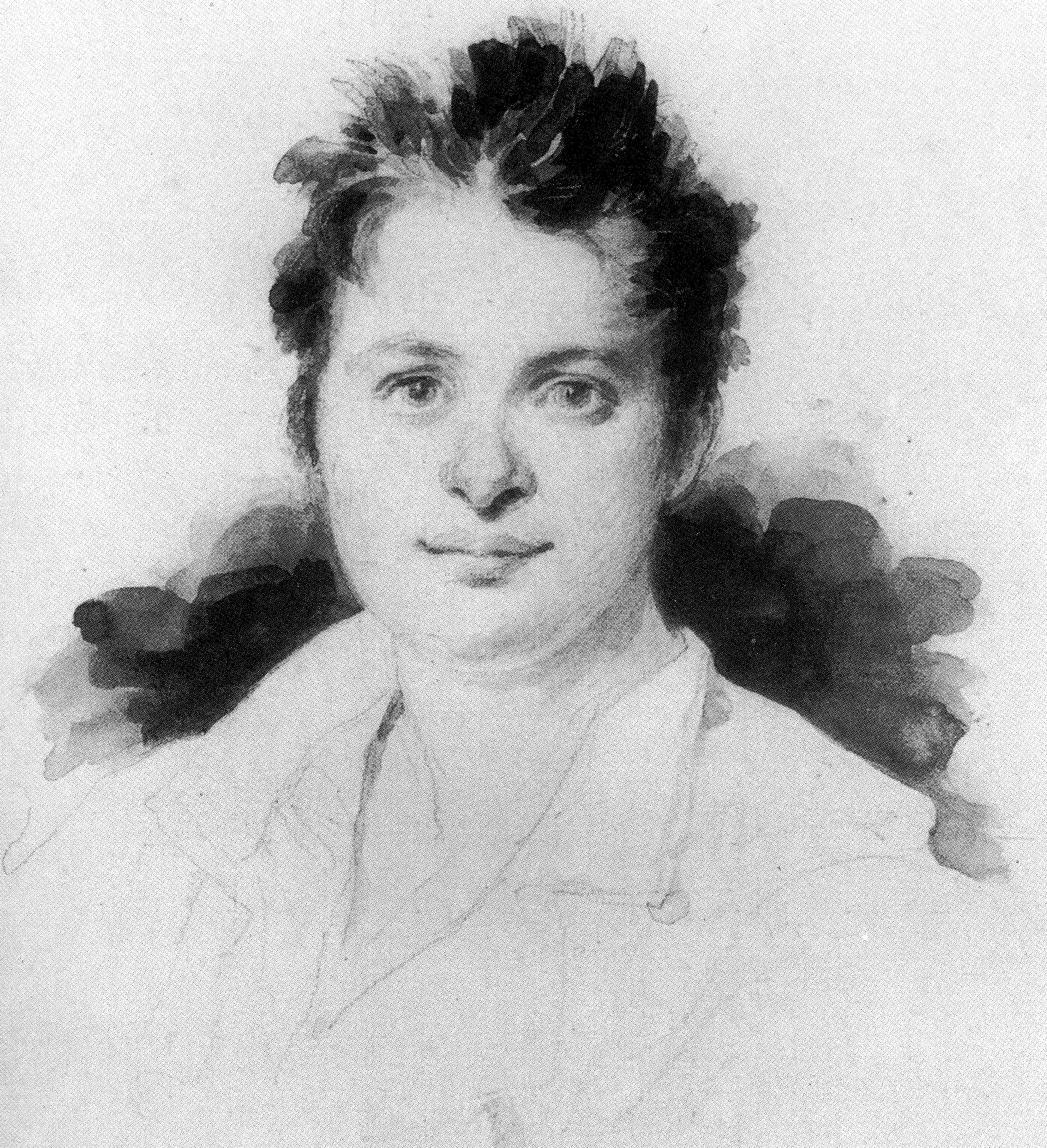
Balzac, seen here in his mid-20s, describes Louis Lambert as "slightly built, nearly five feet in height", with "hair, of a fine, bright black in masses of curls".

=== Autobiography ===
Biographers and critics agree that Louis Lambert is a thinly veiled version of the author, evidenced by numerous similarities between them. As a student at the Collège de Vendôme, Balzac was friends with a boy named Louis-Lambert Tinant. Like the title character, Balzac's faith was shaken at the time of his first communion. Balzac read voraciously while in school, and – like Lambert – was often punished for misbehaving in class. The precise details of the school also reflect Balzac's time there: as described in the novel, students were allowed to keep pigeons and tend gardens, and holidays were spent in the dormitories.

Lambert's essay about metaphysics, Traité de la Volonté ("Treatise on the Will"), is another autobiographical reference. Balzac wrote the essay himself as a boy, and – as in the novel – it was confiscated by an angry teacher. Lambert's genius and philosophical erudition are reflections of Balzac's self-conception. Similarly, some critics and biographers have suggested that Lambert's madness reflects (consciously or not) Balzac's own unsteady mental state. His plans to run for parliament and other non-literary ambitions led observers at the time to suspect his sanity.

The many letters in the novel written by Lambert are also based on Balzac's life. After finishing the first version of the book, Balzac tried to win the heart of the Marquise de Castries by sending her a fragmented love letter from the book. Lambert's letters to his uncle about life in Paris from 1817 to 1820, meanwhile, mirror Balzac's own sentiments while attending the Sorbonne at the same time.

=== Swedenborg and metaphysics ===
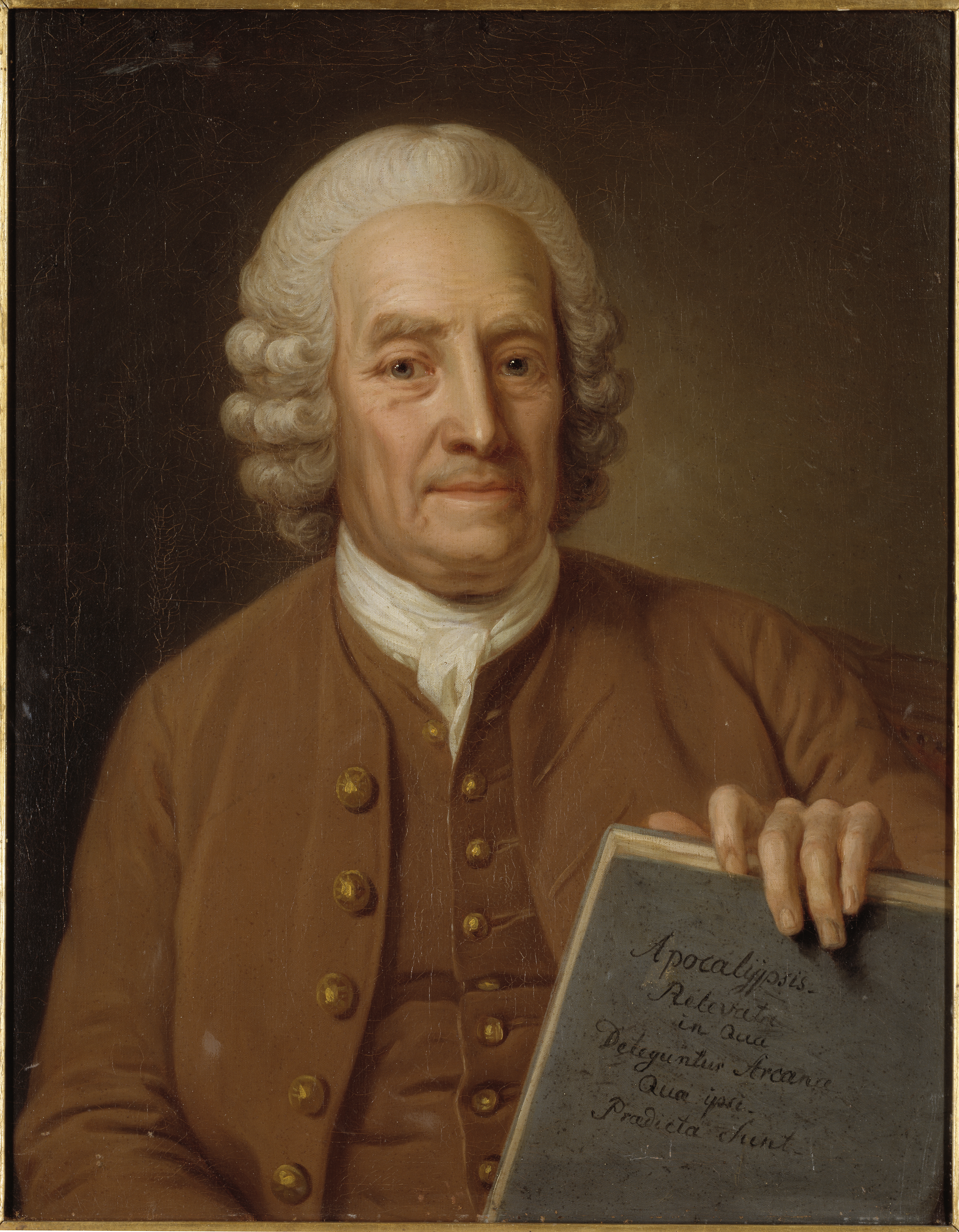
Emanuel Swedenborg's work, especially Heaven and Hell, profoundly influences the boy genius Louis Lambert.

The ideas of Swedish philosopher Emanuel Swedenborg (and his disciple Louis Claude de Saint-Martin) are central to Louis Lambert. Madame de Staël is impressed by Lambert when she finds him in a park reading Swedenborg's metaphysical treatise Heaven and Hell (1758); the Swedish writer's ideas are later reproduced in Lambert's own comments about mind, soul, and will. Primary among these is the division of the human into an "inward" and "outward" being. The outward being, subject to the forces of nature and studied by science, manifests itself in Lambert as the frail, frequently sick boy. The inward being, meanwhile, contains what Lambert calls "the material substance of thought", and serves as the true life into which he gradually moves throughout the novel.

Swedenborg's concepts are explored with relation to language, pain, memory, and dreams. When the students take a trip to the nearby Château de Rochambeau, for example, Lambert, who has never visited the château, nevertheless recalls vivid memories of the place from a dream. Believing his spirit visited the place while his body slept, he ascribes the experience to "a complete severance of my body and my inner being" and "some inscrutable locomotive faculty in the spirit with effects resembling those of locomotion in the body".

Like his heroes Swedenborg and Saint-Martin, Balzac attempts in Louis Lambert to construct a viable theory to unify spirit and matter. Young Lambert attempts this goal in his Traité de la Volonté, which – having been confiscated by a teacher – is described by the narrator:

The word Will he used to connote ... the mass of power by which man can reproduce, outside himself, the actions constituting his external life.... The word Mind, or Thought, which he regarded as the quintessential product of the Will, also represented the medium in which the ideas originate to which thought gives substance.... Thus the Will and the Mind were the two generating forces; the Volition and the Idea were the two products. Volition, he thought, was the Idea evolved from the abstract state to a concrete state, from its generative fluid to a solid expression.... According to him, the Mind and Ideas are the motion and the outcome of our inner organization, just as the Will and Volition are of our external activity. He gave the Will precedence over the Mind.

The exploration of human will and thought is linked to Balzac's interest in Franz Mesmer, who postulated the theory of animal magnetism, a force flowing among humans. The narrator invokes Mesmer twice in the text, and describes a section of the Traité de la Volonté which reflects the animal-magnetic theory.

=== Religion ===
Balzac's spiritual crisis at the time of his first communion led him to explore the first Christian thinkers and the question of evil. As the French critic Philippe Bertault points out, much of the mysticism in Louis Lambert is related to that of early Christianity. In his letters, Lambert describes exploring the philosophies of Christianity, Hinduism, Buddhism, Islam, and Confucianism, among others. Tracing the similarities among these traditions, he declares that Swedenborg "undoubtedly epitomizes all of the religions—or rather the one religion—of humanity". The same theory informs Balzac's efforts, in Louis Lambert and elsewhere, to complement his Christian beliefs with occult mysticism and secular realism.

The church itself is a subject of Lambert's meditations, particularly with regard to the early Christian martyrs. The split between inward and outward realities, he suggests, serves to explain the ability of those being tortured and maimed to escape physical suffering through the will of the spirit. As Lambert says: "Do not the phenomena observed in almost every instance of the torments so heroically endured by the early Christians for the establishment of the faith, amply prove that Material force will never prevail against the force of Ideas or the Will of man?" This inward–outward split also serves to explain the Miracles attributed to Jesus, whom Lambert considers a "perfect" representation of unity between the two beings.

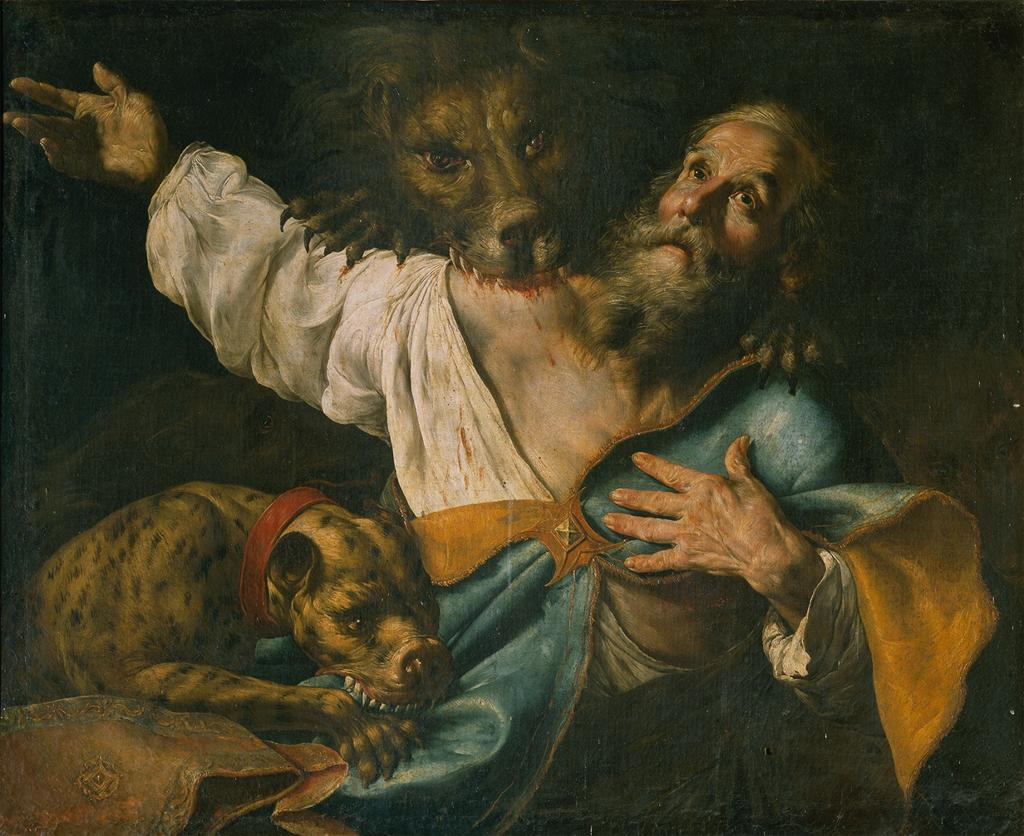
The ability of Christian martyrs – like Ignatius of Antioch, eaten by lions – to escape suffering through faith is described by Louis Lambert as proof of his Treatise on the Will.

The religious theme later appears in passages relating to angels. Discussing the contents of Swedenborg's Heaven and Hell, Lambert tries to convince the narrator of the existence of angels, described as "an individual in whom the inner being conquers the outer being". The boy genius himself is seen as an example of this process: his physical body withers and sickens, while his spiritual enlightenment expands, reaching its apex with his comment to the narrator: "The angels are white." Pauline, meanwhile, is described as "the angel" and "Angel-woman". Their parallel angelic states merge into what critic Charles Affron calls "a kind of perfect marriage, a spiritual bond that traverses this world and the next". Balzac later returned to the question of angels in other works of the Études philosophiques, particularly Séraphîta.

=== Genius and madness ===
Convinced that he was himself a genius, Balzac used Louis Lambert to explore the difficulty of geniuses in society, as well as their frequent progression into madness. He had been troubled greatly when, at Vendôme, he watched a schoolmate's mental condition deteriorate severely. Lambert's madness is represented most vividly in his attempt at self-castration, followed by years spent in a catatonic state. This transformation is in many ways a byproduct of his genius; because his brilliance is condemned by teachers and incompatible with the society of the other children, Lambert finds himself rejected by the world. He finds no more success in Paris, where he is led to "eat my heart out in misery". He becomes a vegetable, removed from the physical world entirely.

As a reflection of Balzac himself, Lambert also embodies the author's self-image as a brilliant writer, but one who acknowledges suspicions about his mental health. Some of his stories and public statements – as well as his fall prior to writing the novel – had led some observers to question Balzac's sanity. The protagonist's madness in Louis Lambert only added weight to these claims. As biographer Graham Robb writes: "It was typical of Balzac to douse a fire with petrol."

== Reception and legacy ==
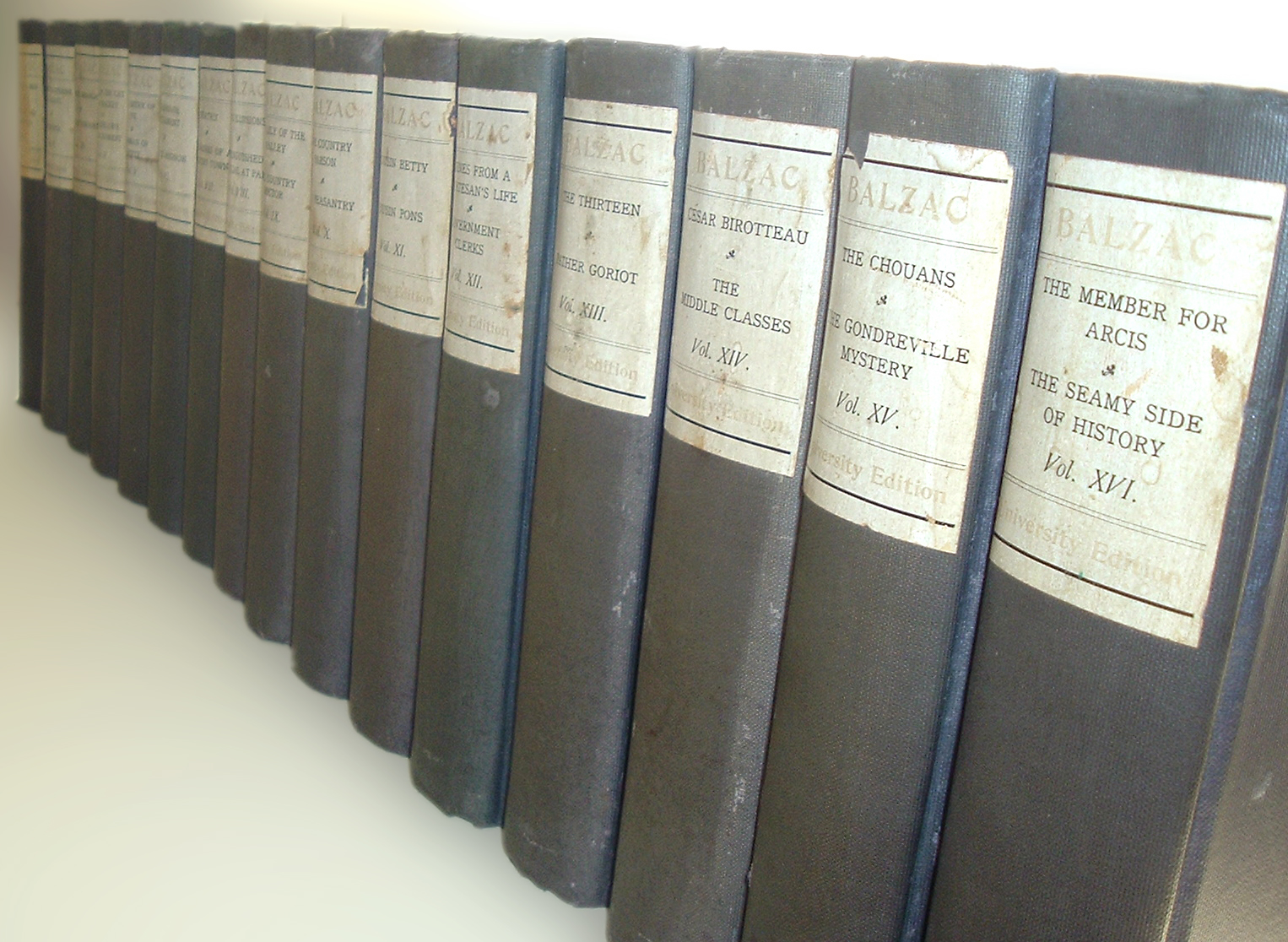
Balzac's novel-sequence La Comédie humaine

Balzac was fiercely proud of Louis Lambert and believed that it elegantly represented his diverse interests in philosophy, mysticism, religion, and occultism. When he sent an early draft to his lover at the time, however, she predicted the negative reception it would receive. "Let the whole world see you for themselves, my dearest," she wrote, "but do not cry out to them to admire you, because then the most powerful magnifying glasses will be directed at you, and what becomes of the most exquisite object when it is put under a microscope?" Critical reaction was overwhelmingly negative, due mostly to the book's lack of sustaining narrative. Conservative commentator Eugène Poitou, on the other hand, accused Balzac of lacking true faith and portraying the French family as a vile institution.

Balzac was undeterred by the negative reactions; referring to Louis Lambert and the other works in Le Livre mystique, he wrote: "Those are books that I create for myself and for a few others." Although he was often critical of Balzac's work, French author Gustave Flaubert was influenced – perhaps unconsciously – by the book. His own story "La Spirale", written in the 1850s, bears a strong plot resemblance to Balzac's 1832 novel.

While the three editions of Louis Lambert were being revised and published, Balzac was developing a scheme to organize all of his novels – written and unwritten. He called the scheme La Comédie humaine ("The Human Comedy"), and envisioned it as a panoramic look at every part of French life at the time. He placed Louis Lambert in the section named Études philosophiques ("Philosophical Studies"), where it remained throughout his fifteen-year refinement of the project. He returned to the themes of the novel in his later work Séraphîta, which follows the travails of an androgynous angelic creature. Balzac also inserted Lambert and his lover Pauline into later works – as he often did with characters from earlier novels – most notably in the story Un drame au bord de la mer ("A Drama at the Sea's Edge").

== Bibliography ==
- Affron, Charles. Patterns of Failure in La Comédie Humaine. New Haven: Yale University Press, 1966. OCLC 275265.
- Balzac, Honoré de. Louis Lambert. The Works of Honoré de Balzac. Vol. II. Philadelphia: Avil Publishing Company, 1901. OCLC 9435435.
- Bellos, David. Balzac Criticism in France, 1850–1900: The Making of a Reputation. Oxford: Clarendon Press, 1976. ISBN 0-19-815530-1.
- Bertault, Philippe. Balzac and the Human Comedy. Trans. Richard Monges. New York: New York University Press, 1963. ISBN 0-8147-0042-X.
- Dedinsky, Brucia L. "Development of the Scheme of the Comedie Humaine: Distribution of the Stories". The Evolution of Balzac's Comédie humaine. Ed. E. Preston Dargan and Bernard Weinberg. Chicago: The University of Chicago Press, 1942. OCLC 905236. pp. 22–187.
- Hunt, Herbert J. Balzac's Comédie Humaine. London: University of London Athlone Press, 1959. OCLC 4566561.
- Marceau, Felicien. Balzac and His World. Trans. Derek Coltman. New York: The Orion Press, 1966. OCLC 236621.
- Maurois, André. Prometheus: The Life of Balzac. New York: Carroll & Graf, 1965. ISBN 0-88184-023-8.
- Oliver, E. J. Balzac the European. London: Sheed and Ward, 1959. OCLC 4298277.
- Pugh, Anthony R. Balzac's Recurring Characters. Toronto: University of Toronto Press, 1974. ISBN 0-8020-5275-4.
- Robb, Graham. Balzac: A Biography. New York: W. W. Norton & Company, 1994. ISBN 0-393-03679-0.
- Rogers, Samuel. Balzac & The Novel. New York: Octagon Books, 1953. LCCN 75-76005.
- Saintsbury, George. "Introduction". The Works of Honoré de Balzac. Vol. II. Philadelphia: Avil Publishing Company, 1901. OCLC 9435435. pp. ix–xiii.
- Sprenger, Scott. "Balzac as Anthropologist" (on Louis Lambert). Anthropoetics VI, 1, 2000, 1–15.
- Sprenger, Scott. ""Balzac, Archéologue de la conscience," Archéomanie: La mémoire en ruines, eds.Valérie-Angélique Deshoulières et Pascal Vacher, Clermont Ferrand: Presses Universitaires Blaise Pascal, CRLMC, 2000, 97–114.
- Stowe, William W. Balzac, James, and the Realistic Novel. Princeton: Princeton University Press, 1983. ISBN 0-691-06567-5.
