= Les Proscrits =

Short story by Honoré de Balzac

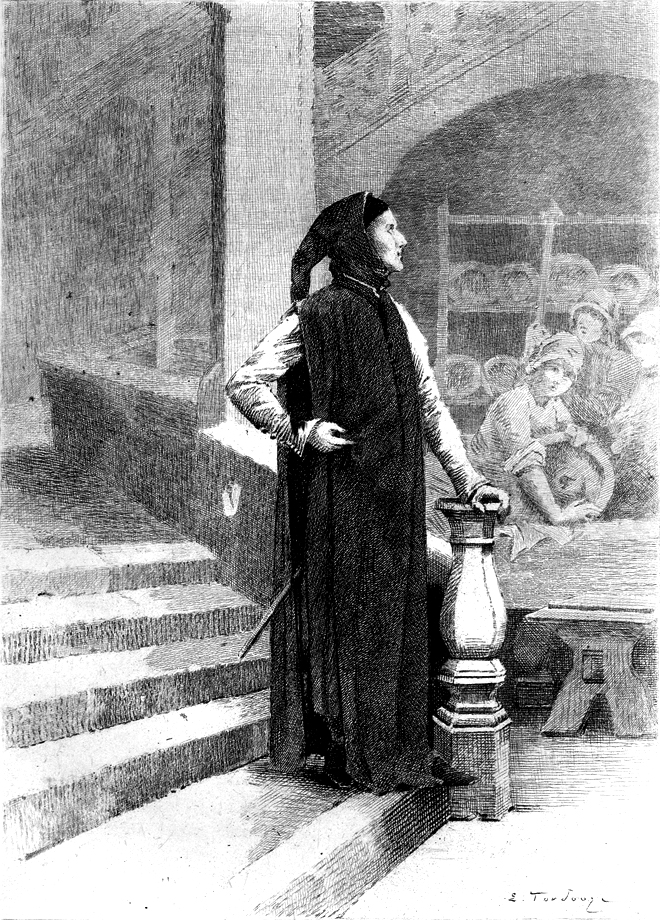
- Image from Les Proscrits
- Author: Honoré de Balzac
- Illustrator: Édouard Toudouze
- Language: French
- Series: La Comédie humaine
- Publisher: Charles Gosselin
- Publication date: 1831
- Publication place: France
- Preceded by: Gambara
- Followed by: Louis Lambert

Les Proscrits (sometimes translated into English as The Exiles) is a French short story by Honoré de Balzac, published in 1831 by éditions Gosselin, then in 1846 by Furne, Dubochet, Hetzel in Études philosophiques. He subtitled it an esquisse historique. It forms part of the Livre Mystique, as do Louis Lambert and Séraphîta, and shares several of the themes of Louis Lambert - doctor Sigier's theory that intelligence knows several avatars, from animal intelligence to angels' intelligence, and the idea that angels live among men, which often recurs in Balzacs' descriptions of women (Esther, the fallen angel in Splendeurs et misères des courtisanes, looks like an angel and ends her life in a kind of angelic redemption).

== Plot ==
At the start of the 14th century, sergeant Tirechair lives in a dark house near Notre-Dame de Paris. He plays host to two strangers, who frighten him and who he believes can carry out sorcery. The eldest is a gentleman who attends the royal court, while the youngest, (Godefroy, count of Gand), is the son of countess Mahaut and is taken on as a servant in the Tirechairs's house. The sergeant is preparing to throw them out the very same evening as they assist in a course in mystical theology. Doctor Sigier is introduced, as is his theory on the mysteries of creation.

The old gentleman, proscribed by his native land of Italy, is none other than the poet Dante Alighieri. A knight arrives to tell Dante he has been allowed to return to Florence, his native town. As for Godefroy, about to commit suicide to rejoin the angels, Dante saves him in extremis and Godefroy ends by re-assuming his position as a nobleman and rediscovering his mother.

In his introduction to Études philosophiques, Balzac stated:

The warm and scholarly study of Les Proscrits contains two identical propositions - the suicide of a child disgusted with life who wants to reach for the sky, and the genius which becomes fatal to a great poet.

== Bibliography ==
- Les Proscrits on French Wikisource
- The Exiles on Project Gutenberg
- Wayne Conner, « En marge des Proscrits : Vigny lecteur de Balzac », L'Année balzacienne, 1974, p. 322-23.
- Allan H. Pasco, « Les Proscrits et l’unité du ‘Livre mystique’ », L’Année balzacienne, juil. 1999, n° 20 (1), p. 75-92.
- Maxime Prévost, « Écrire la voyance : présence de Dante Alighieri dans Les Proscrits de Balzac », Études Littéraires, Printemps 2006, n° 37 (2), p. 87-98.
