= Château de Saché =

Writer's house museum in France

Coordinates: 47°14′45″N 0°32′40″E

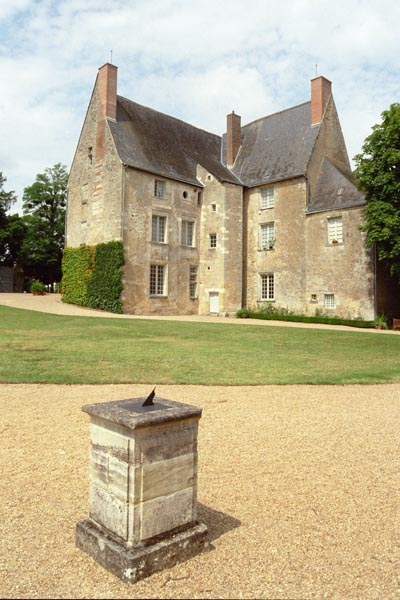
Château de Sache, near Tours, France

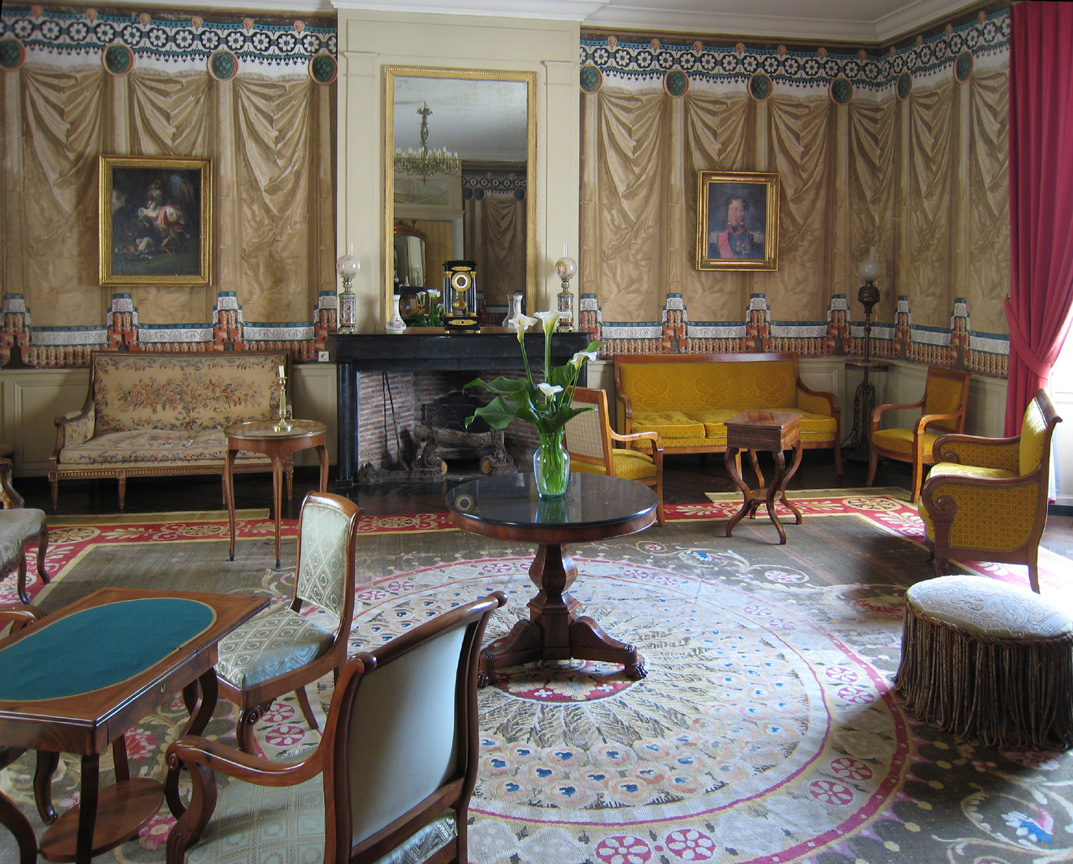
Grand parlor

The Château de Saché is a writer's house museum located in a home built from the converted remains of a feudal castle. Located in Saché, Indre-et-Loire, between 1830 and 1837, it is where French writer Honoré de Balzac wrote many of his novels in the series La Comédie Humaine in which he attempted to reflect every aspect of French society at that time.

The château was owned by Balzac's friend, Jean de Margonne, his mother's lover and the father of her youngest child. The writer would often spend long periods staying here, away from his turbulent life in Paris, writing 14 to 16 hours a day. After supper he would sleep a few hours, wake around midnight and write until morning, sustained by large amounts of coffee.

Since 1951, the château has been open as an evocative museum dedicated to Balzac. His small second-floor bedroom has a simple bed and writing desk where so many of his often tormented characters were conceived.

The château was built upon the foundations of a twelfth-century fortified house, of which a cylindrical tower and dry moats remain. The building was successively transformed in the 16th through 18th centuries. It has been listed as a monument historique since June 1983 by the French Ministry of Culture.

== See also ==
- List of castles in France
