= Robiquet =

Robiquet is a French surname. Notable people with the surname include:

- Jean Robiquet, French art historian, art critic, and curator
- Marie Lucas Robiquet (1858–1959), French Orientalist artist
- Pierre Jean Robiquet (1780–1840), French chemist
