= Addie C. Strong Engle =

American author and publisher

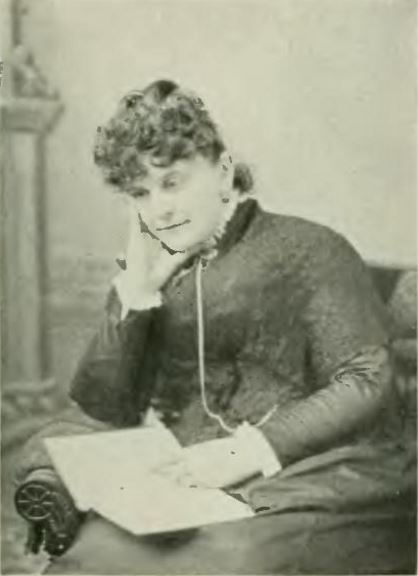
- Photo in A Woman of the Century
- Born: Adelaide Clarissa Strong; August 11, 1845; Manchester, Connecticut, US
- Died: June 27, 1926 (aged 80)
- Resting place: Crown Hill Cemetery, Section 60, Lot 1013, Indianapolis, Indiana, US
- Other name: "Addie"
- Occupations: author, publisher
- Spouses: John Hotchkiss Bario (m. 1866, divorced); Willis Darwin Engle (m. 1882; died 1925)
- Writing career
- Language: English
- Genres: short stories, poems
- Subjects: Masonic, Eastern Star, Relief Corps Orders

Addie C. Strong Engle (née, Strong; after first marriage, Bario; after second marriage, Engle; pen name, Addie C. S. Engle; August 11, 1845 – June 27, 1926) was an American author and publisher. She published many stories and poems. Following an injury, she wrote a serialized romance. Engle was one of the oldest Past Grand Matrons, Order of the Eastern Star, of Connecticut.

== Early life and education ==
Adelaide ("Addie") Clarissa Strong was born in Manchester, Connecticut, August 11, 1845. Her ather was Ethan Eli Strong (1816-1896). She traces her ancestry back to 1630, when John Strong came to the United States from Taunton, England. Her girlhood years were spent in the town of South Manchester, Connecticut and her later life, until 1882 in Meriden, Connecticut. As a child, she found writing as a recreation. Her talent for literary composition was inherited from her mother, Mary Benton Keeney (1815-1909), whose ancestors were among the earlier settlers of South Manchester. When a girl of sixteen, she sent an article upon one of the terrible war years then just ended to Zion's Herald, of Boston, in which it was printed as a leader, and she was engaged by its publisher to write a series of sketches for children.

== Career ==
Engle spent several years in teaching in South Manchester. On May 18, 1866, she married John Hotchkiss Bario (1844-1892), of Meriden. Their children included, Harry Strong Bario, Lina May Bario, Luia B. Mitchell, and Ethel B. McDavitt.

For years, she provided services to the Order of the Eastern Star, in which she was honored by being called three years to fill the highest office in Connecticut. In the discharge of the duties pertaining to that position, her executive ability and knowledge of jurisprudence won commendation as being "wonderful for a woman", a compliment she rather resented, as her pride and faith in the abilities of women were large.

Her stories and poems appeared for years in children's papers, the Voice of Masonry, the Churchman, and other periodicals. The odes used in the secret work of the Order of the Eastern Star and its memorial service were her contributions.

On April 19, 1882, she married Rev. Willis Darwin Engle (1846-1925), of Indianapolis, an Episcopal clergyman, and removed to Indiana. There, she at once became identified, outside of church work, with local organizations of the Eastern Star, the Woman's Relief Corps, the McAll Mission and the King's Daughters. With her husband, she commenced in 1889 the publication of a monthly illustrated magazine, the Compass, Star and Vidette, in the interest of the Masonic, Eastern Star, and Relief Corps Orders. The entire charge of the literary and children's departments fell upon her.

Her Puritan ancestry was evident in some of her opinions, yet she was very liberal, and sought progress and reform. She was a rapid talker, and when able to speak from the rostrum, was an eloquent one. In December, 1890, she ceased active participation in the work of the various societies to which she belonged, and became a "shut in" after a fall the winter before resulted in congestion of the spine. Laying in a hammock during a short lake trip in the summer of 1891, she wrote a romance in the form of a serial, which was published. An injury to her eyes impaired their appearance as well as their vision, and she wore glasses thereafter. As Addie C. S. Engle, she published, Retrospect, in 1892.

== Death and legacy ==
Engle died June 27, 1926, and was buried at Crown Hill Cemetery, in Indianapolis. In the following year, her daughters, Luia and Ethel, published, The mystic tie, a ceremony for use in eastern star work, on behalf of their mother.

== Selected works ==
=== As Addie C. S. Engle ===
- Retrospect, 1892

=== Published posthumously ===
- The mystic tie, a ceremony for use in eastern star work, 1927
