= Henry Ramsay =

Henry Ramsay may refer to:

- Henry Ramsay (Indian Army officer) (1816–1893), general in the Indian Army, Commissioner of the Kumaon and Garhwal districts
- Henry Ramsay (civil engineer) (1808–1886), American civil engineer
- Henry Ramsay (Neighbours), a fictional character from the Australian soap opera Neighbours
