= Louise Seymour Houghton =

- Born: November 22, 1838; Piermont, New York, U.S.
- Died: August 22, 1920 (aged 81); Huntington, New York, U.S.
- Education: Utica Female Seminary
- Occupations: writer; translator; editor; educator; settlement worker
- Spouse: Elihu R. Houghton (m. 1856; died 1898)
- Children: 5
- Relatives: Hezekiah C. Seymour (father)
- Writing career
- Language: English; French; German
- Genres: fiction; non-fiction
- Subject: Christianity
- Literary movement: settlement movement

Louise Seymour Houghton (November 22, 1838 – August 22, 1920) was an American religious writer, translator, and editor, as well as an educator, and settlement worker. She was affiliated with several organizations, including Vassar College, the McAll Mission and the Jacob A. Riis Settlement of Manhattan. Houghton traveled, lectured, and wrote extensively.

== Early life and education ==
Louise Seymour was born in Piermont, New York, on November 22, 1838. Her parents were Hezekiah C. Seymour, who served as New York State Engineer and Surveyor, and Mary (Sherrill) Seymour.

Houghton began her education at home before she attended the Utica Female Seminary.

== Career ==
For several years, Houghton lived abroad in France, Germany, and Italy. In 1872-75, she was in Europe, where she became interested in the McAll Mission. She spent eight months, during 1904-05, in Syria and Palestine. She also traveled very extensively in United States.

Houghton was literary editor (1888–89), associate editor (1889-98), and editor-in-chief (1899-1902) of the New York Evangelist. From 1902 to 1904, she served as associate editor of the Christian Work, and associate editor and editor of Evangelist. She was also editorially connected with Leslie's Weekly for eight years; and Lippincott's Magazine for three years.

She was the author of The Sabbath Month; Fifine; Faithful to the End; Life of David Livingstone; The Bible in Picture and Story; The Life of Christ in Picture and Story; From Olivet to Patmos, in Picture and Story; Antipas and Other Children; The Log of the Lady Gray; The Life of the Lord Jesus; The Cruise of the Mystery; The Silent Highway; Telling Bible Stories; Hebrew Life and Thought; and The Russian Grandmother's Wonder Tales. She wrote numerous pamphlets on French subjects.

She translated Paul Sabatier's Life of St. Francis of Assisi (New York, 1895); Edmond Stapfer's Jesus Christ (3 vols., 1896–98); Auguste Sabatier's Religions of Authority and Religions of the Spirit (1903); and Georges Cain's The Byways of Paris(Duffield, 1912). Houghton also translated other works from French and German. She collaborated with Mary Houghton on French by reading, a progressive French method.

Houghton lectured on the Bible, Syria and Palestine, France, the McAll Mission, and philanthropic subjects.

In 1892-95, she was connected with the English department of Vassar College.

She served as corresponding secretary of the New York auxiliary of the McAll Mission from 1888, and as a director of the American McAll Association, Philadelphia, since 1896.

In 1889, Houghton became a charter member of the first religious settlement in the United States, the King's Daughters Settlement, later renamed the Jacob A. Riis Settlement of Manhattan. She served as first vice-president from 1889 to 1904.

Houghton was a member of the Woman's Christian Temperance Union; Brotherhood of the Kingdom, New York City and Marlborough, New York; Woman's Press Club of New York City; Meridan Club; and the Story Tellers' League.

== Personal life ==
In Piermont, on December 30, 1856, she married Elihu R. Houghton (died 1898). They had several children: Mary, Augustus Seymour (lawyer), Henry (architect), Daisy, and E. Russell Houghton, M.D. (died 1905).

In religion, she was Episcopalian, belonging to the Broad Church.

Houghton died at her home in Huntington, New York, on August 22, 1920.

== Selected works ==
=== Books ===
- Antipas, son of Chuza and others whom Jesus loved (1895) (text)
- The Bible in Picture and Story (New York, 1889)
- Cruise of the "Mystery" in McAll Mission Work (1891)
- Das leben Jesu in bild und erzählung (in German, 1893) (text)
- Faithful to the End, The Story of Emile Cook's Life, Adapted From the French (1881) (text)
- Fifine : a story of the Paris workmen's mission (1898) (Japanese translation)
- From Olivet to Patmos, in Picture and Story (1891) (text)
- Golden thoughts in pen and pencil (1889) ()
- Handbook of French and Belgian Protestantism (1919) (text)
- Hebrew Life and Thought: Being Interpretative Studies in the Literature of Israel (Chicago, 1906) (text)
- How to tell bible stories (1929) (text)
- Life of David Livingstone—the story of one who followed Christ (1882) (text)
- Our debt to the red man; the French-Indians in the development of the United States (1918) (text)
- Selections from the Old Testament (1916) (text)
- The Cry of the Penitent. A Babylonian Prayer, (1903) (text)
- The Sabbath Month: : Devotional Thoughts for Young Mothers (Philadelphia, 1879)
- The Life of Christ in Picture and Story (1890) (text)
- The Life of the Lord Jesus (1895) (text)
- The Log of the "Lady Gray" (1896)
- The Russian Grandmother's Wonder Tales (New York, 1906) (text)
- The Sabbath month : devotional thoughts for young mothers (1879) (text)
- The Silent Highway; a Story of the McAll Mission (text)
- Telling Bible Stories (1905) (text)
- Wanted: A Test for Pauperism (1888) (text)

=== Articles ===
- "The National Conference of Charities and Corrections", The North American Review (October 1, 1888) (text)
- "Women and War-Policies", The North American Review (May 1, 1889) (text)

=== Collaborations ===
- French by reading, a progressive French method, with Mary Hayes Houghton (1891) (text)

=== Translations ===
- Bordeaux, Henry, The House (New York, 1914) (text)
- Bordeaux, Henry, The parting of the ways (New York, Duffield, 1911) (text)
- Boylesve, René, You no longer count (Tu n'es plus rien!) (text)
- Cain, Georges, The Byways of Paris (New York, Duffield, 1912) (text)
- Pinard, Ernest, Unpublished correspondence of Napoleon I : preserved in the War Archives (Volume 1), (Volume 2), (Volume 3)
- Gustave Rodrigues, The people of action, an essay on American idealism, 1918 (text)
- Sabatier, Auguste, Religions of Authority and Religions of the Spirit (1903) (text)
- Sabatier, Paul, Life of St. Francis of Assisi (New York, 1894) (text)
- Stapfer, Edmond, Jesus Christ Before His ministry, 1896 (text)
- Stapfer, Edmond, Jesus Christ During His Ministry (3 vols., 1896–98) (text
- Stapfer, Edmond, The death and resurrection of Jesus Christ, 1898 (text)

== Gallery ==
Antipas, son of Chuza and others whom Jesus loved

Das leben Jesu in bild und erzählung

Life of David Livingstone

Handbook of French and Belgian Protestantism

Jesus Christ Before His ministry

Jesus Christ During His Ministry

Life of St. Francis of Assisi

Our debt to the red man

Religions of authority and the religion of the spirit

Telling Bible stories

The Byways of Paris

The death and resurrection of Jesus Christ

The life of the Lord Jesus

The people of action

The Russian grandmother's wonder tales

The Sabbath month

The silent highway; a story of the McAll mission

You no longer count (Tu n'es plus rien!)
