= William J. McAlpine =

American civil engineer and politician

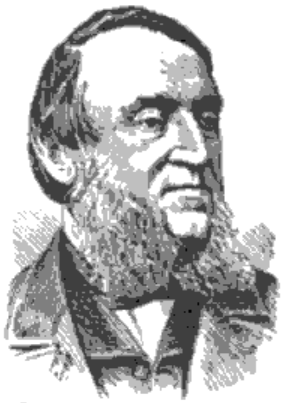
- Born: William Jarvis McAlpine; April 30, 1812; New York City
- Died: February 16, 1890 (aged 77); New Brighton, Staten Island
- Title: New York State Engineer and Surveyor
- Term: 1852–1853
- Spouse: Sarah Learned (c1815-1900)
- Children: Sarah J. McAlpine Pollock; Catherine McAlpine Pollock
- Parent(s): John H. McAlpine (1783–1865); Elizabeth Jarvis (1792–1879)

William Jarvis McAlpine (April 30, 1812 – February 16, 1890) was an American civil engineer and politician from New York. He was New York State Engineer and Surveyor from 1852 to 1853.

== Life ==
William J. McAlpine was born in New York City, the son of John H. McAlpine (1783–1865) and Elizabeth (Jarvis) McAlpine (1792–1879). In 1827, he began civil engineering as a pupil of John B. Jervis, with whom he remained until 1836. He was Assistant Engineer of the Mohawk and Hudson Railroad from 1830 to 1831, and of the St. Lawrence Improvement Company in 1832. From 1833 on, he took part in the construction of the Chenango Canal and the enlargement of the Erie Canal, and succeeded Jervis as Chief Engineer of the Eastern Division of the State canals, and was Resident Engineer from 1838 to 1846. From 1846 to 1849 he was Chief Engineer of the dry dock at the Brooklyn Navy Yard. He also designed and built the Albany water works in 1850 and 1851, and the Chicago water works from 1851 to 1854.

As a Democrat, he was New York State Engineer and Surveyor from 1852 to August 1, 1853, when he resigned.

From 1855 to 1857, he was a New York State Railroad Commissioner. Afterwards he became Chief Engineer and Assistant to the President of the Erie Railroad, and later Chief Engineer and Vice-President of the Galena and Chicago Union Railroad. He was general superintendent of the Ohio and Mississippi Railroad, eastern division, for the years 1861 through 1864.

In 1869, he was a member of the Brooklyn Bridge Design Review Committee. In 1886, he was the first Director of the construction of Washington Bridge over the Harlem River in New York City, but resigned after a few months of planning.

He was a member of the American Society of Civil Engineers, and its President from 1868 to 1869. He was the first American elected to membership in the Institution of Civil Engineers of Great Britain.

He died in New Brighton, Staten Island on February 16, 1890.

== Sources ==
- Hough, Franklin Benjamin, compiler (1858). The New York Civil List. Albany: Weed, Parsons and Co. pp. 37f and 46.
- Renner, James (May 2003). "History of WaHI". Washington Heights & Inwood Online.

Political offices
Preceded by Hezekiah C. Seymour	New York State Engineer and Surveyor; 1852–1853	Succeeded by Henry Ramsay
