= Jean Robiquet =

French art historian, art critic and curator

- Born: 6 July 1874; Meudon
- Died: 26 March 1960 (aged 85); Biarritz
- Occupations: Art historian Playwright; Librettist; Museum curator

Jean Robiquet (6 July 1874 – 26 March 1960) was a French art historian, art critic and curator. He was also a playwright and opérettes librettist known under the pseudonym Jean Roby.

== Biography ==
Attached to the Musée Carnavalet in 1897, he became assistant curator in 1904, then chief curator from 1919 to his retirement in 1934. From that date, he set up the organization of the musée du Domaine départemental de Sceaux of which he was the custodian up to 1940. He was also responsible for organizing numerous exhibitions in Sceaux, Bagatelle, in the Orangerie as well as in Carnavalet. In addition to his publications, he contributed to several magazines and newspapers.

He was made an officer of the Legion of Honour.

== Publications ==
=== Prefaces ===
- 1923: Une tournée dans le vieux Paris, in Paris renseignements pratiques à l'usage de ses visiteurs, Paris syndicat d'initiatives
- 1928: François Boucher, Les boiseries du musée Carnavalet, Paris, Frazier-Soye
- 1929: Prosper Dorbec, L'Histoire de Paris au musée Carnavalet, Paris, Rieder
- 1930: Le théâtre à Paris au XVIIIe siècle [lectures at the musée Carnavalet 1n 1929], with 16 illustrations inset, Paris, Payot
- 1931: Marguerite Charageat, Chefs-d'œuvre des musées de province, [1e exposition, École française XVIIe et XVIIe siècles, peintures et dessins des musées d'Amiens, Caen, Dijon, Laon…], musée national de l'Orangerie, Éditions des Musées, 80 p.
- 1933: Marguerite Charageat, Chefs-d'œuvre des musées de province, [2e exposition, École française XVIIe et XVIIe siècles, peintures et dessins des musées d'Amiens, Angers, Auxerre, Besançon…], musée national de l'Orangerie, Éditions des Musées, 81 p.
- 1935: Les chefs-d'œuvre du Musée de Grenoble, [exposition au Petit Palais à Paris]
- 1938: Trouville, Deauville, cités voisines, [pages d'histoire locale], Trouville-sur-Mer, librairie Foucault

=== Collaborations ===
- Jean Robiquet (dir.), « la Parisienne par l'image : trois siècles de grâces féminines », in Le Panorama, Paris, Éd. L. Baschet, 1895
- Musée rétrospective des classes 85 & 86 : le costume et ses accessoires à l'exposition universelle internationale de 1900, à Paris, notices-rapports de Georges Cain, Henri Caïn, Jules Claretie, Lucien Duchet, François Flameng, Henri Lavedan, Maurice Leloir, Jean Robiquet. Imprimerie Belin frères, 1900. Reprint: Paris Conservatoire national des arts et métiers, 2014.
- La collection Dutuit au Petit-Palais des Champs-Élysées, with Georges Cain, Gaston Migeon, Édouard Rahir, Arsène Alexandre, 1 vol, Éditions Goupil, Paris, 1903, 37 p.
- L'œuvre inédit de Gavarni, with Léon Marotte, Paris, H. Floury, 1912
- Philippe Sagnac, La Révolution de 1789. Des origines au 30 septembre 1791, after Michelet, Thiers, Mignet, iconographie de l'époque réunie sous la direction de Jean Robiquet, Paris, Éd. nationales, 1934
- Philippe Sagnac, La Révolution de 1789. Du 30 septembre 1791 au 26 octobre 1795, after Michelet, Thiers, Mignet, iconographie de l'époque réunie sous la direction de Jean Robiquet, Paris, Éd. nationales, 1934

=== History ===
- 1925: Le musée Carnavalet, [guide du visiteur], 1 vol, in-12°, Paris, 78 p.
- 1927: Les Vieux hôtels du Marais et du quartier Saint-Paul, Collection de la Société des promenades, lectures "Pour connaître Paris", Paris, Hachette
- 1938: La femme dans la peinture française, XV-XXe siècle, preface by Henri de Régnier, Paris, Éditions nationales
- 1938: Saint-Lazarre, les vieux hôpitaux français, Lyon, laboratoires Ciba
- 1939: La vie quotidienne au temps de la Révolution, Corbeil, impr. Crété, Paris, Hachette, reprints in 1944, 1950, 1958, 1960, 1964
- 1942: La vie quotidienne au temps de Napoléon, Paris, Hachette, reprints in 1943, 1944, 1946, 1959, 1963; édition Famot, Genève, 1976
- 1948: La vie quotidienne en France, au temps de la Révolution, Paris, Hachette
- 1948: L'impressionnisme vécu, [histoire de l'art], Paris, R. Julliard

=== Theatre ===
- 1898: Couplets et rondeaux chantés, in Paris complote, revue in 1 act and 1 prologue by Édouard-Paul Lafargue and Jean Robiquet, Théâtre des Capucines, Paris, Imprimerie des arts et des lettres
- 1899: Balancez vos dames, comédie en vaudeville in 1 act in prose, from a tale by Jean de La Fontaine, with Édouard-Paul Lafargue, in-18, Paris, Librairie théâtrale, 44 p.
- 1900: Les Troqueurs, proverbe facétieux in 1 act and in prose, from a tale by Jean de La Fontaine, Paris, P. Ollendorff,
- 1902: Le Paradis perdu, fantaisie in 3 tableaux, including 1 prologue, Paris, G. Ondet
- 1913: L'Épouvantail, by Jean Roby and Paul Cazères, one acte in prose, Paris, C. Joubert,
- 1922: Contes et propos. Soit dit entre nous, by Jean Roby, illustration by Louis Morin, In-8°, Paris, Éditions La Force française, 119 p.

== Biography ==
- Qui êtes-vous ?, annuaire des contemporains, Paris, Rufy, 1924
- Who's Who in France, 1959-1960, Paris, Lafitte, 1960
- Henri Temerson, Biographies des principales personnalités françaises décédées au cours de l'année 1960, Paris chez l'auteur, 1961
