= Charles B. Stuart =

American politician

Charles Beebe Stuart
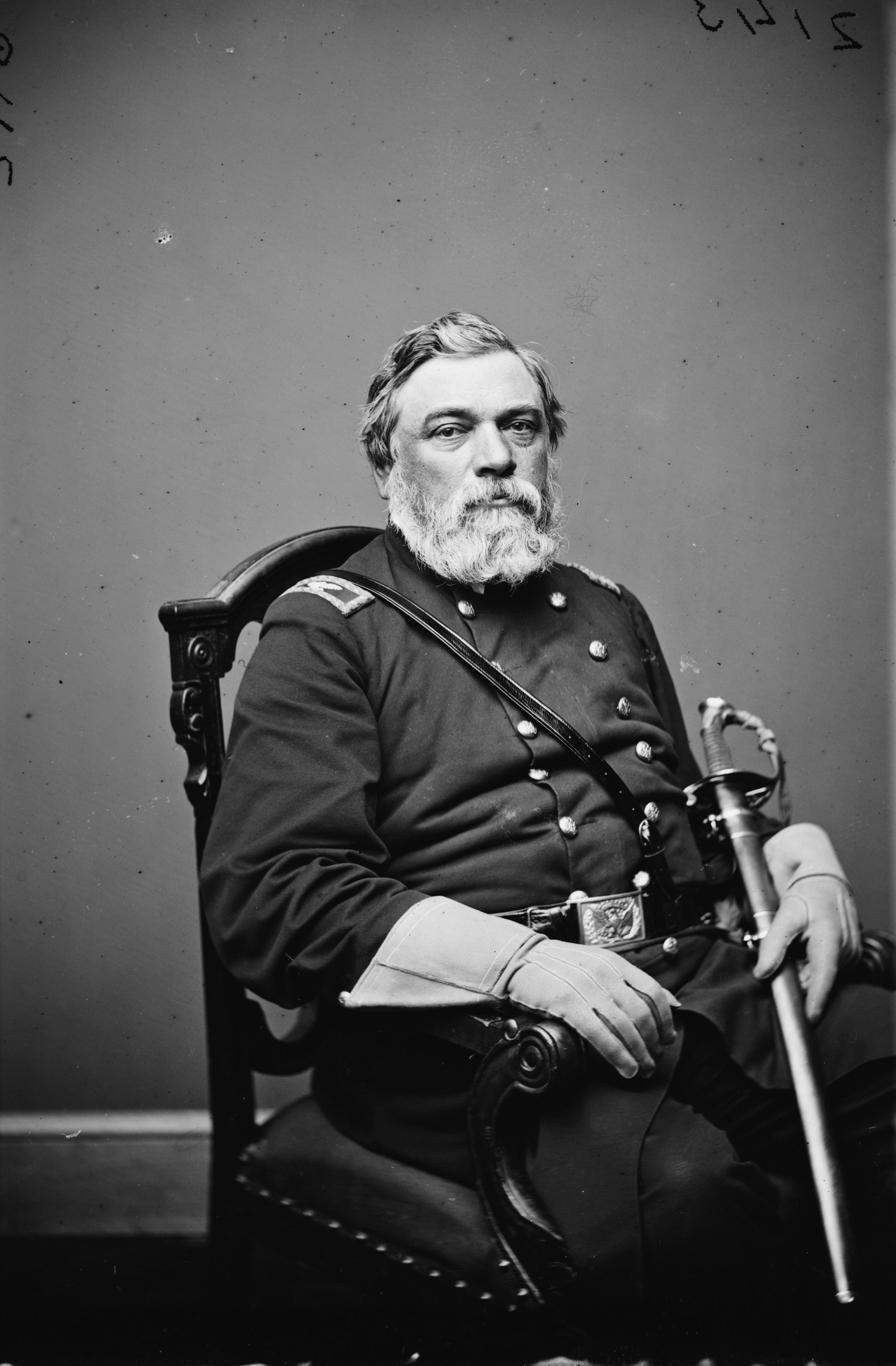
- Born: June 4, 1814; Chittenango Springs, New York, US
- Died: January 4, 1881 (aged 66); Cleveland, Ohio, US
- Military career
- Allegiance: United States; Union
- Branch: US Navy; Union Army
- Service years: 1850 - 1853 (Navy); 1861 - 1863 (Army)
- Rank: Colonel
- Conflicts: American Civil War

Charles Beebe Stuart (June 4, 1814 – January 4, 1881) was an American engineer, United States Navy and Union Army officer and politician.

== Biography ==
Stuart was born in Chittenango Springs, New York, and was educated in the common schools. He graduated from Union College. Afterwards he was engaged in the construction of the Philadelphia, Wilmington and Baltimore Railroad, and the Brooklyn dry docks.

He married Frances Maria Welles, daughter of General Henry Welles, and they had three children.

He was New York State Engineer and Surveyor from 1848 to 1849, elected on the Whig ticket. In November 1850, he was appointed Engineer-in-Chief, attached to the Bureau of Construction, Equipment and Repair of the United States Navy.

During the American Civil War, he raised the 50th New York Engineer Regiment, commanding it from 1861 to 1863. He built fortifications and bridges for the Army of the Potomac.

He died in Cleveland, Ohio on January 4, 1881, of gangrene which developed from a sprained ankle. At the time of his death, he was as Chief Engineer engaged in the construction of the Conotton Valley Railway.

Political offices
Preceded by Hugh Halsey as Surveyor General	New York State Engineer and Surveyor; 1848–1849	Succeeded by Hezekiah C. Seymour
