= Hugh Riddle (railroad executive) =

American railroad executive

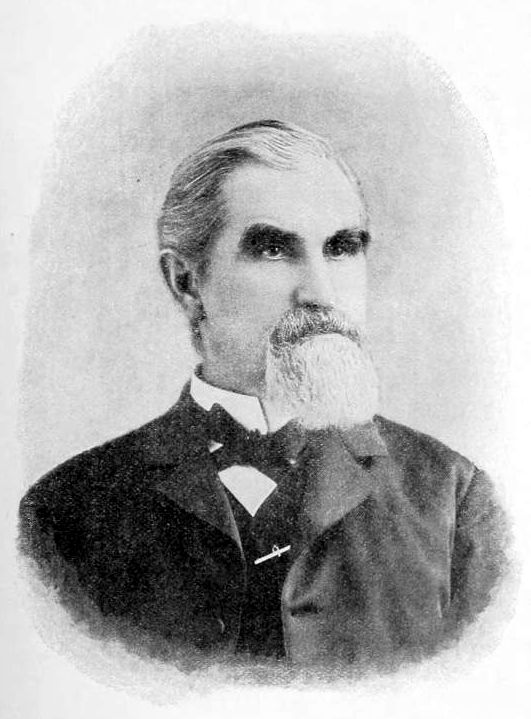
Hugh Riddle, railroad executive

Hugh Riddle (1822–1892) was an American railroad executive.

Early in his career he worked for the Erie Railroad, the Buffalo and State Line Railroad, and the Canandaigua and Niagara Falls Railroad. He served as General Superintendent of the Erie Railroad from January 1, 1864 to May 1, 1869 as successor of Charles Minot.

In 1869 he was appointed Superintendent of the Chicago, Rock Island and Pacific Railroad, became Vice-President in 1871, and served as President from 1877 to 1883.

== See also ==
- List of railroad executives

Business positions
Preceded by Charles Minot	General Superintendent of Erie Railroad; 1865-1869	Succeeded by L. D. Rucker
