= Ruben Saillens =

French musician, author, and pastor

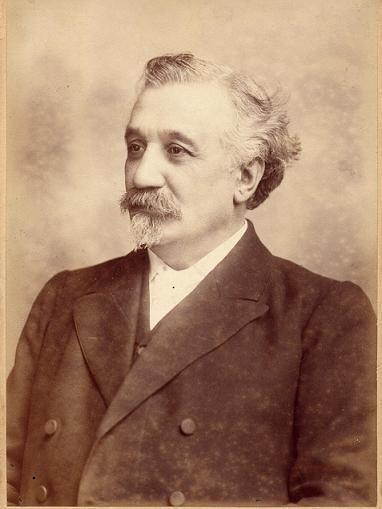
- Ruben Saillens
- Born: June 24, 1855; Saint-Jean-du-Gard
- Died: January 6, 1942 (aged 86)
- Resting place: Protestant cemetery, Condé-sur-Noireau
- Occupations: Protestant pastor and writer
- Spouse: Jeanne Crétin

Ruben Saillens (24 June 1855 – 5 January 1942) was a French musician, author, and pastor who became one of the most influential evangelical Protestants in the French-speaking world.

== Biography ==
Saillens was born in Saint-Jean-du-Gard on 24 June 1855. At the age of fifteen, during the Franco-Prussian War, he served with an ambulance crew. He was converted to evangelical Christianity in 1871. Although he had attended Free Evangelical churches (Eglises évangéliques libres), he discovered as a young man that Baptist beliefs better reflected his own convictions.

After studying at the East London Missionary Training Institute in 1873-74, and then joining with Robert W. McAll in his Paris ministry, he was ordained on 18 August 1879. Saillens then began a ministry in Marseille before returning to Paris in 1883. In 1888, he founded a Baptist church on the Rue Saint-Denis in Paris (later the Eglise et Mission du Tabernacle). In 1886, “his many talents led him to excessive work” and to a personal crisis. Following this experience, he invested considerable energy in the Baptist expansion throughout France, providing it with “decisive impetus.”

In 1905, wearied by internecine quarrels, he distanced himself from French Baptist churches and began to preach mainly in interdenominational settings in France and Switzerland, such as conventions in Nîmes, Chexbres, and Morges. In 1916, he took part in a series of meetings at Charles Spurgeon's Metropolitan Tabernacle in London, where he was introduced as “The Spurgeon of France.”

Saillens married Jeanne Crétin on 1 August 1877. In October 1921, they founded the Institut Biblique de Nogent-sur-Marne, in the eastern suburbs of Paris, a school for pastors and missionaries. Saillens also wrote a number of pamphlets, articles, and books, including The Soul of France (1916) and Le Mystère de la foi (1931). Saillens wrote and translated approximately 250 hymns, including the emblematic “La Cévenole,” sung every year by French Protestants at the ”Assemblée du Désert”(Mas Soubeyran).

As early as 1888, Saillens published a book of fables and allegories (Récits et Allégories) for the uneducated workers he sought to evangelize. "Le Père Martin," the most famous of these stories, is a Christmas tale about a shoemaker, a tale unwittingly plagiarized by Leo Tolstoy.

Emile-Guillaume Léonard, for many years the dean of the Department of Religious Sciences at the EPHE(Sorbonne), said his generation had been fascinated by “’revivalist’ pastors such as Ruben Saillens, who had so many talents” that “they bore about them a sense of hope, as though they could call fire down from Heaven.”

== Works ==
- Nos droits sur Madagascar et nos griefs contre les Hovas examinés impartialement, Paris, P. Monnerat, 1885.
- Dieu protège la France, Alençon, Impr. A.Lepage, 1885.
- A demi-voix, poèmes, Paris, P. Monnerat, 1886.
- La Cévenole illustrée, paroles de R.Saillens, musique de L.Roucaute, Valence, Impr. Réunies, Ducros et Lombart, 1926.
- The Soul of France, London, Morgan & Scott, 1916.
- Le mystère de la foi, Nogent-sur-Marne, Institut Biblique, 1931.
- Contes du dimanche, Paris, 1904. 2e ed., Nogent-sur-Marne, Institut Biblique, 1937.
- Le mystère de l’Église, Nogent-sur-Marne, Institut Biblique, 1938.
- Grâce et Vérité, Valence, Imprimeries Réunies, 1939.
