= Hezekiah C. Seymour =

American civil engineer and politician

Hezekiah Cook Seymour
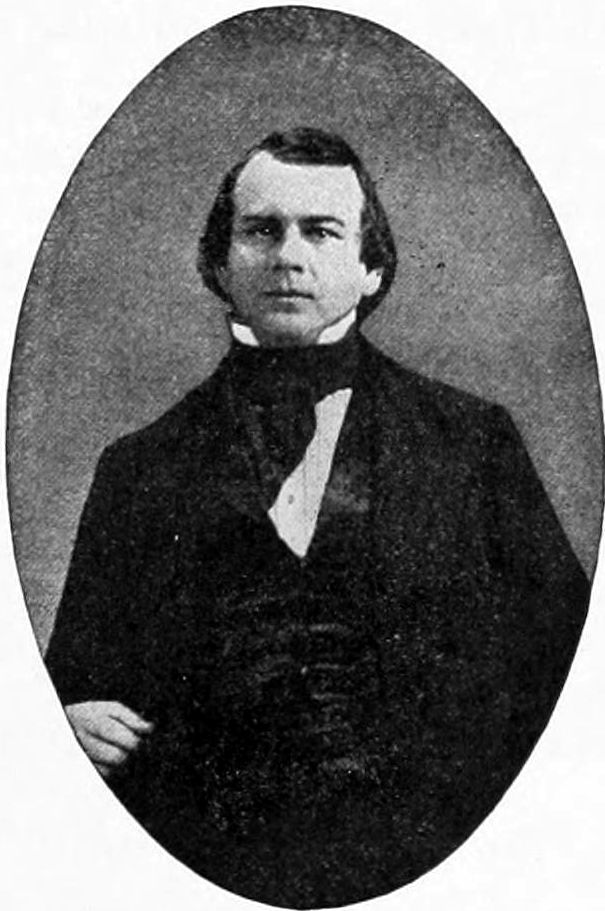
- Born: June 24, 1811; Westmoreland, New York
- Died: July 24, 1853 (aged 42); Piermont, New York
- Resting place: Rockland Cemetery; Sparkill, New York
- Title: New York State Engineer and Surveyor from
- Term: 1850-1851
- Predecessor: Charles Beebe Stuart
- Successor: William Jarvis McAlpine
- Spouse: Mary Sherrill
- Children: Amelia Seymour; Augustus Sherill Seymour (1836-1897); Louise Seymour Houghton
- Parent(s): Bradford Seymour; Mary Cook

Hezekiah Cook Seymour (June 24, 1811 – July 24, 1853) was an American civil engineer and politician. He served as general superintendent of the New York and Erie Railroad, as New York State Engineer and Surveyor, and in his final years as a principal contractor in the construction of railroads in the American West. The city of Seymour, Indiana, on the Ohio and Mississippi Railroad, was named for him.

== Biography ==
He was born on June 24, 1811, in Westmoreland, New York, to Bradford Steele Seymour and Mary Cook.

From 1835 to 1849, he worked for the New York and Erie Railroad, first as engineer, later becoming general superintendent.

He was New York State Engineer and Surveyor from 1850 to 1851, elected on the Whig ticket at the New York state election, 1849, but defeated for re-election at the New York state election, 1851 by Democrat William J. McAlpine.

In 1851, he became Chief Engineer of the Ontario, Simcoe and Huron Railway, running from Toronto to Lake Huron in Canada West. He transferred that office in the spring of 1852 upon becoming interested in railroad construction contracts involving a total expenditure exceeding $35 million, the most important of which were the Ohio and Mississippi Railroad, from Cincinnati to St. Louis; the Louisville and Nashville Railroad; and the Air Line Railroad between New York City and Boston. The earliest history of Jackson County, Indiana, describes the Ohio and Mississippi's "chief contractor and civil engineer, Mr. Seymour" as having superintended construction of the line from North Vernon, Indiana, to St. Louis.

The city of Seymour, Indiana, platted in 1852 at the planned crossing of the Ohio and Mississippi and the Jeffersonville Railroad, was named in his honor after landowner Meedy Shields agreed to name the new town for the railroad's engineer in exchange for the routing of the line across his property.

He died on July 24, 1853, in Piermont, New York, at age 42. He was buried at Rockland Cemetery in Sparkill, New York.

Business positions
Preceded by new position	General Superintendent of the Erie Railroad; 1841–1849	Succeeded by James P. Kirkwood
Political offices
Preceded by Charles B. Stuart	New York State Engineer and Surveyor; 1850–1851	Succeeded by William J. McAlpine
