= James P. Kirkwood =

American civil engineer

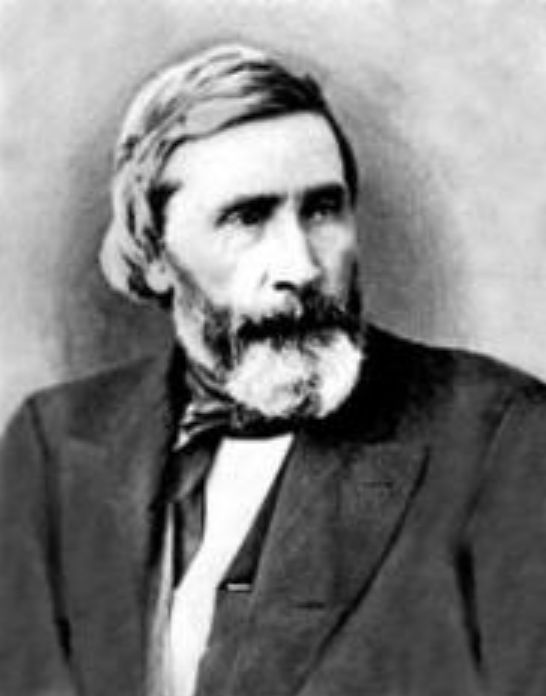
- Born: James Pugh Kirkwood; 27 March 1807; Edinburgh, Scotland
- Died: 22 April 1877 (aged 70); Brooklyn, New York, U.S.
- Burial place: Green-Wood Cemetery
- Education: Edinburgh College

James Pugh Kirkwood (27 March 1807 – 22 April 1877) was a 19th-century American civil engineer, and general superintendent of the Erie Railroad in the year 1849–1850. He left the Erie to go to the southwest to construct railroads, and he made the first survey for the Pacific Railroad (later the Missouri Pacific Railroad) west from the Mississippi to the Rocky Mountains. The towns of Kirkwood, Missouri and Kirkwood, New York are named in his honor. He served as president of the American Society of Civil Engineers (ASCE) from 1867 to 1868.

== Biography ==
Kirkwood was born in Edinburgh, Scotland He graduated at the Edinburgh College, and learned civil engineering on the Boston and Albany Railroad, an early work from which a number of engineers and contractors came to the Erie when it was being built.

Kirkwood had come to the United States in 1832 with letters to McNeill, who arranged work for him on the Norwich Worcester Railroad. He served on the Boston & Providence Railroad, and in 1835 became Assistant Engineer of the Stonington Railroad. In that same year he surveyed the route for the Long Island Rail Road, which was opened from the foot of Atlantic street to Hicksville in 1837. He had charge of the construction of that road until operations were stopped by the panic of 1837.

In 1840 Kirkwood was Resident Engineer on the Mountain Division of the Western Rail Road., where he remained until its completion in 1843. He located and constructed the Springfield & Northampton Rail Road. In 1848 he completed the Starrucca Viaduct as Superintendent in one season; The Starrucca Viaduct near Lanesboro, Pennsylvania, considered to be the most expensive railroad bridge at the time, as well as the largest stone viaduct, and for its first use of concrete in American bridge construction. This success led to his appointment as General Superintendent of the Erie Railroad on 1 April 1849, where he succeeded Hezekiah C. Seymour.

Only one year later at Erie Railroad, 1 May 1850, Kirkwood was succeeded by Charles Minot, and became Chief Engineer of the Missouri Pacific Railroad. the Pacific Railroad, and was responsible for the construction of the road from St. Louis to Pacific, Missouri. The towns of Kirkwood, Missouri, and Kirkwood, New York, are named after him. Late 1860s he consulted on and completed the Bergen Tunnel in 1858–9. At this time he was Engineer of the Brooklyn Water Supply, whose successful completion was largely due to his efforts.

In 1865 he was appointed Chief Engineer of St. Louis, Missouri, in charge of the design of a state-of-the-art waterworks. He served in that capacity until 1867, when he was replaced by Thomas Jefferson Whitman, brother of Walt Whitman. In 1867 he moved back to New York and served as president of the American Society of Civil Engineers from 1867 to 1868. In the last years of his life he was consulting engineer at the Lynn, Massachusetts water-works.

In 1877 Kirkwood died in Brooklyn, New York at the age of 70 and was buried in Green-Wood Cemetery.

== Work ==
=== Starrucca Viaduct ===
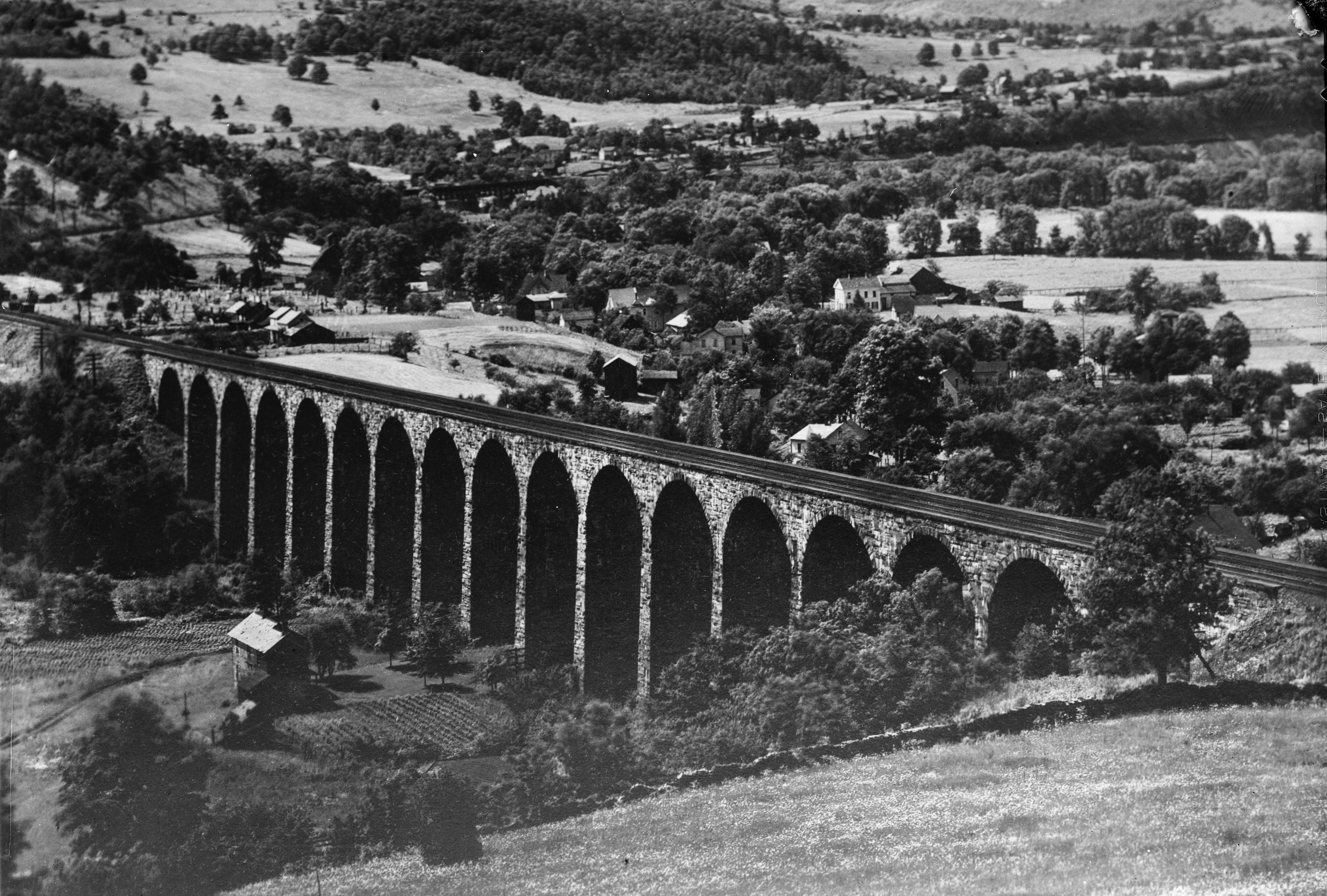
1920 picture of the Starrucca Viaduct.

The Starrucca Viaduct was designed by Julius W. Adams and James P. Kirkwood and built in 1847–1848 by New York and Erie Railroad, of locally quarried random ashlar bluestone, except for three brick interior longitudinal spandrel walls and the concrete base portions of the piers and deck covering. This may have been the first structural use of concrete in American bridge construction.

The viaduct was built to solve an engineering problem posed by the wide valley of Starrucca Creek. The railroad initially considered building an embankment, but abandoned the idea because it was impractical. The Erie Railroad was well-financed by British investors, but even with money available, most American contractors at the time were incapable of the task.

Julius W. Adams, the superintending engineer of construction in the area, hired James P. Kirkwood, a civil engineer who had previously worked on the Long Island Rail Road. Accounts differ as to whether Kirkwood worked on the bridge himself, or whether Adams was responsible for the plans with Kirkwood working as a subordinate. It took 800 workers, each paid about $1 per day, equal to $37.21 per day today, to complete the bridge in a year. The falsework for the bridge required more than half a million feet of cored and hewn timbers.

=== General superintendent of Erie Railroad ===
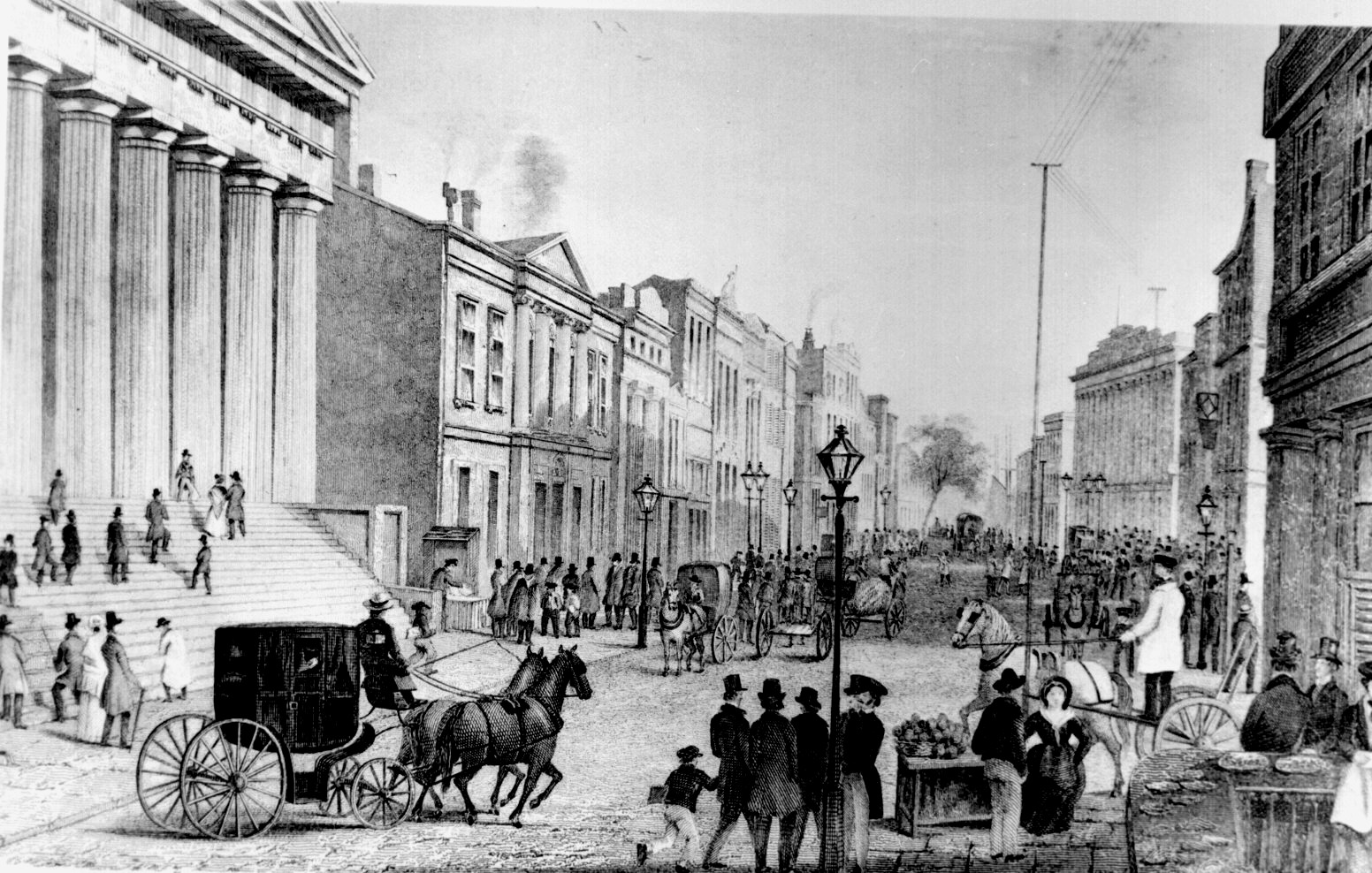
View of Wall Street with Erie Railroad office on nr. 56.

The first general superintendent, Hezekiah C. Seymour, came from Oneida County, and got the name on the road of the "Oneida Chief." In 1849 a successor to Superintendent Seymour was to be appointed, as he intended to quit the service. S. S. Post was superintendent of transportation. He was in the line of promotion to the general superintendency, and as he was very popular with the employees, they were delighted with the prospect of having him as their superintendent.

James P. Kirkwood was also mentioned in connection with the place. W. H. Stewart ran what was called the night line, and, in expectation of hearing the news somewhere along the line that Post had been elected superintendent, he had a big transparency, inscribed "S. S. Post, General Superintendent", all ready to light and display on his train. The news came, however, that Kirkwood was the choice of the Directors, and there was great disappointment among the "boys." This was in April, 1849. It is highly probable, though, that S.S. Post's long connection with the Railroad Company, and his popularity, would have secured him the place; if he had not shown an inclination to answer, in a non-committal way, queries put to him by the Directors, and a disposition to respond to them by asking questions himself.

Superintendent Kirkwood became known among the railroad men as the "Silent Man", from a peculiarity of his disposition. His office was at 56 Wall Street, New York. Audience with him was easily obtained, and as the caller entered, the superintendent would look up at him a moment. If the caller did not at once go on to mention the business that had brought him there, Kirkwood would turn his eyes back to his work without a word. Then the visitor might stand or sit there all the rest of the day without the Superintendent paying any more attention to him, or until the visitor broke the silence himself by speaking and making known his errand.

== See also ==
- Compton Hill Reservoir Park
- Long Dock Tunnel

== Selected publications ==
- James Pugh Kirkwood (1867) Brooklyn Water Works and Sewers: A Descriptive Memoir
- James Pugh Kirkwood, Saint Louis (Mo.). Board of Water Commissioners (1869) Report on the filtration of river waters: for the supply of cities, as practised in Europe, made to the Board of water commissioners of the city of St. Louis. D. Van Nostrand.

Business positions
Preceded by Hezekiah C. Seymour	General Superintendent of Erie Railroad; 1849–1850	Succeeded by Charles Minot
