= John T. Clark =

American civil engineer and politician

John T. Clark was an American civil engineer and politician from Utica, New York.

He was Resident Engineer and Superintendent of Transportation of the Mohawk and Hudson Railroad when on August 9, 1831, the first regular railway passenger service in the United States was begun and acted as conductor of the first journey of the train which was drawn by the DeWitt Clinton locomotive.

He was New York State Engineer and Surveyor from 1854 to 1855, elected on the Whig ticket.

== Sources ==
- Political Graveyard
- Google Books The New York Civil List compiled by Franklin Benjamin Hough (pages 37f; Weed, Parsons and Co., 1858)
- Letter written by Clark relating the maiden voyage of the DeWitt Clinton, at Rochester history
- A replica made for the World's Fair, in NYT on May 2, 1893

Political offices
Preceded by Henry Ramsay	New York State Engineer and Surveyor; 1854 - 1855	Succeeded by Silas Seymour
