= Georges Cain =

French painter

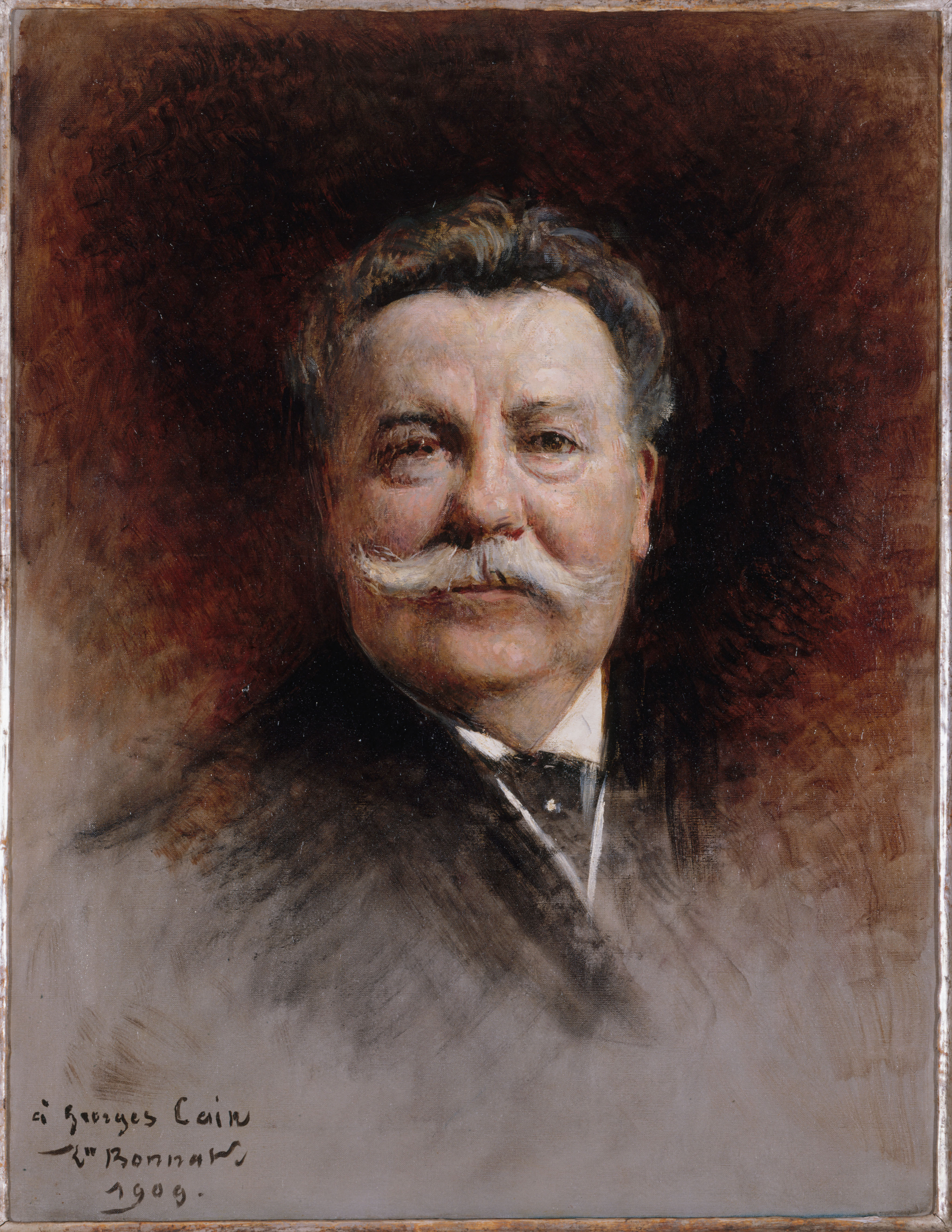
Georges Cain (Léon Bonnat 1909, musée Carnavalet)

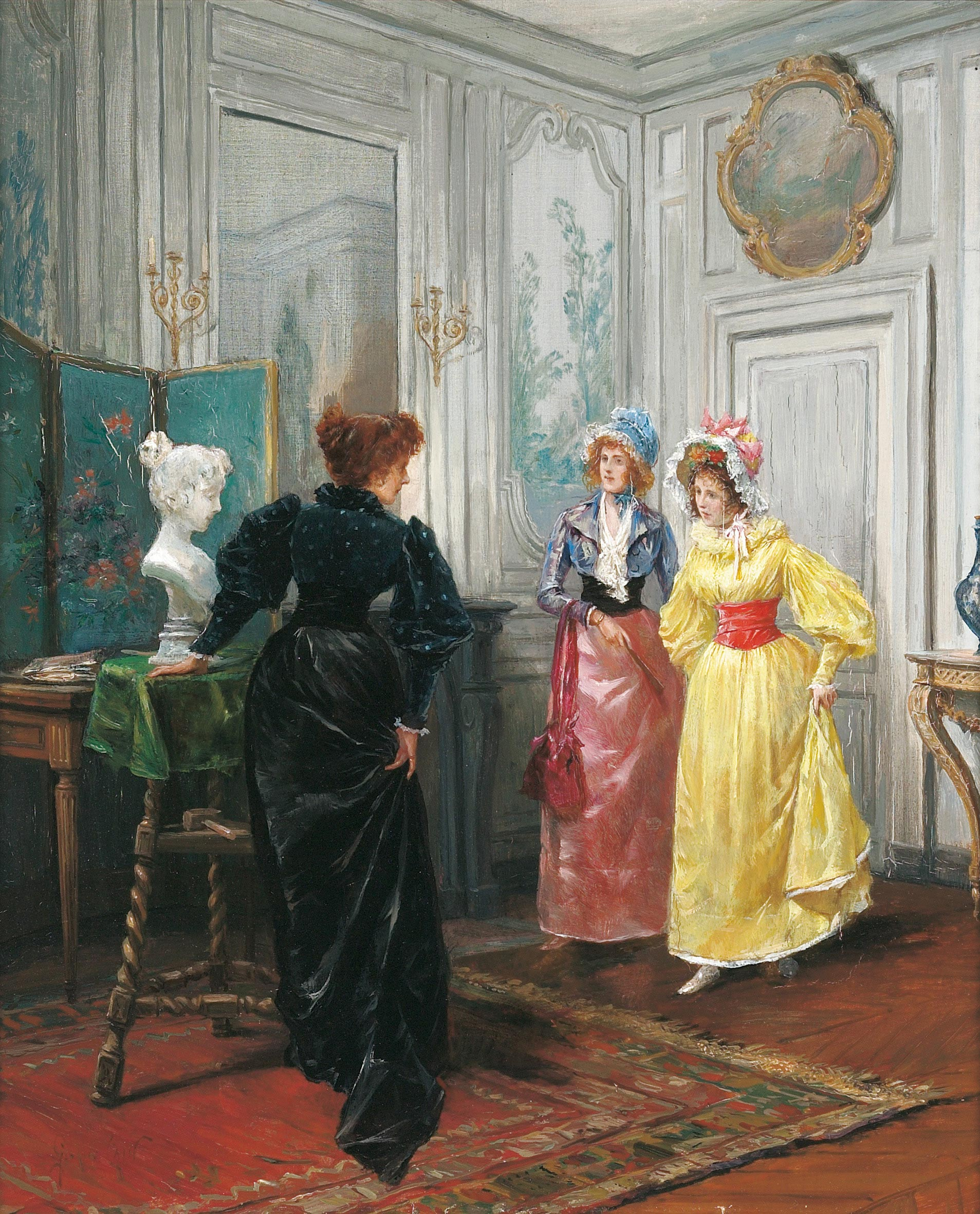
The Bust (date unknown)

Georges-Jules-Auguste Cain (16 April 1856, Paris – 4 March 1919, Paris) was a French painter, illustrator and writer, who specialized in the history of Paris, its monuments and its theaters.

== Biography ==
His grandfather, Pierre-Jules Mêne and his father, Auguste Cain were both animal sculptors. He studied with Alexandre Cabanel and Jean-Georges Vibert, but was most heavily influenced by Édouard Detaille. In 1878, he made his debut at the Salon with Fumeur de l'époque Louis XV (Smoker from the Time of Louis XV) and continued to exhibit there on a regular basis until 1900.

He illustrated the Barber of Seville by Beaumarchais and several works by Honoré de Balzac, including La Cousine Bette and La Bourse. His works may be seen in the Musée Baron Gérard in Bayeux, the Musée de Picardie in Amiens, and the Musée Carnavalet in Paris, where he served as Curator from 1897 to 1914.

His brother Henri was a famous librettist.

A square in Le Marais, near the Musée Carnavalet, has been named in his honor.

== Selected writings in English ==
- Nooks and Corners of Old Paris, with a preface by Victorien Sardou, translated by Frederick Lawton, E. G. Richards (1907), reprinted by the University of Michigan Library
- Walks in Paris, translated by Alfred Allinson, Macmillan (1909)
- The Byways of Paris, translated by Louise Seymour Houghton, Duffield (1912)
