= Henry Ramsay (civil engineer) =

- Born: May 18, 1808; Guilderland, New York
- Died: July 12, 1886 (aged 78); Schenectady, New York
- Education: The Albany Academy (1926)
- Title: New York State Engineer and Surveyor
- Term: 1853
- Spouse: Isabelle Westervelt (m. 1831–1886)

Henry Ramsay (May 18, 1808, in Guilderland, Albany County, New York – July 12, 1886, in Schenectady, New York) was an American civil engineer and for a short time New York State Engineer and Surveyor in 1853.

== Life ==
He was born on May 18, 1808, the son of Frederick Ramsay and Belle (Quackenbush) Ramsay.

He was educated at the Lancaster School in Albany, and graduated from The Albany Academy in 1826. Afterwards he taught school in Albany, New York. Later he became a draftsman, cartographer and civil engineer. In 1831, he married Isabelle Westervelt, and they had nine children.

In 1842, he was appointed Chief Engineer of the Mohawk and Hudson Railroad between Albany and Schenectady, New York. He laid out the course of the New York Central Railroad at Schenectady, to avoid the inclined plane at that terminus. Subsequently, he became Assistant Engineer on the Erie Canal enlargement. In 1849, he moved to Schenectady, and was for several terms City Surveyor.

On December 10, 1853, he was appointed New York State Engineer and Surveyor, to fill the vacancy caused by the resignation of William J. McAlpine, after Wheeler H. Bristol declined to take office.

He died on July 12, 1886, in Schenectady, New York.

== Legacy ==
He endowed the Henry Ramsay Scholarship at The Albany Academy.

== Sources ==
- The New York Civil List compiled by Franklin Benjamin Hough (pages 37f; Weed, Parsons and Co., 1858)

Political offices
Preceded by William J. McAlpine	New York State Engineer and Surveyor; 1853	Succeeded by John T. Clark
