= Robert Whitaker McAll =

British congregationalist minister (1821–1893)

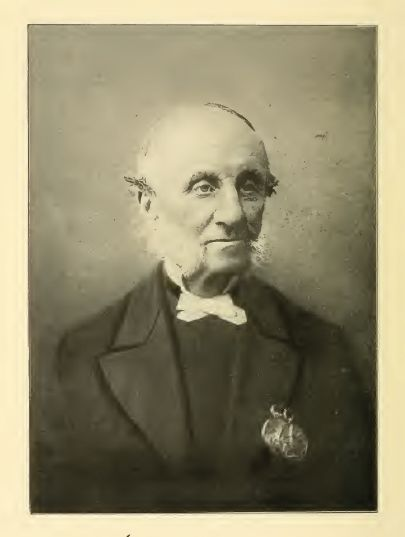
- McAll in his later years
- Born: 17 December 1821; Macclesfield, Cheshire, United Kingdom
- Died: 11 May 1893 (aged 71); Paris, France
- Education: Lancashire Independent College, Whalley Range, Manchester)
- Occupation: Clergyman
- Organization(s): Mission MacAll, Mission aux ouvriers de Paris, Mission populaire évangélique
- Movement: Christian revival
- Spouse: Elizabeth Siddall Hayward
- Parent(s): Robert Stephens McAll; Sarah Whitaker
- Awards: Legion of Honour (1892), medal of the Société nationale d'encouragement au bien (1879); medal of the Société libre d'Instruction et d'Éducation Populaires (1880)

Robert Whitaker McAll (1821–1893) was a congregationalist minister from English and Scottish origin who founded the " Popular Evangelical Mission of France " in Paris in 1872, a movement which gained a considerable following and influence in a few years and which is still in existence today.

== Biography ==
=== Early years ===
Robert Whitaker McAll was son of the minister Robert Stephens McAll and of Sarah Whitaker. He was born on 17 December 1821 in Macclesfield, Cheshire. His father who was a very charismatic pastor in Manchester died in 1838 when Robert McAll was only 17. Passionate about religious architecture Robert McAll started to work in an architect's study in 1839 but after 5 years he turned to Protestant theology, which he studied from 1844 to 1848 in Lancashire Independent College, in Whalley Range College, in Manchester.

=== Church minister in England (1848–1871) ===
Before the end of his studies Robert McAll was called as pastor of the Bethel congregationalist chapel in Sunderland. There, in 1847, he marries Elizabeth Siddall Hayward, only daughter of one of his university professors. He worked ceaselessly for his parish, adding to the usual pastoral activities, youth meetings, open air public preaching and hymn writing – his own hymn book will soon be in use in his parish. His health is shaken by this intense work, and will remain a limitation for him. In 1855, he was counting with some satisfaction that the parish had gained 310 new members during his tenure, in other words one per Sunday... In 1855 he accepted the invitation of the Bond Street nonconformist chapel, in Leicester. His preaching and his action are successful there too. However he resigned after two years to open a new church in Leicester, on London Road. There he imposed his terms: the new parish should be open to people of the neighbourhood and inviting to newcomers, the old habits of pew-rent and fixed contributions should be replaced by voluntary gifts. His intention was to rid the church from widespread prejudices held by the working class. Additional endeavours included launching a mission in the nearby village of Reasby, establishing anti-alcoholic work. During his nine years as a pastor in London Road Chapel, the parish grew from 120 members to 450. In 1866 he moved to Grosvenor Street's parish, in Picadilly, Manchester. In 1867 he intervened publicly to ask for mercy for 3 Fenians who had been condemned to death after their attack on a prisoners transfer vehicle which had left one policeman dead. Robert McAll organised a meeting with the participation of the victim's widow, where she expressed her forgiveness to the murderers of her husband. In spite of his efforts, he didn't succeed in obtaining the commutation of the death penalty of the Irish convicts. Between 1867 and 1871, he was pastor in Birmingham and in Hadleigh in Suffolk. The experience of Robert McAll in his various English parishes was a good preparation for his subsequent ministry in France: he was confronted with the material and moral misery of the working class, he tried various reach out methods including open air preaching, he refined his oratory talent and knew how to convince an audience with a fine mix of charm, humour and conviction.

=== Call to start a Mission for the Workers of Paris ===
In July 1871, Robert McAll was moved by the suffering of the Parisians (due to the long 1870 German siege and to the 1871 Paris Commune's second siege, and he decided to make a trip to Paris. Dutifully armed with French New Testaments and leaflets to distribute, Robert and Elizabeth McAll crossed the Channel on 12 August 1871. They visited different areas in and around Paris: Saint-Ouen, champ de Mars, Versailles, Tuileries, Ménilmontant... On the last day of their visit they were visiting Belleville, trying to meet workers on their way back home after their day of labour. Although they had been formally advised to avoid such supposedly risky neighbourhoods where remains of barricades of the Paris Commune were still to be seen, they kept meeting friendly and open-minded people. The Belleville inhabitants they met even seemed to be grateful for the attention and token of solidarity of these foreign visitors, at a time when so many French didn't even dare to get into this deemed dangerous part of the city. The McAlls soon run out of New Testaments and leaflets. At some point a man who could speak some English came up to them and asked: “Are you a Christian minister? Sir, I have something to tell you. Throughout this whole district, containing tens of thousands of workmen, we cannot accept an imposed religion. But if anyone would come to teach us religion of freedom and reality, many of us are ready for it.” This appeal, which is very often quoted, awoke McAll's missionary calling. On 17 November 1871, Robert McAll and his wife leave the United Kingdom for good, only armed with a hundred pounds, product of the sale of their belongings, and their trunks, which they struggled to retrieve in Paris. They settled in a flat in one of the high points of Paris, rue des Mignottes near Buttes Chaumont! They then got acquainted with the Parisian Protestant leadership, like pastors Georges Fisch, Eugène Bersier or Théodore Monod. On 30 November 1871, after a long and difficult search, they rented a space in Belleville at 103, rue Julien-Lacroix. They managed to buy chairs, harmonium, books, and secure the necessary authorisations. On 17 January 1872 at 7 o'clock in the evening, they open " with trembling hand " the door of their " free library " for an evening during which, according to the invitation, "hymns will be sung and chosen pieces will be read" while "English friends will welcome all equally well". There were finally 40 people at this first evening. But on the Sunday of the same week where Robert McAll delivers his first sermon in French, not without difficulties, the attendance was in excess of 100 people. In March 1872 the McAlls opened a second meeting place in Ménilmontant. After a month there were more than 100 people who attended the services there too. This success led them to open a series of other meeting rooms in Charonne, boulevard Ornano, boulevard Saint-Antoine, rue de la Chapelle, Bercy, Grenelle, Auteuil...

=== Development of the Mission for the Workers of Paris ===
In her memoirs, Mrs Elizabeth McAll examined all ten first yearly reports' covers edited by Robert McAll.

- The first two showed him alone,
- the fifth report showed a team of 6 : McAll as the responsible, two other pastors, Théodore Monod et M. Naef, and three evangelists;
- the sixth year the team had 9 members- and the mission received the medal of the "National Society for the development of Good" (Société nationale d'encouragement au bien).
- the seventh year, one could see two responsible persons: Robert McAll, with a team of 10 people in Paris and pastor Bernard de Watteville in Lyon, and, this time, it was the medal of the Free Society for Popular Instruction and Education (Société libre d'Instruction et d'Éducation Populaires) which was awarded to the work of Reverend McAll.
- the eighth year, the mission had been launched in two other cities: Bordeaux et Boulogne-sur-Mer (in two meeting rooms) and the Paris team was 15 people strong.
- the ninth year, the mission had been launched in Arcachon, la Rochelle, Rochefort and in several places around Paris.
- the tenth year, conferences were organised at the Élysée Montmartre theatre in Paris while the mission was being launched in Roubaix, Croix, Dunkirk, Saint-Étienne, Saintes, Cognac, Clermont-Ferrand, Montauban and Toulouse.

Robert McAll needed help to run this big organisation. The English pastor Dodds came from Britain and helped McAll from 1877 to 1882. From 1882 onwards, the French evangelical pastor Ruben Saillens became the efficient assistant of Robert McAll.

=== The apex of the McAll Mission ===
In 1879, the initial name of Mission for the Workers of Paris (" Mission aux Ouvriers de Paris ") is replaced by the more appropriate Evangelical Popular Mission of France (" Mission populaire évangélique de France "), while in everyday life the unofficial name ever was the "MacAll Mission" (Robert McAll had an "a” added to make his name more legible for French readers). In 1893, when McAll died, the Evangelical Popular Mission of France ran 136 meeting rooms in 57 cities and 37 departments, including Corsica and the then French Algeria and Tunisia, all of this having been built up in only 21 years. In 1892 at the occasion of the 20th anniversary of the mission, Robert McAll, who was 70, had been awarded the highest decoration in France, the Legion of Honour. However he was exhausted and had to retire in England to rest. However he couldn't resist transforming this trip into a fundraising trip, because the finances of the mission were highly unbalanced. He died soon after coming back to France, on 11 May 1893, (on Ascension Day noted Elizabeth McAll in her memoirs.) His funeral was held at the historical Paris Protestant church of Oratoire du Louvre.

== The McAll method ==
=== A missionary project ===
Robert McAll's intentions were clearly missionary. His aim is not to transform society but to bring Parisian workers to God. This also exactly what his former Congregationalist parishioners from Britain were willing to fund and what the French Protestant Revivalists were after. McAll preaching is deeply evangelical, centred on the importance of the Bible, of sin and grace, of faith, sanctification and change of behaviour.

=== A code of conduct to respect the working class ===
With his experience of preaching in British working class areas and having heard the Belleville appeal of 1871 loud and clear, McAll knew he should avoid at all price to criticise the political views of his auditors if he ever wanted to make inroads in the working class and introduce them to Protestant Christianity as a religion of freedom. He therefore set up a stringent code of conduct for all his preachers and evangelists. Here are its main points:

- Never mention nor allude in the slightest way to a political question;
- Never mention bars, wine merchants, theatres, ballrooms or concert halls;
- Never scold people, use « we » instead of « you » as much as possible;
- Never criticise any church; never mention the division of the Christians;
- Never go into a theological question or into a too complex one like the interpretation of prophecies;
- Never refer to God as a vengeful sovereign but as a loving and caring father;
- Avoid bitter or hard language even when referring to sin; eliminate hymn verses containing threatening or vengeful language.

With this code of conduct, McAll steered clear from any sectarian risk. He even prevented the mission from turning into an established church, at least temporarily, since he took no doctrinal position and didn't administer sacraments. He also prevented the McAll Mission's preachers and evangelists to enter into the political field, which allowed him to open the Mission to all, and at the same time to avoid any conflict with the French Police or authorities, who were extremely vigilant on this matter after the tragic revolt of the Commune.

=== A well-oiled machine ===
From its inception the French Mission of Robert McAll was extremely well organised. Each new location is developed in the same way: renting a meeting room, installing a library, intensive leafleting, public meeting with French and English pastors, the ladies looking after the library and the courses. Financing rested mainly upon British funds, raised in McAll former Congregationalist parishes. “In the midst of the moral and cultural apathy which characterised the working class areas in the post Paris Commune years, the McAll meetings brought a fresh opening towards new social relations, a salvation language which fulfilled a need and the seeds of a community. They also brought an access to culture and thus to social advancement…" The accuracy and consistency of statistical data collection is also part of the sense of organisation McAll brought to all his actions. Everything is counted and accounted for: meeting rooms, chairs, meetings, participants, classes, sold or distributed New Testaments, young people in meetings....

=== An essential social and educational action ===
The social and educational dimension of the McAll Mission was extremely important even though it was only one of its secondary aims: a free library was included in each meeting room; as early as February 1872 an open school had been launched, then in 1875 a first workroom for ladies, and in 1881 a free dispensary. The McAll mission organised solidarity collections, soup kitchens, adult literacy courses, English courses, music trainings, etc. Anti-alcoholic campaigns and hygiene development (free showers, free dispensaries, women's meetings), were also paramount. As a result, various movements were born from the McAll mission:

- the Domestic Brush Factory (la Brosserie ménagère), created in Nantes by Emmanuel Chastand
- the Fives-Lille consumers' cooperative, created by pastor Henri Nick with the help of the economist Charles Gide;
- the Rehabilitation School for War-Disabled ('’École des Mutilés'’), founded in Nantes during WWI;
- The Boy Scouts, launched in Grenelle in 1911 after a first experiment in Nantes in 1909;
- Summer camps which will occupy up to 15 properties and 2 preventive sanatoriums, which became the Sun and Health Association (Association Soleil et Santé) en 1931 (and has become completely independent in 1976.)

=== Uneasy finances ===
Mainly financed by gifts from support committees in England and Scotland, and later also in the US and Canada, the McAll mission didn't succeed in establishing financial sustainability. In McAll's lifetime already there had been a few meeting room closures, or they had to be given away to the local Protestant church, which were not always in the capacity to operate them. Financial problems snowballed after McAll's death, which led to a fairly quick decline of the '’Mission populaire évangélique'’.

== Robert McAll's heritage ==
=== The Benefits ===
Robert McAll left an impressive organisation behind him with 136 meeting rooms and a series of important institutions or movements (see supra). But the McAll mission was soon caught up by the growing secularisation of society and a stark reduction of the number of conversions. Moreover, the lingering financial problems led to a quick reduction of the number of meeting rooms: 82 in 1901, about 30 in the 1920s, 11 in 1934. Meanwhile, however "brotherhoods" were created to stabilise the converts; they paved the way for the creation of real new parishes in Lille, Roubaix, Paris and Nantes. The McAll mission left an indelible mark on French Protestantism, to which it brought sizeable working-class audiences. The Evangelical Popular Mission of France went through many ideological and organisational changes since 1945 but carried its action. It claims 16 branches (most of the time on historical sites originally chosen by Robert McAll), as well as a staff of 105 with 10 pastors and over 1000 volunteers. It publishes a quarterly journal, "Présence".

=== Controversy ===
From the onset, critics of the Evangelical Popular Mission of France have pointed out that the mission was preaching social conformity and resignation to the working class under the guise of evangelisation. Robert McAll himself always appeared in public clothed as a wealthy bourgeois: black redingote, golden watch chain, carefully tended side whiskers. The Mission organisation is extremely hierarchical, and a difference will always remain between the "gentlemen of the governing committee" and the converts. These points caused controversy with supporters of the "Christianisme social" (Christian Socialism), another Protestant movement sharing the sensitivity of the Evangelical Popular Mission of France regarding the working class living conditions but harbouring more socialist feelings. There was a major conflict between the Evangelical Popular Mission of France and the liberal pastor of Roubaix Élie Gounelle in 1907.

== Sources ==
- Hayward McAll, Elizabeth Siddall (1896), Robert Whitaker McAll, founder of the McAll mission, London: Fleming H. Revell Company, p. 252.
- Morley, Jean-Paul (1993), 1871–1984, la Mission populaire évangélique: les surprises d'un engagement, Paris: Les Bergers et les Mages, p. 205, ISBN 978-2853041072.
