= Sedgwick family =

Predominantly American family originating in England

The Sedgwick family is a predominantly American family originating in England. Members of the family and their descendants have been influential in politics, law, business, and the arts. The earliest known member of the Sedgwick family to have gone to the New World from England was Robert Sedgwick of Yorkshire, who arrived in 1636 in the Massachusetts Bay Colony, as part of the Great Migration. Sedgwick, Maine, was named in his honor. The Sedgwick Pie is the family's cemetery located in Stockbridge Cemetery, Stockbridge, Massachusetts.

== Family tree ==
=== Ancestors ===
- Major General Robert Sedgwick (1611–1656)
  - William Sedgwick (c. 1643–1674)
    - Samuel Sedgwick, Cpt. (1667–1735)
      - Benjamin Sedgwick, Deacon (1716–1757)
        - Theodore Sedgwick (1746–1813)

=== Main line ===
- Theodore Sedgwick (1746–1813), an American attorney, politician and jurist
  - Elizabeth Mason Sedgwick (1775–1827)
  - A child died at birth on March 27, 1777
  - Frances Pamela Sedgwick (1778–1842)
  - Theodore Sedgwick Jr. (1780–1839), married to Susan Anne Ridley Sedgwick (1788-1867)
    - Theodore Sedgwick III (1811-1859), married to Sarah Morgan Ashburner (1812-1856)
      - Arthur George Sedgwick (1844-1915), married to Lucy Tuckerman (1858-1904)
        - Susan Ridley (Sedgwick) Hammond (1886 - abt. 1981), married to Arthur Wharton Swann (1909), then married to Paul Lyman Hammond (1929)
          - Lilian Swann Saarinen (1912-1995), married to Eero Saarinen (1910-1961)
            - Eric Saarinen (1942-2024)
  - Catherine Sedgwick (1782–1783)
  - Henry Dwight Sedgwick (1784–1785)
  - Henry Dwight Sedgwick I (1785–1831)
    - George Minot Sedgwick (1818-1821)
    - Jane Sedgwick (1821-1889)
    - Frances Sedgwick(1822-unknown)
    - Henry Dwight Sedgwick II (1824–1903)
      - Jane Minot Sedgwick (1859-1918)
      - Henry Dwight Sedgwick III (1861–1957), lawyer and author
        - Henry Dwight "Halla" Sedgwick IV (1896–1914)
        - Robert Minturn "Duke" Sedgwick (1899–1976)
          - May Minturn Sedgwick (born 1926)
          - Henry Dwight Sedgwick V (1928–2018), married to Patricia Ann Rosenwald (1932) and Helen Stern (1930–2019)
            - Holly Sedgwick (born c. 1955)
              - George Nozuka (born 1986)
              - Philip Nozuka (born 1987)
              - Justin Nozuka (born 1988)
            - Kyra Sedgwick (born 1965) actress, producer, and director. Married to Kevin Bacon
              - Sosie Bacon (born 1992), actress
            - Mike Stern (born Michael Sedgwick 1953), jazz guitarist
          - Robert Sedgwick (born 1961)
          - Emily Ames Sedgwick (born 1952)
          - John Shaw Sedgwick (1954–2026), author
        - Edith Minturn Sedgwick (1901–1901)
        - Francis Minturn Sedgwick (1904–1967)
          - Edith Minturn "Edie" Sedgwick (1943–1971), actress who worked with Andy Warhol
      - Theodore Sedgwick (1863–1951)
      - Alexander "Aleck" Sedgwick (1867–1929)
      - Ellery Sedgwick (1872–1960) magazine editor
        - Ellery Sedgwick Jr. (1908–1991)
          - Theodore "Tod" Sedgwick (born 1948), diplomat and publisher
    - Louisa Minot Sedgwick (1826-1841)
  - Robert Sedgwick (1787–1841)
  - Catharine Maria Sedgwick (1789–1867) novelist
  - Charles Sedgwick (1791–1856)

== Connected people ==
- William Ellery
- Elizabeth Freeman, slave freed by Theodore Sedgwick
- Edith Minturn Stokes, sister-in-law of Henry Dwight Sedgwick III
- Dwight family
- Henry deForest, maternal grandfather of Edie Sedgwick
- Ephraim Williams
- Eero Saarinen
- Edmund Bacon (architect)
- Peabody family
