= Theodore Sedgwick =

American attorney and politician (1746–1813)

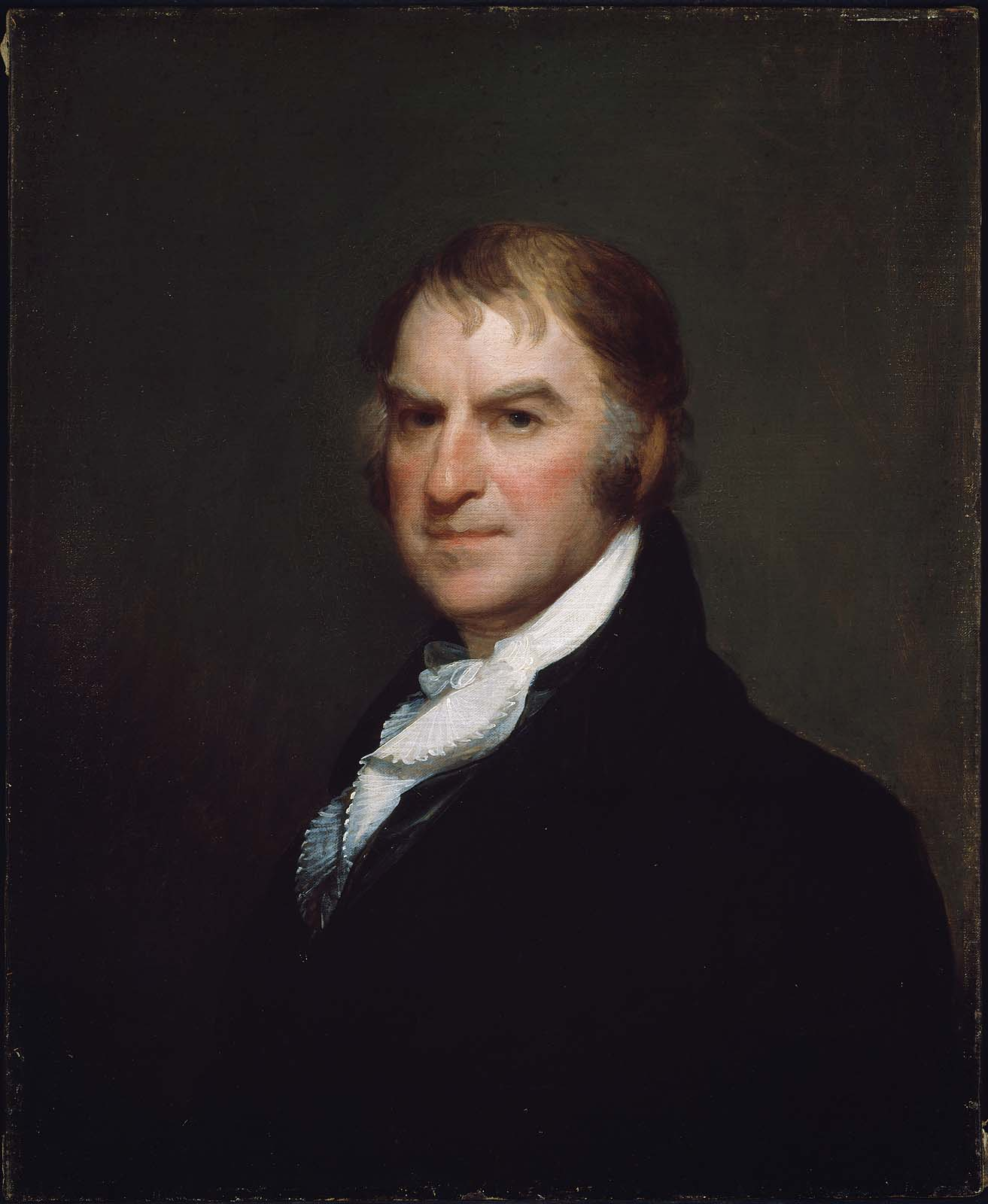
- Portrait by Gilbert Stuart, c. 1808

Associate Justice of the Massachusetts Supreme Judicial Court
- In office 1802 – January 24, 1813
- Preceded by: Thomas Dawes
- Succeeded by: Charles Jackson

4th Speaker of the United States House of Representatives
- In office December 2, 1799 – March 3, 1801
- Preceded by: Jonathan Dayton
- Succeeded by: Nathaniel Macon

President pro tempore of the United States Senate
- In office June 27, 1798 – December 5, 1798
- Preceded by: Jacob Read
- Succeeded by: John Laurance
- In office June 11, 1796 – March 3, 1799
- Preceded by: Caleb Strong
- Succeeded by: Samuel Dexter

Member of the U.S. House of Representatives from Massachusetts
- In office March 4, 1789 – June 11, 1796
- Preceded by: new seat
- Succeeded by: Thomson J. Skinner
- In office March 4, 1799 – March 3, 1801
- Preceded by: Thomson J. Skinner
- Succeeded by: John Bacon
- Constituency: 4th district (1789–93); 2nd district (1793–95); 1st district (1795–96)
- Constituency: 1st district

Member of the Massachusetts Senate
- In office 1784-1785

Speaker of the Massachusetts House of Representatives
- In office 1788-1789

Member of the Massachusetts House of Representatives
- In office 1780
- In office 1782-1783
- In office 1787-1788

Personal details
- Born: May 9, 1746 West Hartford, Connecticut Colony, British America
- Died: January 24, 1813 (aged 66) Boston, Massachusetts, U.S.
- Party: Federalist (1795–1813); Pro-Administration (before 1795)
- Spouses: Elizabeth "Eliza" Mason (m. 1767; died 1771) Pamela Dwight (m. 1774; died 1807) Penelope Russell (m. 1808)
- Children: 10
- Education: Yale College
- Occupation: Attorney, politician, and jurist
- Profession: Law

Military service
- Branch/service: Continental Army
- Rank: Major
- Battles/wars: American Revolutionary War

Theodore Sedgwick (May 9, 1746 – January 24, 1813) was an American attorney, politician, and jurist who served in elected state government and as a delegate to the Continental Congress, a U.S. representative, and a senator from Massachusetts. He served as president pro tempore of the United States Senate from June to December 1798. He also served as the fourth speaker of the United States House of Representatives. He was appointed to the Massachusetts Supreme Judicial Court in 1802 and served there for the rest of his life.

== Early life and education ==
Born in West Hartford in the Connecticut Colony, Sedgwick was the son of Benjamin Sedgwick (1716–1755). His paternal immigrant ancestor Major General Robert Sedgwick arrived in 1636 in the Massachusetts Bay Colony, as part of the Great Migration.

Sedgwick attended Yale College, where he studied theology and law. He did not graduate, but continued in his study of law (to read law) under the attorney Mark Hopkins of Great Barrington. Hopkins was the grandfather of the Mark Hopkins who later became president of Williams College.

== Early career ==
Sedgwick was admitted to the bar in 1766 and commenced practice in Great Barrington, Massachusetts. Among the prospective attorneys who learned the law in his office was Stephen Jacob, who later served on the Vermont Supreme Court. He moved to Sheffield. During the American Revolutionary War, he served in the Continental Army as a major, and took part in the expedition to Canada and the Battle of White Plains in 1776.

== Freedom suit ==
As a relatively young lawyer, Sedgwick and Tapping Reeve pleaded the case of Brom and Bett vs. Ashley (1781), an early "freedom suit", in county court for the slaves Elizabeth Freeman (known as Bett) and Brom. Bett was a black slave who had escaped from her master, Colonel John Ashley of Sheffield, Massachusetts, because of cruel treatment by his wife. Brom joined her in suing for freedom from the Ashleys. The attorneys challenged their enslavement under the new state constitution of 1780, which held that "all men are born free and equal." The jury agreed and ruled that Bett and Brom were free. The decision was upheld on appeal by the state Supreme Court.

Bett marked her freedom by taking the name of Elizabeth Freeman, and she chose to work for wages at the Sedgwick household, where she helped rear their several children. She worked there for much of the rest of her life, buying a separate house for her and her daughter after the Sedgwick children were grown. After Freeman's death, the Sedgwicks buried her at Stockbridge Cemetery in the Sedgwick Pie, the family plot. The family marked Freeman's grave with an inscribed monument, and it is beside that of their fourth child, writer Catharine Maria.

== Political career ==
A Federalist, Sedgwick began his political career in 1780 as a delegate to the Continental Congress. He was elected as representative to the state house, and then as state senator. He was a charter member of the American Academy of Arts and Sciences in 1780.

In 1789 Sedgwick was elected as Representative to Congress from Massachusetts' first congressional district, and also unsuccessfully ran for the U.S. Senate that year. Over time also represented Massachusetts' second district, serving until 1796. That year he was elected to the United States Senate, and served until 1799. In 1799 he was re-elected as a Representative, this time from the fourth district, and was elected the fifth Speaker of the House, serving until March 1801.

In 1802, Sedgwick was appointed a justice of the Supreme Judicial Court of Massachusetts. He held the position until his death.

=== Political relationship with John Adams ===
Sedgwick was nine years younger than John Adams, a 1780 delegate to the Second Continental Congress, attorney and state and federal politician. Sedgwick greatly admired Adams and worked for his election to the presidency in 1796. He was present at Adams' swearing-in as President on March 4, 1797, then serving as a U.S. Senator representing Massachusetts. Sedgwick called Adams' inauguration "the most august and sublime" event that he ever attended. However, certain policy disputes arose during Adams' administration, including Adams' efforts to avoid an escalation of war with France that included sending a group of emissaries to Paris in order to negotiate a lasting peace treaty to end the undeclared Quasi-War between the two countries from 1798 to 1800. When Sedgwick learned of the appointment and mission of the emissaries, "he wrote of the 'vain, jealous, and half frantic mind' of John Adams, a man ruled 'by caprice alone.'"

Despite the differences between them, starting on the morning of March 4, 1801, the last day of Adams' term as President and the day after Sedgwick's retirement as Speaker of the U.S. House, Sedgwick and Adams rode together on the carriage trip from Washington, D.C. to Massachusetts.

== Marriages and family ==
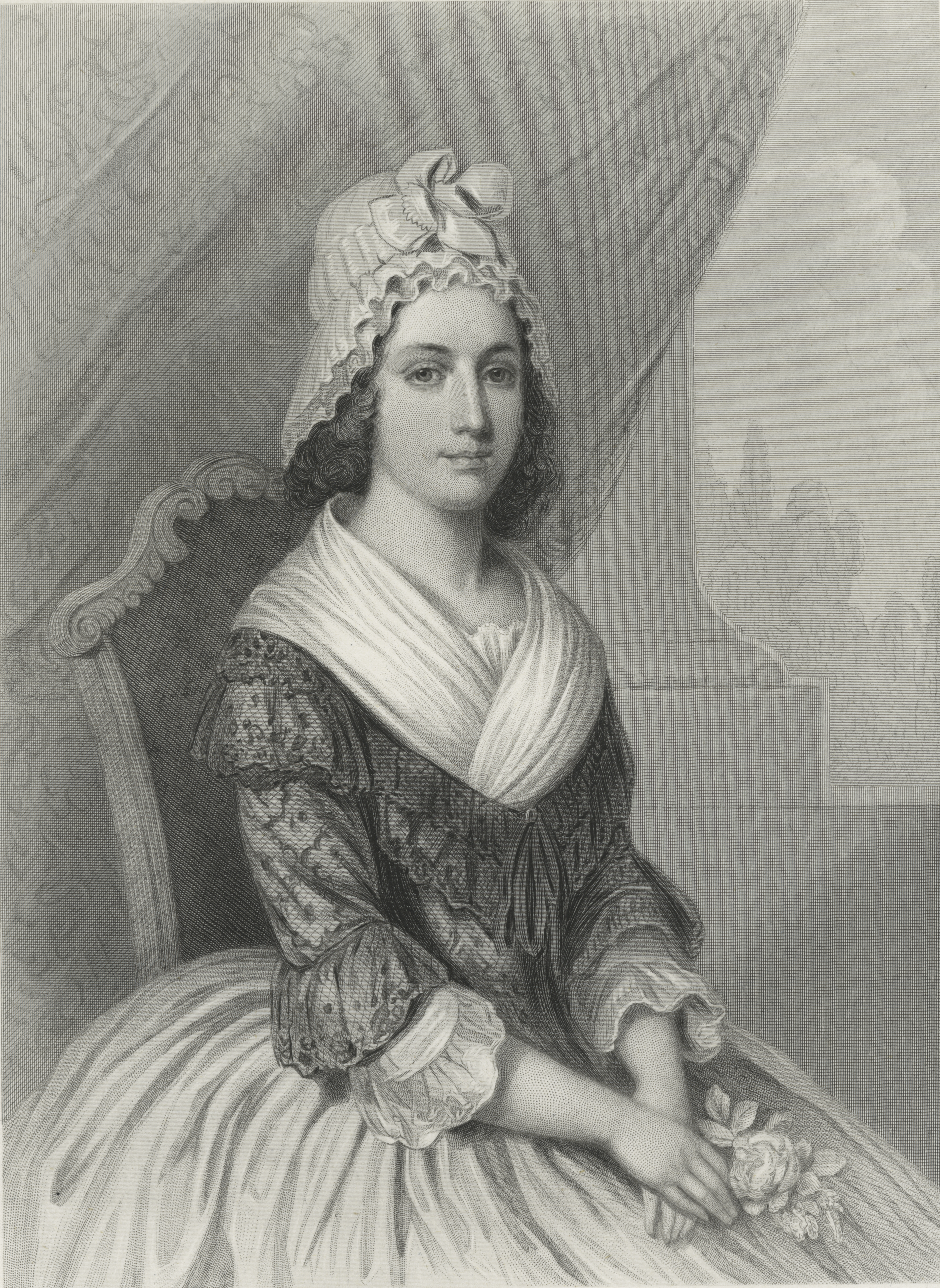
Pamela Dwight Sedgwick

Around 1767, Sedgwick married Elizabeth "Eliza" Mason, the daughter of a deacon from Franklin, Connecticut. In 1771, Sedgwick contracted smallpox which he passed on to his wife who was then pregnant with the couple's first child. She died of the disease on April 12, 1771 while eight months pregnant.

Sedgwick married a second time on April 17, 1774 to Pamela Dwight of the New England Dwight family. She was the daughter of Brigadier General Joseph Dwight of Great Barrington and his second wife, the widow Abigail Williams Sargent. Abigail was the daughter of Colonel Ephraim Williams, and half-sister of Ephraim Williams, Jr., the founder of Williams College.

The Sedgwicks had ten children, three of which died within a year of birth, reflecting the high infant mortality rate of the time. They were:

1. Elizabeth Mason Sedgwick (April 30, 1775 – October 15, 1827)
2. A child died at birth on March 27, 1777.
3. Frances Pamela Sedgwick (May 6, 1778 – June 20, 1842)
4. Theodore Sedgwick II (December 9, 1780 – 1839) married children's book author Susan Anne Livingston. Their son, Theodore Sedgwick, was a lawyer and author.
5. Catherine Sedgwick (July 11, 1782 – March 3, 1783)
6. Henry Dwight Sedgwick (April 18, 1784 – March 1, 1785)
7. Henry Dwight Sedgwick (September 22, 1785 – December 23, 1831), his grandson was a lawyer and an author Henry Dwight Sedgwick III.
8. Robert Sedgwick (June 6, 1787 – September 2, 1841) was a lawyer who married Elizabeth Dana Ellery, granddaughter of William Ellery, a signer of the Declaration of Independence.
9. Catharine Maria Sedgwick (December 28, 1789 – July 31, 1876) became one of the first noted female writers in the United States.
10. Charles Sedgwick (December 15, 1791 – August 3, 1856), became clerk of the Massachusetts Supreme Court. His grandson was anatomist Charles Sedgwick Minot.

During the marriage, Sedgwick frequently left his wife and children at their home in Stockbridge, Massachusetts while he focused on building his political career. His frequent absences, coupled with the death of three children and the strain of caring for numerous children (albeit with the help of her mother and many servants and slaves), caused Pamela's physical and mental health to decline. After Pamela's mother died in February 1791, she developed depression and began exhibiting signs of hypomania. She was institutionalized for a time in December 1795, but her physical and mental health continued to decline in the years following her release. She committed suicide by consuming poison on September 20, 1807.

Approximately eight months after Pamela's death, Sedgwick announced his intention to marry Penelope Russell. Russell was the eldest of ten children (six of whom died) of Dr. Charles and Elizabeth (née Vassall) Russell. Charles Russell was a Harvard University educated doctor who, in 1771, was appointed as registrar to the Vice Admiralty Court. Elizabeth Vassall's father Henry had been a prominent planter in Jamaica and had left his children a sizable inheritance. The Russells and Vassalls were staunch Loyalists who sought asylum in England and Antigua during the Revolutionary War. Sedgwick and Russell met when he represented her uncle, William Vassall, in an equity case he brought against the state of Massachusetts to win back homes and land the state confiscated during the war.

Sedgwick's children were horrified and hurt that their father planned to marry so quickly after the death of their mother, Pamela. They also did not approve of “Miss Russell” whom they considered a spendthrift who was only interested in the Sedgwick fortune. Against his children's wishes, Sedgwick married Russell on November 7, 1808 at King's Chapel in Boston. None of Sedgwick's children were informed of the wedding and did not attend. Theodore Sedgwick and Penelope Russell remained married until Sedgwick's death in January 1813.

== Slave ownership ==
According to research conducted by The Washington Post in 2022 and the Massachusetts Historical Society, Sedgwick owned at least one slave. A July 1, 1777 bill of sale shows General John Fellows sold a woman by the name of Ton to the 30-year old Sedgwick.

== Death ==
While on his death bed, Sedgwick converted to Unitarianism with his daughter Catharine Maria and William Ellery Channing in attendance. On January 24, 1813, Sedgwick died in Boston, Massachusetts at the age of 66. He was buried in Stockbridge, Massachusetts. His grave is at the center of the "Sedgwick Pie".

== Contributing descendants to recent and present eras ==
Theodore Sedgwick was the great-grandfather of Ellery Sedgwick, owner and publisher of the Atlantic Monthly 1908–1938; third great-grandfather of Edie Sedgwick, 1965 superstar in Andy Warhol's celebrity world; is the same to present author John Sedgwick; and is fourth great-grandfather to Kyra Sedgwick and Robert Sedgwick, actors.

== See also ==
- Agrippa Hull
- Liberty's Kids, episode 37

== Notes ==
U.S. House of Representatives
New seat	Member of the U.S. House of Representatives from Massachusetts's 4th congressional district March 4, 1789 – March 3, 1793	Succeeded by Henry Dearborn, George Thatcher, Peleg Wadsworth (General ticket) (Maine District)
Preceded by Benjamin Goodhue	Member of the U.S. House of Representatives from Massachusetts's 2nd congressional district March 4, 1793 – March 3, 1795 alongside: Dwight Foster, William Lyman, Artemas Ward on a General ticket	Succeeded by William Lyman
Preceded by Fisher Ames, Samuel Dexter, Benjamin Goodhue, Samuel Holten (General Ticket)	Member of the U.S. House of Representatives from Massachusetts's 1st congressional district March 4, 1795 – June 1796	Succeeded by Thomson J. Skinner
U.S. Senate
Preceded by Caleb Strong	U.S. senator (Class 2) from Massachusetts; June 11, 1796 – March 3, 1799; Served alongside: Benjamin Goodhue	Succeeded by Samuel Dexter
Preceded by Jacob Read	President pro tempore of the United States Senate; June 27, 1798 – December 5, 1798	Succeeded by John Laurance
U.S. House of Representatives
Preceded by Thomson J. Skinner	Member of the U.S. House of Representatives from Massachusetts's 1st congressional district March 4, 1799 – March 3, 1801	Succeeded by John Bacon
Preceded by Jonathan Dayton	Speaker of the U.S. House of Representatives; December 2, 1799 – March 3, 1801	Succeeded by Nathaniel Macon
Legal offices
Preceded by Thomas Dawes	Associate Justice of the Massachusetts Supreme Judicial Court; 1802–1813	Succeeded by Charles Jackson
