= Dwight family =

A family in New England

The Dwight family of New England had many members who were military leaders, educators, jurists, authors, businessmen and clergy.

Around 1634, John Dwight came with his wife Hannah (1604-1656), daughter Hannah (1625-1714), and sons Timothy (1629–1718) and John (bef Jul 1629-1638) from Dedham, Essex, England, to Dedham, Massachusetts. John and Hannah Dwight had two more daughters before John Dwight died in 1660. Mary (born at sea (1635-1713) and Sarah (1638-1663). The known descendants of John and Hannah Dwight are from their two grandsons (children of Timothy and his third wife Anna Flint): Justice Nathaniel Dwight (1666–1711) and Captain Henry Dwight (1676–1732).

== Nathaniel Dwight ==
Justice Nathaniel Dwight (1666–1711) married Mehitable Partridge (1675–1756) (Note: Mehitable Partridge was a daughter of Samuel and Mehitable Crow Partridge (c.1652-1730). Mehitable Crow Partridge was a daughter of John and Elizabeth Goodwin Crow. Elizabeth Goodwin Crow was a daughter of Elder William (b.c. 1591-1673) and Elizabeth White Goodwin. William was remarried to Susanna Harkes Garbrand Goodwin (1593-1676). He died in Farmington, Hartford County, Connecticut. (William and Elizabeth White were ancestors of Dr. Benjamin Franklin Goodrich, founder of the Goodrich Tire Company. Dr. Goodrich was a brother-in-law of Gen. Selden Erastus Marvin, a nephew of Judge William Marvin, who resided in Key West, Florida. Marvin became the seventh Governor of Florida.) Susanna had first married Rev. Thomas Hooker ll. Their son-in-law was Rev. John Wilson Jr., who married her daughter Sarah Wilson. Sarah Hooker Wilson was born in Little Baddow, Essex County, England, around 1629. Sarah Hooker Wilson was an ancestor of President William H. Taft. She died in Braintree, Massachusetts on August 20, 1725. Rev. John Wilson was a colleague of Rev. Richard Mather. Rev. John Wilson Jr. was born in London, England and came to New England in 1630. He graduated from Harvard College in 1642, the first graduating class, along with Rev. John Woodbridge.) in 1693. Their descendants were:

- Colonel Timothy Dwight II (1694–1771), lawyer married Experience King (1693–1763)
  - Eleanor Dwight (1717-1777)
  - Major Timothy Dwight III (1726–1777), married Mary Edwards (1734–1807), daughter of theologian Jonathan Edwards (1703–1758)
    - Timothy Dwight IV (1752–1817), president of Yale College 1795–1817, married Margaret (or Mary) Woolsey (1754–1777)
      - Timothy Dwight (1778-1844)
      - Benjamin Woolsey Dwight (1780–1850), physician married Sophia Woodbridge Strong (1793–1861).
        - Benjamin Woodbridge Dwight (1816–1889), educator and author
          - Eliza Dewey Dwight (b. 1850)
          - Sophia Edwards Dwight (b. 1853)
          - Francis Edwin Dwight (b. 1856)
          - Issabella Jane Dwight (b. 1861)
          - Bertha Woolsey Dwight (b. 1867)
        - Sophia Dwight (1818-1863)
        - Theodore William Dwight (1822–1892), lawyer
        - Mary Dwight (1824-1864)
        - Edward W. Dwight (1827–1904), member of the Wisconsin State Assembly
        - Elizabeth Dwight (1831-1870)
      - James Dwight III (1784–1863), married Aurelia Darling (1787-1813) in 1811 and Susan Breed (1785–1851) in 1815
        - Elizabeth Smith Dwight (1812-1848)
        - Aurelia Dwight (1816-1874)
        - Timothy Dwight (1820-1822)
        - John Breed Dwight (1822-1843)
        - James McLaren Breed Dwight (1825-1897)
        - Timothy Dwight V (1828–1916), president of Yale University 1886–1898
          - Helen Rood Dwight (1868-1909)
          - Winthrop Edwards Dwight (1872-1944)
      - John Dwight (1784-1803)
      - Sereno Edwards Dwight (1786–1850), author and minister, married Susan Edwards Daggett, daughter of David Daggett (1764–1851), founder of the Yale College Law School. David Daggett was a descendant of Hannah Mayhew Daggett, daughter of Gov. Thomas Mayhew of Martha's Vineyard.
        - Their only daughter did not survive infancy.
      - William Theodore Dwight (1795–1865), clergyman
        - Henry Edwin Dwight (1832-1908)
        - Elizabeth Bradford Dwight (1835-1904)
        - Laura Leman Dwight (1836-1928)
        - Thomas Bradford Dwight (1837-1878)
        - William Theodore Dwight (1844-1848)
      - Henry Edwin Dwight (1797-1832)
      - a son who died young
    - Edwards Dwight (1754-1783)
    - Erastus Dwight (1756-1821)
    - Jonathan Edwards Dwight (1759-1800)
    - Sarah Dwight (1761-1805)
    - Mary Dwight (1763-1813)
    - Theodore Dwight (1764–1846), journalist, married Abigail Alsop (1765–1846), the sister of Richard Alsop (1761–1815)
      - Mary A Dwight (1793-1875)
      - Theodore Dwight (1796–1866), author, married Eleanor Boyd.
      - William Richard Dwight (1798-1864)
    - Maurice William Dwight (1766-1796)
    - Fidelia Dwight (1768-1847)
    - Nathaniel Dwight (1770-1831)
    - Elizabeth Dwight (1772–1813) married William Walton Woolsey (1766–1839)
      - Mary Anne Woolsey (1793–1871) married Jared Scarborough (1781-1816) and then George Hoadley (1781–1857)
        - William Woolsey Scarborough (1814-1896)
        - Elizabeth Dwight Scarborough (1815-1816)
        - Joseph Scarborough (1817-1817)
        - Elizabeth Dwight Hoadley married General Joshua Hall Bates (1817–1908)
        - George Hoadly (1826–1902), governor of Ohio
          - George Hoadley earned degrees at Harvard University
          - Edward M. Hoadley graduated from Rensselaer Polytechnic Institute
          - Laura Hoadley married a second cousin, Theodore Woolsey Scarborough
        - Laura J Hoadley (1835-1853)
      - Elizabeth Woolsey (1794-1863)
      - William Cecil Woolsey (1796-1840)
      - John Mumford Woolsey (1796–1870) married Jane Andrews
        - Sarah Chauncey Woolsey (1835–1905), author published What Katy Did as "Susan Coolidge"
        - Jane Andrews Woolsey (b. 1836)
        - Elisabeth Dwight Woolsey (1838–1910) married Daniel Coit Gilman
        - Theodora Walton Woolsey (1840-1910)
        - William Walton Woolsey (1842–1910), plantation owner, married Catherine Buckingham Convers, daughter of Charles Cleveland Convers, and then Bessie Gammell
          - Clara Constance Woolsey (1872-1872)
          - John Munro Woolsey (1877-1945)
          - Convers Buckingham Woolsey (1880-1951)
          - Catherine Buckingham Woolsey (1882-1975)
          - William Walton Woolsey (1886-1964)
          - Gamel Woolsey (1895–1968), author, married Gerald Brenan
      - Theodore Dwight Woolsey (1801–1889), president of Yale 1846–1871, married Elizabeth Salisbury in 1833 and then Sarah Pritchard in 1854.
        - Edward Salisbury Woolsey (1834-1843) died of scarlet fever
        - Elizabeth Woolsey (1835-1843) died of scarlet fever
        - Agnes Woolsey (1838-1915)
        - William Walton Woolsey (1840-1843) died of scarlet fever
        - Laura Woolsey (1842-1861) died of typhoid fever
        - Catherine Woolsey (1845-1854)
        - Martha Woolsey (1847-1870)
        - Helen Woolsey (1849-1870)
        - Theodore Salisbury Woolsey (1852–1929), legal scholar
          - Theodore Salisbury Woolsey, Jr. (1880–1933), forestry professor
            - Elizabeth Davenport Woolsey (1908-1997)
            - Anne Salisbury Woolsey (1910-2005)
            - Edith Woolsey (1912-2005)
            - Sarah Woolsey (1913-2003)
            - Patricia Woolsey (1917-2004)
          - Heathcote Muirson Woolsey (1884-1957)
        - Mary Prichard Woolsey (1855-1931)
        - John Muirson Woolsey (1858-1861) died of typhoid fever
        - George Woolsey (1861-1950)
        - Edith Woolsey (1864-1960)
      - Sara Dwight Woolsey (1805-1870)
      - Theodosia Woolsey (1810-1811)
    - Cecil Dwight (1774-1839)
    - Henry Edwin Dwight (1776-1824)

- Abiah Dwight (1704–1748), married Samuel Kent
  - Elijah Kent (1722-1768)
  - Abiah Kent (1727–1782), married John Leavitt (1724–1798), Esq., brother of Jemima (Leavitt) Ellsworth
    - Joshua Leavitt (1746-1752)
    - John Leavitt (1748-1752)
    - Thaddeus Leavitt (1750–1826), merchant, Suffield, Connecticut, married Elizabeth King
      - Thaddeus Leavitt Jr. (1778–1828), married Jemima Loomis (1779–1846)
        - Jane Maria Leavitt (1801–1877) married Jonathan Hunt Jr. (1787–1832)
          - William Morris Hunt (1824–1879), painter, married Louisa Dumerique Perkins of Boston
          - Jonathan Hunt, M.D., (1826–1874) physician in Paris, France
          - Richard Morris Hunt (1827–1895), architect, married Catherine Clinton Howland (1841–1880), sister of Joseph Howland
          - Colonel Leavitt Hunt (1831–1907), pioneer photographer, attorney, inventor, farmer, married Katherine Jarvis
            - Jarvis Hunt (1863–1941), architect, Chicago, Illinois
      - Elizabeth Leavitt (1788-1865)
      - John George Leavitt (1808-1859)
    - Thaddeus Leavitt (1750-1813)
    - Captain John Leavitt (1755–1815), co-founder, Leavittsburg, Ohio, farmer, innkeeper
      - Humphrey H. Leavitt (1796–1873), Ohio politician, United States District Court judge
        - John McDowell Leavitt (1824–1909), Episcopal clergyman, university president
          - John Brooks Leavitt (1849–1930), New York City attorney, author and civic reformer
  - Anna Kent (1730-1807)
  - Elihu Kent (1733-1814)
  - Mehitable Kent (1734-1735)
    - Amelia Leavitt (1757-1809)
    - Freegrace Leavitt (1764-1843)
    - Jemima Leavitt (1764-1818)
    - Dorothy Leavitt (1768-1844)
    - Charlotte Leavitt (1769-1863)

- Mehitable Dwight (1705–1767), married Captain Abraham Burbank (1703–1767), large landholder, residing at Suffield, Connecticut.
  - Abraham Burbank, Esq. (1739–1808), lawyer, Yale 1759, Massachusetts Legislature from 1779 to 1808; delegate to Constitutional Convention, 1780; Justice of the Peace in June 1772 and a commissary during the Revolutionary War; married (1) Bethia Cushing (1740–1768) (2) Sarah Pomeroy (1744–1808), daughter of General Seth Pomeroy.
    - Arthur Burbank (1782–1839) farmer, married Sarah Bates (1789–1870), daughter of Revolutionary War Soldier Eleazer Bates (1749–1826)
      - Abraham Burbank (1813–1887), largest real estate owner in Pittsfield, Mass.; builder, hardware store owner, hotel operator, married Julia M. Brown (1812–1897)

Nathaniel Dwight (1712—1784), Jr., a surveyor, militia captain in the Crown Point Expedition during the French and Indian War and among the founders of Cold Spring (Belchertown), Massachusetts, married Hannah Mary Lyman (1708-1792) at Cold Spring on January 2, 1734.

== Henry Dwight ==
Captain Henry Dwight (1676–1732), farmer, merchant and judge, married Lydia Hawley (1680–1748). Their descendants were:

- Brig. General Joseph Dwight (1703–1765), judge in Great Barrington, Massachusetts, married Mary Pynchon, and then Abigail (Williams) Sargeant (1721–1791), half-sister to Ephraim Williams Jr.
  - Lydia Dwight (1732-1798) married Rev. Dr. John Willard (1733-1807), brother of Joseph Willard, former president of Harvard College. Rev.Dr. John Willard was a mentor of Rev. Abishai Alden and a descendant of Major Simon Willard. See Endicott Rock history.
  - Joseph Dwight, Jr. (1737–1826) married Lydia Dewey (1745–1811)
    - Solomon Dwight (1769–1813) married Veina Foster
      - Elijah Dwight (1797–1868) married Olive Standish (1795–1874), descended from Myles Standish
        - Jeremiah W. Dwight (1819–1885), New York State politician
          - John Wilbur Dwight (1859–1928), New York State politician
  - Pamela Dwight (1753*–1807), married Judge Theodore Sedgwick (1746–1813)
    - Theodore Sedgwick (1780–1839), lawyer and diplomat, married Susan Anne Livingson (1788–1867)
      - Theodore Sedgwick (1811–1859), lawyer and author
    - Henry Dwight Sedgwick (1785–1831), anti-slavery lawyer, married Jane Minot (1795–1859)
      - Henry Dwight Sedgwick II (1824–1903), married Henrietta Ellery Sedgwick (1829–1899)
    - Catharine Sedgwick (1789–1867), novelist
    - Charles Sedgwick (1791–1856), clerk of Massachusetts Supreme Court, married Elizabeth Buckminster Dwight (1801–1864)
      - Catharine Maria Sedgwick (1820–1880) married William Minot II (1817–1894)
        - Charles Sedgwick Minot (1852–1914), anatomist
  - Henry Williams Dwight (1757–1804), married Abigail Welles (1763–1840), descended from Thomas Welles
    - Henry Williams Dwight (1788–1845), lawyer and politician
    - Edwin Welles Dwight (1789–1841), author and minister
- Captain Seth Dwight (1707–1774), farmer, married Abigail Strong (1710–1780)
  - Ensign Josiah Dwight (1747–1796) married Tabitha Bigelow (c. 1740–1796)
    - Seth Dwight (1769–1825), merchant, married Hannah Strong (1768–1813)
      - Harriet Dwight (1792–1870) married James Dana
        - James Dwight Dana (1813–1895), geologist, married Henrietta Frances Silliman (1823–1907), daughter of chemist Benjamin Silliman (1779–1864)
          - Edward Salisbury Dana (1849–1935), mineralogist
      - Harrison Gray Otis Dwight (1803–1862), missionary to Turkey, married Mary Lane (1811–1860)
        - Henry Otis Dwight (1843–1917), missionary to Turkey, married Mary A. Bliss
        - Sarah Hinsdale Dwight, missionary married Edward Riggs, the son on Elias Riggs (1810–1901)
    - Josiah Dwight Jr. (1772–1826) married Sarah Hartwell (1772–1822)
      - Morris Dwight, M.D. (1796–?) married Minerva Bryant (1800–?)
        - Colonel Augustus Wade Dwight (1827–1865) died in American Civil War
- Colonel Josiah Dwight (1715–1768), merchant and judge, married Elizabeth Buckminster (1731–1798)
  - Thomas Dwight (1758–1819), politician, married Hannah Worthington (1761–1833)
  - Clarissa Dwight (1762–1820) married Major Abel Whitney (1756–1807)
    - Josiah Dwight Whitney (1786–1869), merchant, married Sarah Williston (1800–1833)
      - Josiah Dwight Whitney (1819–1896), geologist
      - William Dwight Whitney (1827–1894), linguist, married Elizabeth Wooster Baldwin, daughter of Roger Sherman Baldwin
        - Edward Baldwin Whitney (1857–1911), judge, married A. Josepha Newcomb, daughter of Simon Newcomb
          - Hassler Whitney (1907–1989) mathematician
  - Josiah Dwight, Jr. (1767–1821), merchant, married Rhoda Edwards (1778–1864), granddaughter of Jonathan Edwards
    - Elizabeth Buckminster Dwight (1801–1864) married distant cousin Charles Sedgwick (1791–1856), see above
- Edmund Dwight (1717–1755) married Elizabeth Scutt (1724–1764)
  - Jonathan Dwight (1743–1831) married Margaret Ashley (1745–1789)
    - Jonathan Dwight Jr. (1772–1840), merchant and politician, married Sarah Shepard (1774–1805)
      - Jonathan Dwight, third (1799–1856), merchant, married Ann Bartlett
        - Jonathan Dwight fourth (1831–1910), civil engineer, married Julia Lawrence Hasbrouck
          - Jonathan Dwight fifth (1858–1929), ornithologist
      - William Dwight (1805–?) married Elizabeth Amelia White
        - General William Dwight, Jr. (1831–1888), in American Civil War
      - Thomas Dwight (1807–?) married Mary Collins Warren, daughter of John Collins Warren
        - Thomas Dwight (1843–1911), physician, anatomy author and teacher
    - Edmund Dwight (1780–1849), merchant and philanthropist, married Mary Harrison Eliot

== See also ==
- Sedgwick family
- Whitney family
- Leavitt family
- Hunt family
