= Jeremiah W. Dwight =

American politician (1819–1885)

Jeremiah Wilbur Dwight
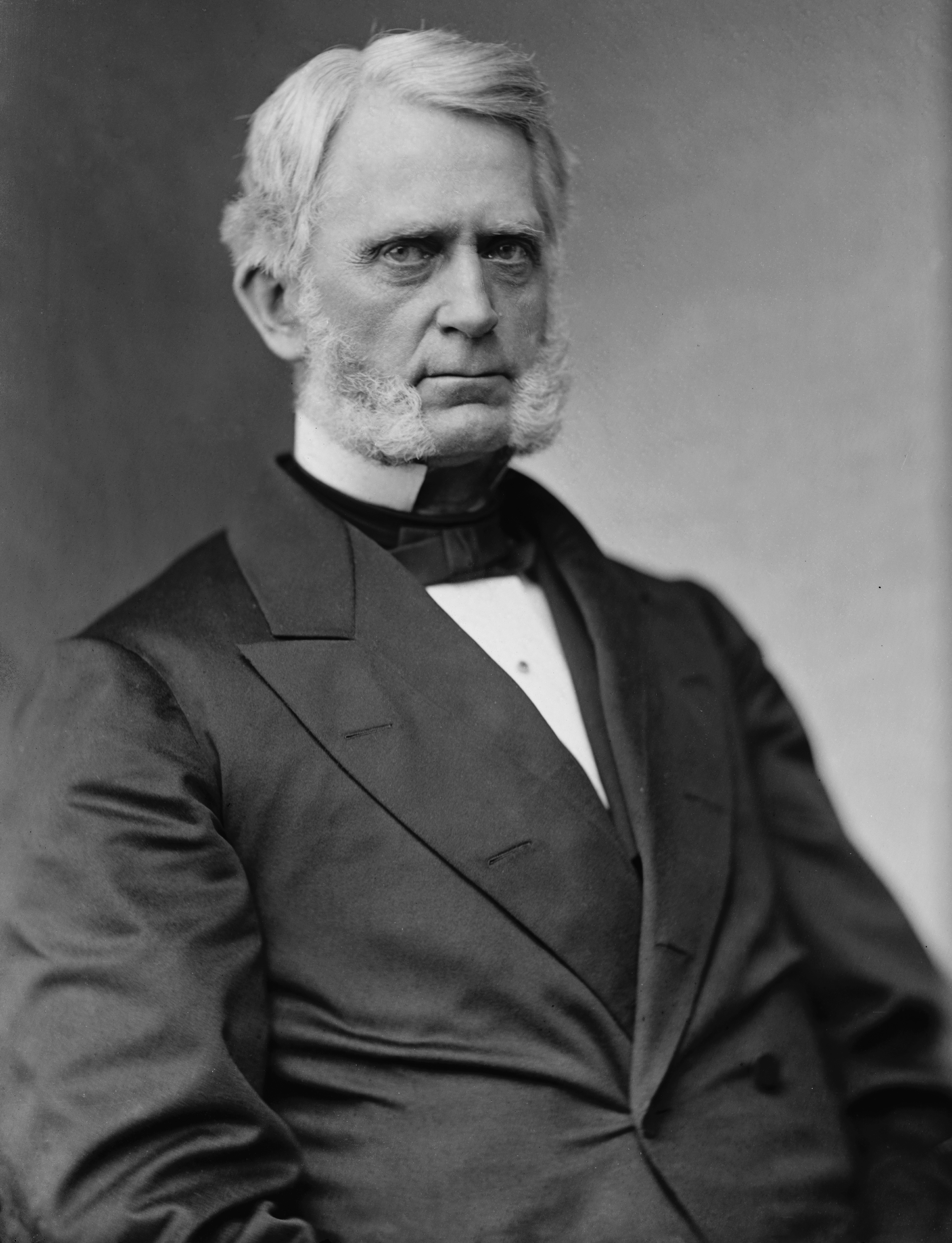
- Born: April 17, 1819; Cincinnatus, New York
- Died: November 26, 1885 (aged 66)

Jeremiah Wilbur Dwight (April 17, 1819 – November 26, 1885) was a U.S. representative from New York, father of John Wilbur Dwight.

== Life ==
Born April 17, 1819 in Cincinnatus, New York, his father was Elijah Dwight (1797–1868) and mother was Olive Standish (1795–1874), descended from Myles Standish. His paternal great-grandfather was Joseph Dwight (1703–1765), making him part of the large New England Dwight family. Dwight moved with his parents in 1830 to Caroline, and in 1836 to Dryden, New York. He attended the district schools and the Burhan's School in Dryden. He engaged in mercantile pursuits, farming, real-estate business, and in the manufacture and sale of lumber. He served as chairman of the board of supervisors of the town of Dryden in 1857 and 1858. He was a member of the New York State Assembly (Tompkins Co.) in 1860 and 1861. He was appointed by Governor Morgan a member of the senatorial district war committee in 1861. He served as delegate to the Republican National Conventions in 1868, 1872, 1876, 1880, and 1884. He served as director, member of the executive committee, and vice president of the Southern Central Railroad for many years.

Dwight was elected as a Republican to the Forty-fifth, Forty-sixth, and Forty-seventh Congresses (March 4, 1877 – March 3, 1883). He declined to be a candidate for renomination in 1882, and resumed his former business activities. He died in Dryden, New York, November 26, 1885. He was interred in Green Hills Cemetery.

New York State Assembly
| Preceded by William Woodbury | New York State Assembly; Tompkins County; 1860–1861 | Succeeded by Ezra Cornell |
U.S. House of Representatives
| Preceded by Thomas C. Platt | Member of the U.S. House of Representatives from New York's 28th congressional district 1877–1883 | Succeeded by Stephen C. Millard |
