= Theodore Sedgwick (writer) =

American legal writer

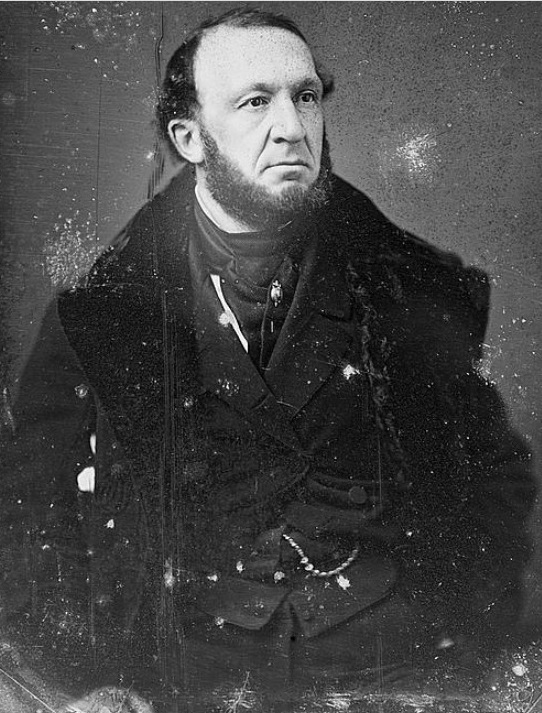
- Mathew Brady photo, circa 1858

United States Attorney for the Southern District of New York
- In office January 1858 – December 1859
- Preceded by: John McKeon
- Succeeded by: James I. Roosevelt

Personal details
- Born: January 27, 1811 Albany, New York, U.S.
- Died: December 9, 1859 (aged 48) Stockbridge, Massachusetts, U.S.
- Resting place: Stockbridge Cemetery, Stockbridge, Massachusetts, U.S.
- Party: Democratic
- Spouse: Sarah Morgan Ashburner (m. 1835–1859, his death)
- Relations: Theodore Sedgwick (1746-1813) (grandfather); Catharine Sedgwick (aunt)
- Children: 7
- Parent(s): Theodore Sedgwick (1780–1839); Susan Anne Ridley Sedgwick
- Education: Columbia College
- Occupation: Attorney; Writer

Theodore Sedgwick III (January 27, 1811 – December 9, 1859) was an American attorney and writer on legal topics.

He was born in Albany, New York, the son of Theodore Sedgwick II (1780–1839) and Susan Anne Ridley Sedgwick (1788–1867). He was a grandson of Theodore Sedgwick (1746–1813).

He graduated from Columbia College in 1829 where he was a member of the Philolexian Society. He then studied law and was admitted to the bar in May 1833.

Sedgwick spent 15 months in Europe, primarily as a member of Edward Livingston's legation when Livingston served as U.S. Minister to France. On his return home in May 1835, he joined his uncle Robert Sedgwick's law practice in New York. He took over the practice when Robert was debilitated by a stroke in 1838, and remained active until 1850.

Ill health forced Sedgwick to retire in 1850. He spent the next several years traveling in Europe, including visits to Italy, Switzerland, France, and England. In 1852, he became president of the Crystal Palace Association, organizing the construction of the building for the New York World's Fair.

In 1857, Sedgwick declined President James Buchanan's offers to become Minister to the Netherlands and assistant secretary of state. In 1858, he became United States Attorney for the Southern District of New York.

Sedgwick died in Stockbridge on December 9, 1859. He was buried at Stockbridge Cemetery.

His writings include his edition of the political writings of William Leggett (two volumes, 1840); Treatise on the Measure of Damages (1847; eighth edition, 1891); Treatise on the Rules which Govern the Interpretation and Application of Statutory and Constitutional Law (1857; second edition, 1874); and Thoughts on the Proposed Annexation of Texas (1844, originally published 1843 as letters to the New York Evening Post), which declared the annexation of Texas unconstitutional.

Legal offices
Preceded by John McKeon	United States Attorney for the Southern District of New York; January 1858–December 1859	Succeeded by James I. Roosevelt
