= Henry Dwight Sedgwick =

American author (1861–1957)

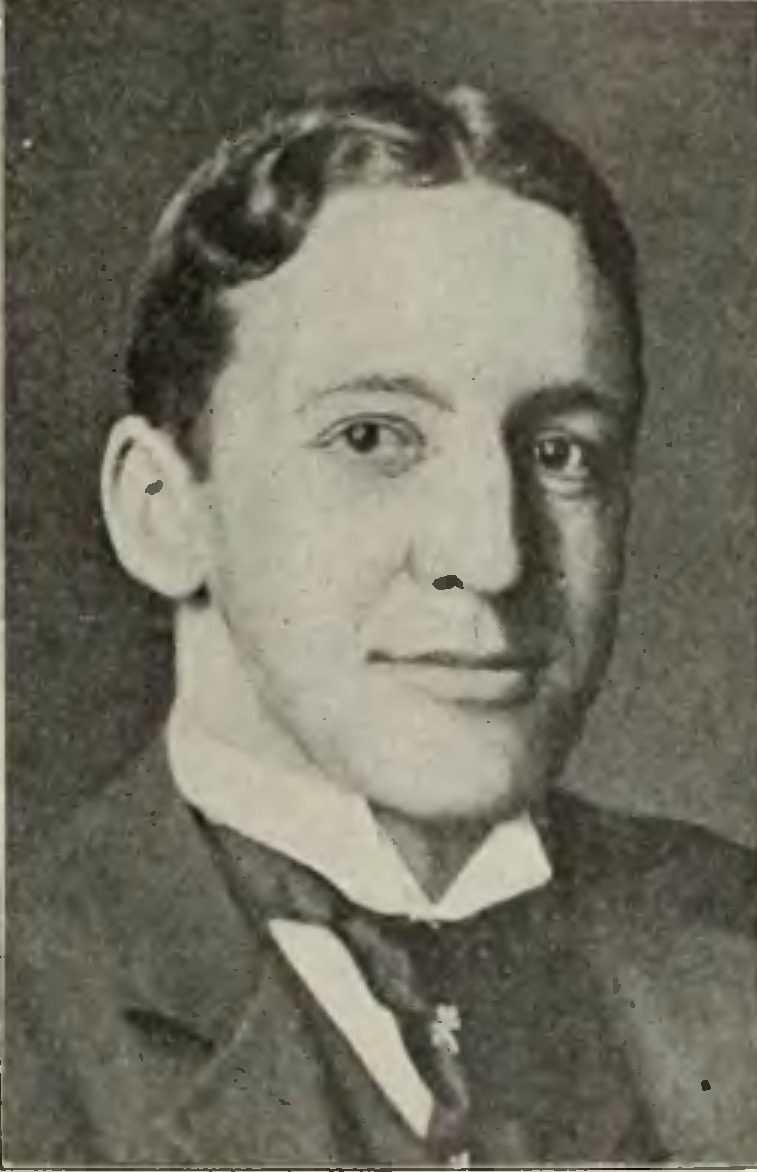
- Born: Henry Dwight Sedgwick III; September 24, 1861; Stockbridge, Massachusetts, U.S.
- Died: January 5, 1957 (aged 95); Pittsfield, Massachusetts, U.S.
- Resting place: Stockbridge Cemetery (Sedgwick Pie)
- Education: Harvard University; Harvard Law School
- Occupations: Lawyer, author
- Spouses: Sarah Minturn (m. 1895; died 1919) Gabriella May Ladd (m. 1953)
- Children: 4
- Relatives: Theodore Sedgwick (paternal great-grandfather); Ellery Sedgwick (brother); Edie Sedgwick (granddaughter); Kyra Sedgwick (great-granddaughter)

Henry Dwight Sedgwick III (September 24, 1861 – January 5, 1957) was an American lawyer and author. He was a member of the prominent Sedgwick family of New England and New York.

== Early life ==
Sedgwick was born in Stockbridge, Massachusetts, the second of five children born to Henry Dwight Sedgwick II (1824–1903) and Henrietta Ellery Sedgwick (1829–1899). On his paternal grandmother's side, he was part of the New England Dwight family. His paternal great-grandfather was Theodore Sedgwick. He had an older sister, Jane Minot (1859-1918), and three younger brothers, Theodore (1863–1951), Alexander "Aleck" (1867–1929) and Ellery Sedgwick.

Sedgwick graduated from Harvard University in 1882, and studied law in Boston until 1884 when he was admitted to the bar.

== Career ==
Sedgwick practiced law in New York City from 1885 to 1898. He later became an author and wrote several historical biographies on Isaac Thomas Hecker, Henry of Navarre, Alfred de Musset, and Marcus Aurelius.

He was elected to the National Institute of Arts and Letters, and was elected in 1893 as a member of the American Academy of Arts and Letters, whose members were chosen from the National Institute; they have since become one entity. He also was a member of the American Academy of Arts and Sciences (Boston) and the Massachusetts Historical Society.

== Personal life ==
=== Marriages and children ===
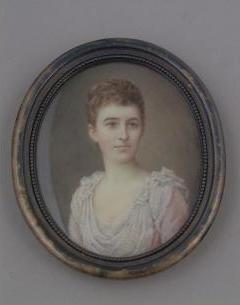
Sarah May Minturn

On November 8, 1895, Sedgwick married Sarah May Minturn, daughter of Robert Bowne Minturn, Jr. (part owner of the Flying Cloud clipper ship) and Susanna (née Shaw) Minturn (Susanna was the sister of Colonel Robert Gould Shaw) at St. George's Protestant Episcopal Church in New York City. The couple had four children:

- Henry Dwight "Halla" IV (1896–1914)
- Edith Minturn (1901–1901)
- Robert Minturn "Duke" (1899–1976)
- Francis Minturn Sedgwick (1904–1967)

Their only daughter, Edith, died the day after her birth. Their eldest son Henry IV (known as Halla) died of pneumonia at the age of 17. Sarah May Minturn died of a stroke in 1919. Robert Minturn Sedgwick was a Harvard Crimson football athlete, as was his father, who started at left tackle for two teams—1919 and 1920—that defeated Yale, the 1919 team named national champions. The elder Sedgwick lettered in the 1878 season; his son Robert, at left tackle, lettered in the 1919 and 1920 seasons.

On May 18, 1953, Sedgwick married Gabriella May Ladd in Newtown Township, Pennsylvania. She was the daughter of Dr. Maynard Ladd and sculptor Anna Coleman Ladd. Ladd, who was 46 years Sedgwick's junior, had never been married nor did she remarry after Sedgwick's death.

=== Relatives and friends ===
Sedgwick's granddaughter was Edith Minturn "Edie" Sedgwick, the daughter of his youngest son Francis and his wife Alice Delano de Forest. Alice was the daughter of Henry deForest. During the 1960s, Edie Sedgwick starred in many of Andy Warhol's short films.

He is also a paternal great-grandfather to actress Kyra Sedgwick, whose father is Henry Dwight Sedgwick V. Henry V is the son of Sedgwick's second oldest son Robert and his first wife Helen Peabody (1890–1948), daughter of Endicott Peabody.

Sedgwick was a friend to Leavitt Hunt, son of Vermont Congressman Jonathan Hunt (Vermont Representative) and, like Sedgwick, also a Harvard Law School-educated New York attorney. Hunt was also a photographer and brother of Boston painter William Morris Hunt and architect Richard Morris Hunt. Sedgwick and Leavitt Hunt frequently corresponded.

=== Death ===
On January 5, 1957, Sedgwick died at Pittsfield General Hospital in Pittsfield, Massachusetts at the age of 95. His funeral was held on January 8 at St. Paul's Episcopal Church in Boston.

Sedgwick and his first wife, Sarah Minturn Sedgwick, are buried in the Sedgwick Pie in Stockbridge Cemetery, Stockbridge, Massachusetts. His second wife, Gabriella, was also buried in the Pie upon her death in 1972.

== Selected publications ==
- The Letters of Captain Cuellar (1896)
- The Life of Father Hecker (1897)
- The Life of Samuel Champlain (1901)
- Essays on Great Writers (1902)
- The Life of Francis Parkman, in the "American Men of Letters Series" (1904)
- A Short History of Italy (1905)
- The New American Type and Other Essays (1908)
- Italy in the Thirteenth Century (1912)
- An Apology for Old Maids, and other Essays (1916)
- Marcus Aurelius: A Biography told as may by Letters, together with some Account of the Stoic Religion... (1921)
- Ignatius Loyola: An Attempt at an Impartial Biography (London: Macmillan, 1923)
- PRO VITA MONASTICA: An Essay in Defence of the Contemplative Virtues (1923)
- Cortés the Conqueror: The Exploits of the Earliest and Greatest of the Gentleman Adventurers in The New World (1926)
- Spain: A Short History of its Politics, Literature, and Art from Earliest Times to the Present (1926)
- La Fayette (1928)
- France: A Short History of its Politics, Literature, and Art from Earliest Times to the Present (1929)
- Henry of Navarre (1926)
- Alfred De Musset, 1810-1857 (1931)
- The Life of Edward the Black Prince, 1330-1376: the Flower of Knighthood out of All the World (1932)
- The Art of Happiness or the Teachings of Epicurus (1933)
- Dan Chaucer: An Introduction to the Poet, his Poetry, and his Times (1934)
- In Praise of Gentlemen (1935)
- Vienna: The Biography of a Bygone City (1939)
- Memoirs of an Epicurian (1940)
- Horace: A Biography (1947)
