= Hope Leslie =

1827 novel by Catharine Maria Sedgwick

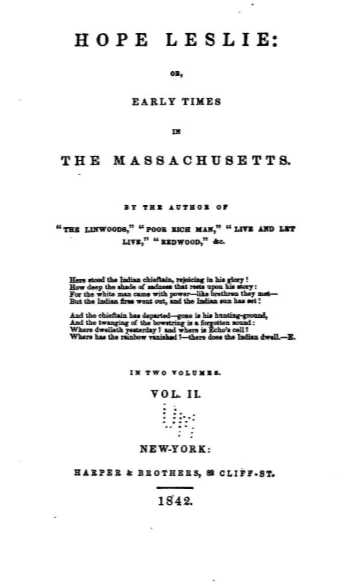
- Title page for Hope Leslie, or, Early Times in the Massachusetts (1842)
- Author: Catharine Maria Sedgwick
- Original title: Early Times in Massachusetts
- Language: English
- Publication date: 1827

Hope Leslie, or, Early Times in the Massachusetts is an 1827 novel written by Catharine Maria Sedgwick. The book is considered significant because of its strong feminist overtones and ideas of equity toward Native Americans. The book is a historical romance, set mostly in 1643. A number of historical figures appear, including Puritan leader John Winthrop, Puritan heretic Samuel Gorton, and the Pequot Native American Mononotto. A number of the novel's characters are survivors from the Pequot War (1636–1638).

== Plot summary ==
The story starts with William Fletcher, a young man who is in love with his cousin Alice. Her father has forbidden her marriage to Fletcher on account of religious differences. After he thwarts Alice's attempt to elope with Fletcher to North America, he forces her into an arranged marriage with Charles Leslie instead. In despair, Fletcher decides to leave England and relocate to the Massachusetts Bay Colony, where he marries an orphan girl named Martha although he is still in love with Alice. He founds a household several miles out of town and has five children, including Everell. He receives word that Charles and Alice Leslie have both died, and that their children, who will be renamed Faith and Hope, will be coming to live with the Fletchers.

To address the increase in household work that the new children will bring, the family is supplied with two young Native Americans as servants: Magawisca and Oneco, the children of Mononotto, one of the Pequod chiefs. They have been displaced because of the previous year's Pequot War, in which the Pequod settlement was attacked and burned by the white settlers. Most of the household is suspicious of Magawisca, especially since she occasionally talks to Nelema, an old native woman living nearby. Everell, however, always maintains that she is trustworthy and has only the family's best interests at heart.

Everell maintains his faith in Magawisca when he and Digby, the faithful family servant, are keeping watch at night; they see Magawisca slip out of her bedroom and go to speak with Nelema. At this point, William Fletcher has gone to the coast to conduct business; he has sent Faith Leslie to live with the family, but has kept Hope Leslie with him because she reminds him of his former love Alice. Magawisca is conflicted, unsure whether she ought to tell Everell that her father is preparing a surprise raid on the household to reclaim his children; she feels a strong love for the family which has treated her with kindness, but ultimately says nothing as she is unwilling to betray her father. Digby goes away on an errand that Mrs. Fletcher insists on, and so Everell is left to defend the house in the event of an attack.

The Native Americans do attack and Everell wounds one but is unable to stop the ensuing bloodbath. Mrs. Fletcher and the young children are killed and Mononotto captures Everell and Faith Leslie, and reclaims his children Magawisca and Oneco.

Mr. Fletcher returns with Hope Leslie to his home later from the coast several hours after the fight only to find his entire family dead or missing; he mourns privately for a few days, then begins to act normally.

Meanwhile, the Native American group are attempting to reach their allies before they are caught by the settlers in pursuit. There are several close calls, but they eventually escape and reach the settlement. Magawisca attempts to help Everell escape, since she does not agree with her father's capture of the two white children, but she is unable to do so.

The natives prepare Everell for sacrifice; Mononotto is thrilled at the brave spirit with which he fought the invasion at the Fletcher home, and believes that he is a fitting sacrifice to avenge the death of his own son in the Pequod War, who was interrogated by white settlers before being killed in cold blood. Magawisca attempts to aid him, but is sent to an old woman's domicile and kept there by a stationed guard as the night wears on and the time for the sacrifice draws nigh. She is able to put the guard to sleep using an herbal sleeping tea that the old woman has in her hut, and escapes to help Everell. Everell, meanwhile, has been encircled by natives at a large rock. A moonbeam strikes his face; the natives interpret this as a sign that the sacrifice has been accepted and exult in the moment. Everell is resigned to his fate and bows his head to be killed. As the final blow is about to be struck, Magawisca leaps from the large rock which she has secretly scaled into the path of the blade. Mononotto, instead of killing Everell, cuts off his daughter's arm. In the ensuing shock of the natives, Magawisca and Everell embrace, and Everell escapes the circle and flees the encampment.

Meanwhile, Old Man Craddock gets bitten by a snake and refuses to let Hope Leslie near him so Hope calls on the old Indian servant, Nelema. Nelema cures Craddock's snakebite through a concoction that she made using Native American rituals. Jennet calls it witchcraft and Nelema is made to stand trial. Hope frees Nelema from jail and Nelema promises to send her sister Faith to her.

Hope is sent to live with the Winthrops in Boston for a while. Everell returns to America and stays with Mr. Fletcher, who now lives in Boston. Esther Downing, a niece of Mrs. Winthrop’s, becomes good friends with Hope. She seems to be everything that Hope is not: faithful, prudent, and studious. She is also kind. She tells a story of how Everell came to her death bed and her ensuing recovery. Esther is infatuated with Everell, which saddens Hope greatly. Everyone hopes Esther and Everell will marry, except Mr. Fletcher, who hopes to match the two children he raised.

The Winthrops want to pair Hope with Sir Philip Gardiner, a stranger who arrived in town on the same boat as Everell, and who has developed an interest in Hope Leslie. Sir Philip's page, Roslin, seems very odd indeed. It is later revealed that Roslin is Rosa, a former lover of Sir Philip's whom he has disguised as his male page. One evening, Hope and Esther attend a lecture pertaining to the case of Mr. Gorton. Uncharacteristically, Hope appears quite anxious. We later learn that Hope had that day received a visit from Magawisca, whom she had made plans to meet in the cemetery at 9pm that night. On the way home from the lecture, Hope impatiently leaves her escort, Sir Philip, and takes a detour to the burial ground. Hope briefly meets Roslin, who tells her that she must not trust Sir Philip. Unknown to Hope, Sir Phillip follows her and overhears the conversation with Magawisca that night. Magawisca explains that Faith has married Oneco and tries to warn Hope that her sister is very different from the sister she remembers. Nelema managed to tell Magawisca that Hope had saved her and wanted to repay her with a visit from her sister. Magawisca also explains that her sister is now a Catholic.

To facilitate her meeting with Faith, Hope arranges for the party to stay on an island belonging to Winthrop, of which Digby is the guardian. While there, she implies to all present that Everell and Esther are going to get married, and puts their hands together. She never notices that Everell longs to be with her. Sir Philip comes, too, and she tells him that she never intends to marry him. Sir Phillip is upset by this.

Everyone else agrees to leave the island and Hope goes out to meet her sister on the shore. Hope embraces Faith and tries to talk to her only to realize that Faith no longer speaks English. Magawisca must interpret for them. Hope tries to get her to come home with her, but to no avail. As they are meeting, a trap is sprung upon them by Sir Philip. Magawisca and Faith are taken by colonial militiamen. Magawisca is imprisoned. Hope is taken captive by Oneco and meets up with Mononotto.

Mononotto is struck by lightning as Oneco is trying to get away. He stops to take care of his father and while he does so, Hope escapes, but then runs into a group of sailors who chase her. She climbs into a boat and the Italian sailor Antonio believes first that she is the Virgin Mary, and later that she is his patron saint. Hope does nothing to disabuse Antonio of this belief, and convinces him to row her to shore.

Sir Phillip goes and visits Magawisca in jail. He gives her tools to escape with a promise that she take Rosalin with her. She refuses. Sir Phillip gets choked by Morton, whom he had claimed to be visiting. Sir Philip's true nature is momentarily revealed.

Everell attempts to save Magawisca, but fails. Hope takes Cradock with her to the jail and cleverly disguises him to look like Magawisca. She is so pleasant that the guard, Barnaby Tuttle, doesn’t notice the deception. Hope and Magawisca escape from the jail and Everell meets them on their way to the river where Digby is waiting in a boat to take Magawisca anywhere she wishes to go. They say their goodbyes and Hope gives Magawisca the necklace that Everell had made for her while he was away so Magawisca will remember them both. Magawisca gets away safely. The Winthrops all realize that Hope is gone. Everell returns Hope to her home in what he believes will be the last time he sees her.

Esther has realized that Everell and Hope love each other and she decides to return to England for a few years and remain unmarried. As if to right the original wrong of separating William Fletcher from Alice, their children, Everell Fletcher and Hope Leslie, are finally united.

== Publication history and response ==
Hope Leslie, or, Early Times in Massachusetts was first published in two volumes in 1827. The book was Sedgwick's third novel. The book was successful and critics compared it to James Fenimore Cooper's The Last of the Mohicans, another early American novel. The North American Review praised Hope Leslie as an example of "the female influence in literature", specifically its ability to influence positively, but warned against women authors who "have forgotten their sex".
