= John Wilbur Dwight =

American politician

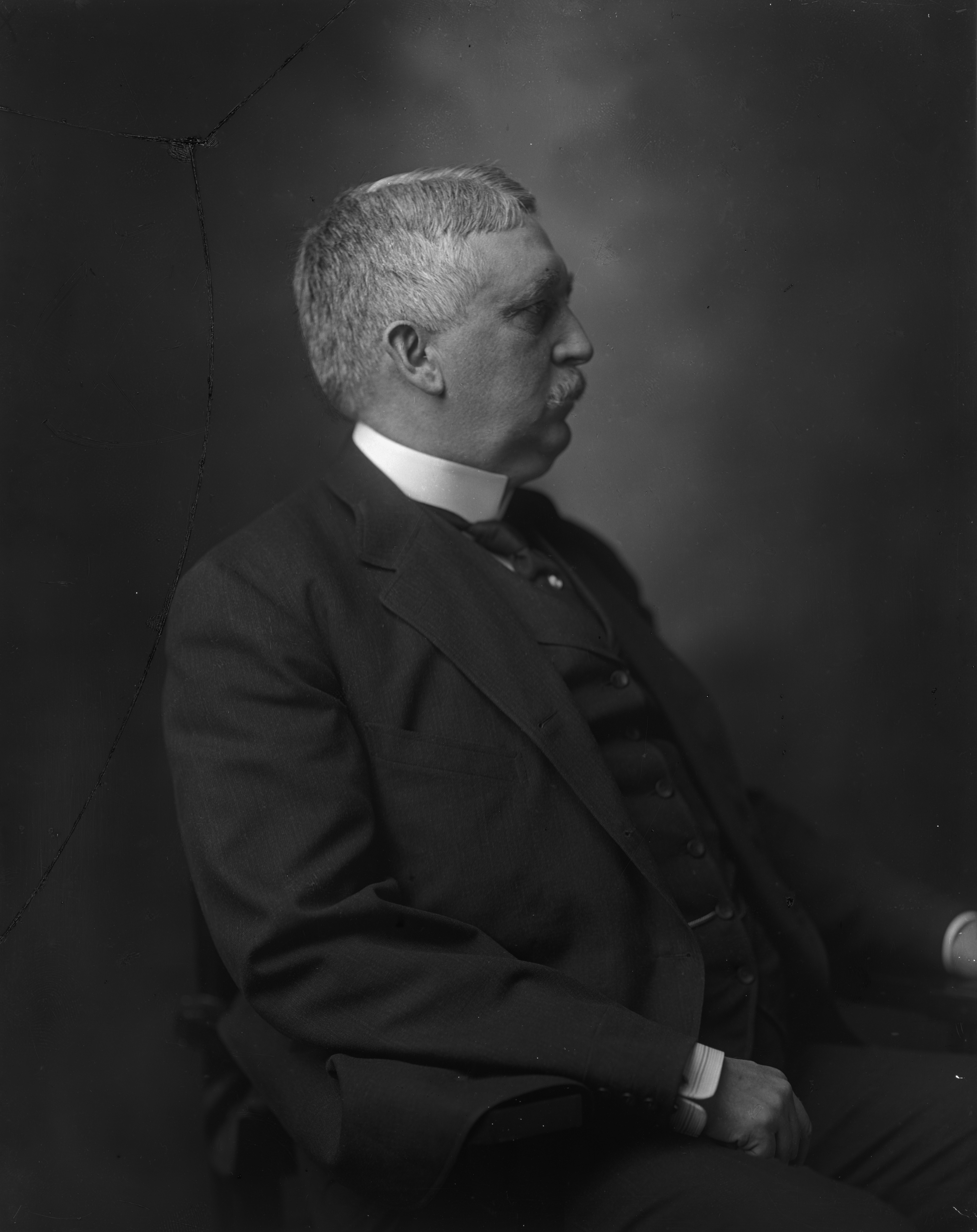
John W. Dwight, Congressman from New York

John Wilbur Dwight (May 24, 1859 – January 28, 1928) was a U.S. political figure. He served as a member of the United States House of Representatives from New York from 1902 to 1913. He also served as House majority whip between 1909 and 1911. He then became House minority whip from 1911 to 1913.

Dwight was born May 24, 1859, in Dryden, New York. His father, Jeremiah Wilbur Dwight (1819–1885), was a prominent politician and businessman in New York of the New England Dwight family. His mother was Rebecca Anne Cady. After his retirement from Congress, John Dwight continued to live in Washington, D.C., and died there. He served as President of the Virginia Blue Ridge Railway from 1913 to 1928. Dwight was a member of the Republican Party.

Dwight died on January 28, 1928, in Washington, D. C. He was buried at Rock Creek Cemetery.

U.S. House of Representatives
Preceded by George W. Ray	Member of the U.S. House of Representatives from New York's 26th congressional district 1902-11-04 – 1903	Succeeded by William H. Flack
Preceded by James W. Wadsworth, Sr.	Member of the U.S. House of Representatives from New York's 30th congressional district 1903–1913	Succeeded by Samuel Wallin
Party political offices
Preceded by James Eli Watson (R-IN)	House Majority Whip; 1909–1911	Succeeded by Thomas Montgomery Bell (D-GA) (The Democrats had no whip 1909–1913; Bell served 1913–1915)
Preceded by James Tilghman Lloyd (D-MO) (The Democrats had no whip 1909–1913; Lloyd served 1901–1908)	House Minority Whip; 1911–1913	Succeeded by Charles H. Burke (R-SD)
Preceded by James Eli Watson (IN)	House Republican Whip; 1909–1913	Succeeded by Charles H. Burke (SD)
