= Helen Stern =

American sculptor (1930–2019)

- Born: Helen Phillips Burroughs; July 4, 1930; Manchester, New Hampshire, U.S.
- Died: November 11, 2019 (aged 89); District of Columbia, U.S.
- Education: Wells College; Smith College
- Occupations: Sculptor, art patron
- Spouse(s): Henry Dwight Sedgwick V Philip M. Stern
- Children: 5, including Mike
- Parent: Robert P. Burroughs

Helen "Leni" Stern (July 4, 1930 – November 11, 2019) was an American sculptor and art patron.
