= Charles Sedgwick Minot =

American anatomist (1852–1914)

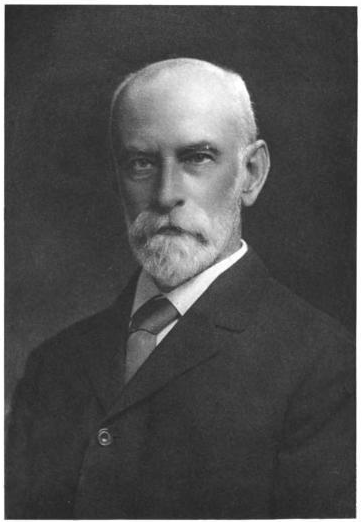
- Born: December 23, 1852; Roxbury, Massachusetts
- Died: November 19, 1914 (aged 61); Milton, Massachusetts
- Education: Massachusetts Institute of Technology (1872)
- Occupations: Anatomist, writer
- Relatives: Catharine Sedgwick (great aunt)

Charles Sedgwick Minot (December 23, 1852 – November 19, 1914) was an American anatomist and a founding member of the American Society for Psychical Research.

== Life ==
Charles Sedgwick Minot was born December 23, 1852, in Roxbury, Massachusetts. His mother was Catharine "Kate" Maria Sedgwick (1820–1880) and father was William Minot II (1817–1894). Through his mother, namesake of her aunt, novelist Catharine Sedgwick (1789–1867), he was twice connected to the New England Dwight family of academics.

He graduated from the Massachusetts Institute of Technology in 1872, studied biology at Leipzig, Paris, and Würzburg. At Harvard Medical School he taught from 1880 till his death as the James Stillman Professor of comparative anatomy in 1905 and director of the anatomical laboratories in 1912.

Minot was elected to the American Academy of Arts and Sciences in 1882. He was elected to the American Philosophical Society in 1896 and the United States National Academy of Sciences in 1897. He was president of the American Association for the Advancement of Science in 1901, and of the Association of American Anatomists from 1904 to 1905, and was corresponding member of various foreign societies.

Honorary degrees were conferred on him by Yale University, the University of Toronto, St. Andrews, and Oxford. From 1912 to 1913 he served as Harvard exchange professor at Berlin and Jena. He died on November 19, 1914, in Milton, Massachusetts.

His cousin once removed, George Richards Minot (1885–1950), named for his great-grandfather George Richards Minot (1758–1802), shared the Nobel Prize in Medicine in 1934.

Minot was a founding member of the American Society for Psychical Research. He later resigned due to its unscientific outlook. He was highly critical of Alfred Percy Sinnett's Esoteric Buddhism and the claims of Theosophy.

== Publications ==
In addition to many papers and monographs, his publications include:

- Human Embryology (1897), also in German
- A Laboratory Text-Book of Embryology (1903; second edition, 1910)
- The Problem of Age, Growth, and Death (1908)
- Die Methode der Wissenschaft (1913)
- Modern Problems of Biology (1913), also in French
