= Agrippa Hull =

American revolutionary and landowner (1759–1843)

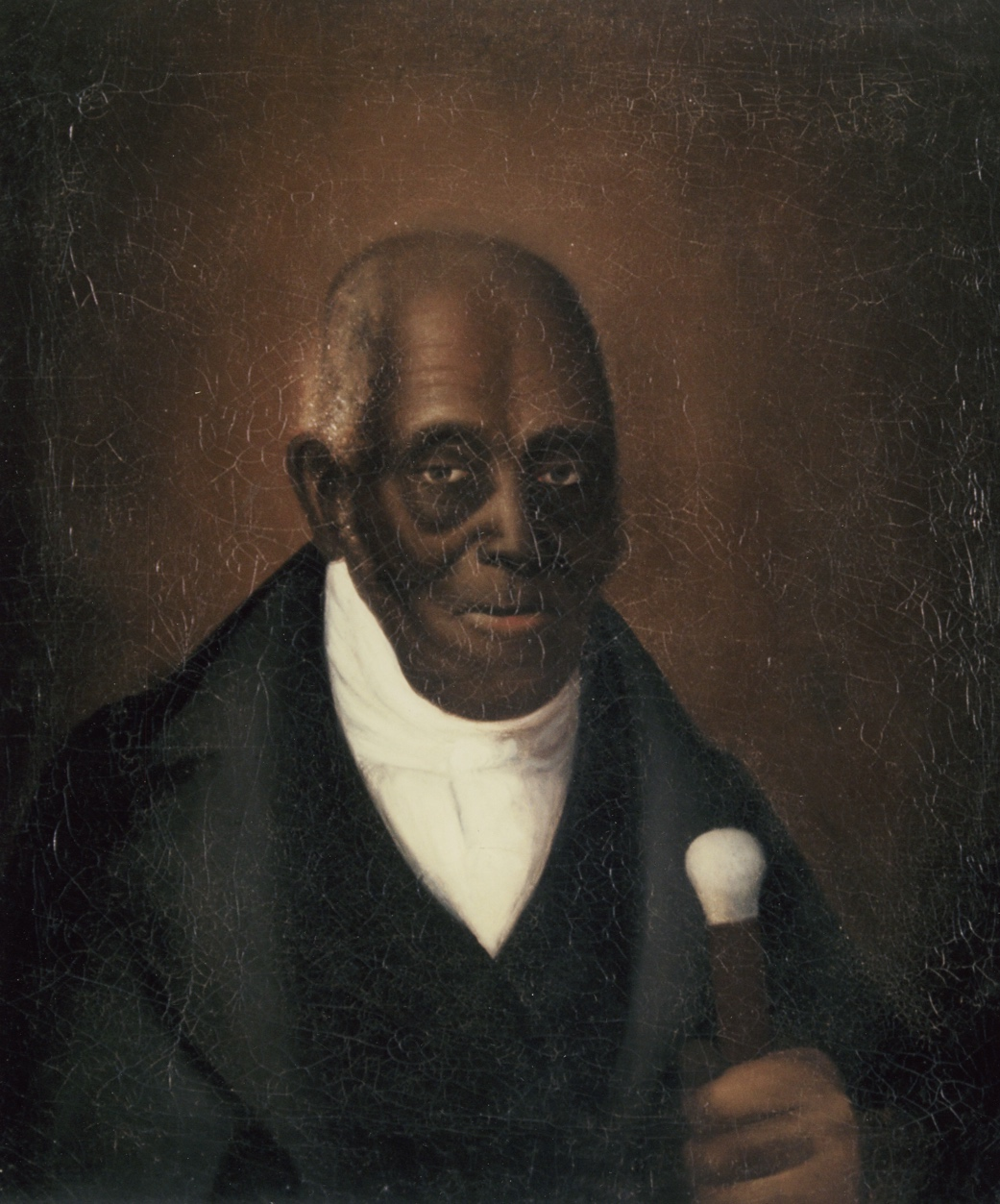
- Agrippa Hull in the 1840s.
- Born: March 7, 1759; Northampton, Massachusetts Bay, British America
- Died: May 21, 1848 (aged 89); Stockbridge, Massachusetts, U.S.

Agrippa Hull (March 7, 1759 – May 21, 1848) was an American patriot who served as an orderly to Tadeusz Kościuszko, a Polish military officer, engineer and nobleman, for five years during the American Revolutionary War. After the war, he received a veteran's pension and retired to Stockbridge, where he became known as the most prominent black landowner.

== Early life, education, military service ==
Hull was born free on March 7, 1759 in Northampton, Massachusetts. His name was said to be derived from Herod Agrippa II, a biblical figure from the New Testament.

At eighteen years old, in 1777, Hull enlisted to fight with the Patriots for six years. For nearly five years, he was a personal aide for Tadeusz Kościuszko, the Polish engineer and nobleman who was essential to Continental defences. He also assisted the medical corps in caring for the sick and wounded. In the last two years, he worked with doctors and was trained to perform simple operations, including amputations of body parts and fixing broken bones.

Impressed with Hull and other black Continental soldiers, Kościuszko became a strong supporter of abolitionism. In 1798, Kościuszko named his friend Thomas Jefferson as executor of his will; he intended to use his American estate to purchase freedom for black slaves, including those of Jefferson, and provide them with vocational training and land to be able to provide for themselves and their families. However, after he died in 1817, neither the elderly Jefferson nor another executor carried out his plans. The funds were eventually transferred in 1852 to his heirs in Poland.

== Return to Massachusetts ==
When the war was over, Hull returned to Massachusetts. He used his savings to buy land in Stockbridge, where, over the years, he became one of the largest black landowners in the town. He steadily purchased properties from his savings from work. After the war, he worked for a period as a servant in the household of Theodore Sedgwick. As a young attorney, the latter had defended Elizabeth Freeman (Mum Bett) in her freedom suit and helped gain an end to slavery in Massachusetts. Freeman worked for the Sedgewick household for years as well. Sedgwick became a state politician and US Senator before being appointed as a justice for the Massachusetts State Supreme Court.
