= Elizabeth Freeman =

American woman (1744–1829)

Elizabeth Freeman (a.k.a. Mumbet)
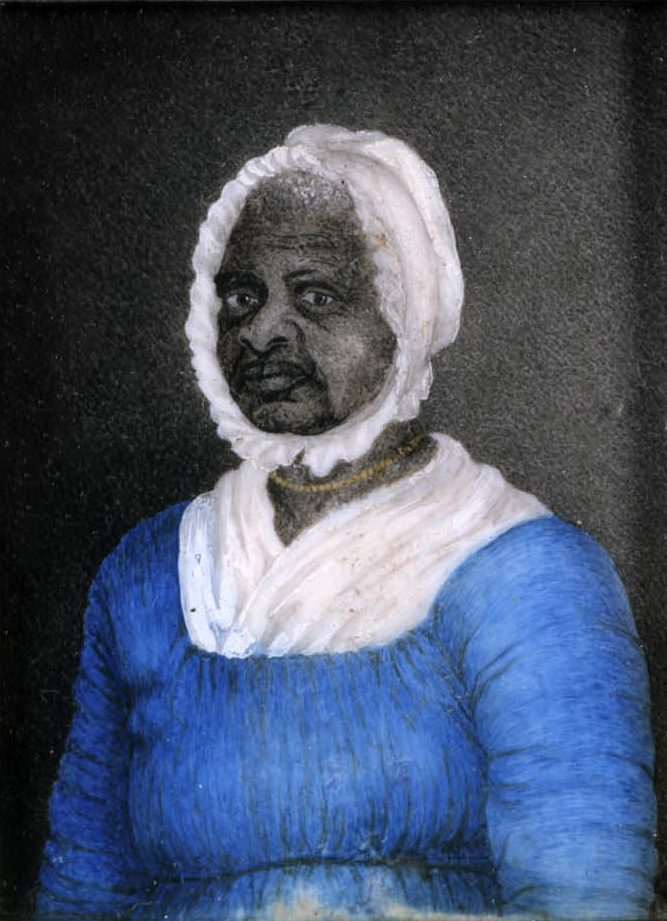
- Portrait by Susan Anne Ridley Sedgwick, c. 1812
- Born: c. 1744; Claverack, Province of New York
- Died: December 28, 1829 (aged 84–85); Stockbridge, Massachusetts, U.S.
- Other names: Bett, Mumbet, Mum Bett
- Occupations: Midwife, herbalist, servant
- Known for: Brom and Bett v. Ashley (1781), gained freedom based on constitutional right to liberty

Elizabeth Freeman (c. 1744 – December 28, 1829), also known as Mumbet, (Note: Variously also Bet or Mum Bett.) was one of the first slaves to file and win a freedom suit in Massachusetts. The Massachusetts Supreme Judicial Court, ruling in Freeman's favor, found slavery to be inconsistent with the 1780 Constitution of Massachusetts. Her suit, Brom and Bett v. Ashley (1781), was cited in the Massachusetts Supreme Judicial Court appellate review of Quock Walker's freedom suit. When the court upheld Walker's freedom under the state's constitution, the ruling was considered to have implicitly ended slavery in Massachusetts.

Any time, any time while I was a slave, if one minute's freedom had been offered to me, and I had been told I must die at the end of that minute, I would have taken it—just to stand one minute on God's airth [sic] a free woman—I would.

— Elizabeth Freeman

== Biography ==
Freeman was illiterate and left no written records of her life. Her early history has been pieced together from the writings of contemporaries to whom she told her story or who heard it indirectly, as well as from historical records.

Freeman was born into slavery on April 4, 1744, on the plantation of Pieter Hogeboom in Claverack, New York, where she was given the name Bet. When Hogeboom's daughter Hannah married John Ashley of Sheffield, Massachusetts, Hogeboom gave Bet, around seven years old, to Hannah and her husband. Freeman remained with them until 1781, when she had a child, Little Bet. She is said to have married, though no marriage record has been located. Her husband (name unknown) is said to have never returned from service in the American Revolutionary War.

Throughout her life, Bet exhibited a strong spirit and sense of self. She came into conflict with Hannah Ashley, who was raised in the strict Dutch culture of the New York colony. While John Ashley was even-tempered and well-liked within his community, Hannah Ashley was ill-tempered and snappy, particularly towards her slaves. In 1780, Bet prevented Hannah from striking a servant girl with a heated shovel; Bet shielded the girl and received a deep wound in her arm. As the wound healed, Bet left it uncovered as evidence of her harsh treatment. Catharine Sedgwick quotes Elizabeth: "Madam never again laid her hand on Lizzy. I had a bad arm all winter, but Madam had the worst of it. I never covered the wound, and when people said to me, before Madam,—'Why, Betty! what ails your arm?' I only answered—'ask missis!'"

John Ashley was a Yale-educated lawyer, wealthy landowner, businessman, slaveholder, and community leader. His house was the site of many political discussions and the probable location of the signing of the Sheffield Declaration, which predated the United States Declaration of Independence.

== Brom and Bett v. Ashley (1781) ==
In 1780, Freeman either heard the newly ratified Massachusetts Constitution read at a public gathering in Sheffield or overheard her enslaver discussing it in the home. She heard what included the following:

All men are born free and equal, and have certain natural, essential, and unalienable rights; among which may be reckoned the right of enjoying and defending their lives and liberties; that of acquiring, possessing, and protecting property; in fine, that of seeking and obtaining their safety and happiness.

— Massachusetts Constitution, Article 1.

The day after, inspired by these words, Bet sought the counsel of Theodore Sedgwick, a young abolition-minded lawyer, to help her sue for freedom in court. According to Catherine Sedgwick's account, she told him: "I heard that paper read yesterday, that says, all men are created equal, and that every man has a right to freedom. I'm not a dumb critter; won't the law give me my freedom?" After much deliberation, Sedgwick accepted her case, as well as that of Brom, another of Ashley's slaves. It is to be considered, however, that Brom was added to the case to strengthen it as "women had such limited legal rights" during the 18th century. Sedgwick had not acted on the issues of slavery until he represented Freeman.

Sedgwick enlisted the aid of Tapping Reeve, the founder of Litchfield Law School, one of America's earliest law schools, located in Litchfield, Connecticut. They were two of the top lawyers in Massachusetts, and Sedgwick later served as a US Senator. Arthur Zilversmit suggests the attorneys may have selected these plaintiffs to determine the status of slavery under the new state constitution. This meant that when Sedgwick took on the case, he hoped to find an answer to the question of constitutionality regarding slavery in Massachusetts through his representation of Freeman in court. Hence, Brom and Bett v. Ashley (1781) was a "test case".

One of the notable arguments that was made on behalf of Freeman was her designation as a 'Spinster' during the trial. This title was given to her in court which effectively assigned her a legal status, other than a slave, even before the verdict was released. This argument was derived from the fact that 'Spinsters' were legally independent, had the ability to sue, to own property, and to make contracts.

The case of Brom and Bett v. Ashley was heard in August 1781 by the County Court of Common Pleas in Great Barrington. Sedgwick and Reeve asserted that the constitutional provision that "all men are born free and equal" effectively abolished slavery in the state. When the jury ruled in Bett's favor, she became the first African-American woman to be set free under the Massachusetts state constitution.

The jury found that "Brom & Bett are not, nor were they at the time of the purchase of the original writ the legal Negro of the said John Ashley." However, like many slave owners, Ashley refrained from admitting to the true nature of his actions. While arguing for his right to own Brom and Bett in court, Ashley described them as his servants for life rather than slaves. This intentional word choice likely alludes to his objective of appealing to both the conservative and liberal members of the jury.

The court assessed damages of thirty shillings and awarded both plaintiffs compensation for their labor. Ashley initially appealed the decision but a month later dropped his appeal, apparently having decided the court's ruling on the constitutionality of slavery was "final and binding."

Sedgwick (its author) and Ashley both served on the committee that approved the Sheffield Resolves (resisting British rule), prior to finding themselves opposing each other in this case.

== Relationship with the Sedgwicks ==
After the ruling, Bet took the name Elizabeth Freeman. Although Ashley asked her to return to his house and work for wages, she chose to work in attorney Sedgwick's household. She worked for his family until 1808 as a senior servant and governess to the Sedgwick children, and in fact, the name "Mumbet" that Freeman is commonly called was invented by the Sedgwick children.

The Sedgwick children were known to have a close relationship with Freeman as she was an integral part of the family. Of the Sedgwick children, Catharine Sedgwick later became a well-known author and wrote a biography of her governess's life in her book, Slavery in New England (1853). Also working at the Sedgwick household during much of this time was Agrippa Hull, a free black man who had served with the Continental Army for years during the American Revolutionary War.

Freeman is believed to have spent more than two decades acting as a motherly figure for Theodore and Pamela Sedgwick's children, as Pamela was suffering from a mental illness that prevented her from being fully present. From the time Freeman gained her freedom, she became widely recognized and in demand for her skills as a healer, midwife, and nurse. After the Sedgwick children were grown, and Freeman had spent about 20 years saving money, Freeman moved into her own house on Cherry Hill in Stockbridge, near her daughter, grandchildren, and great-grandchildren.

Freeman orchestrated an impressive mortgage arrangement and purchased land with her son-in-law, Jonah Humphrey. Notably, this property neighbored Agrippa Hull's property. She later became a sole owner of the property when she bought out Humphrey. Her will distributed roughly 20 acres, a house, a working farm, and other personal property to her descendants.

== Death ==
Freeman's actual age was never known, but an estimate on her tombstone puts her age at about 85. She died in December 1829 and was buried in the Sedgwick family plot in Stockbridge, Massachusetts. Freeman remains the only non-Sedgwick buried in the Sedgwick plot. They provided a tombstone inscribed as follows:

ELIZABETH FREEMAN, also known by the name of MUMBET died Dec. 28th 1829. Her supposed age was 85 Years. She was born a slave and remained a slave for nearly thirty years; She could neither read nor write, yet in her own sphere she had no superior or equal. She neither wasted time nor property. She never violated a trust, nor failed to perform a duty. In every situation of domestic trial, she was the most efficient helper and the tenderest friend. Good mother, farewell.

== Legacy ==
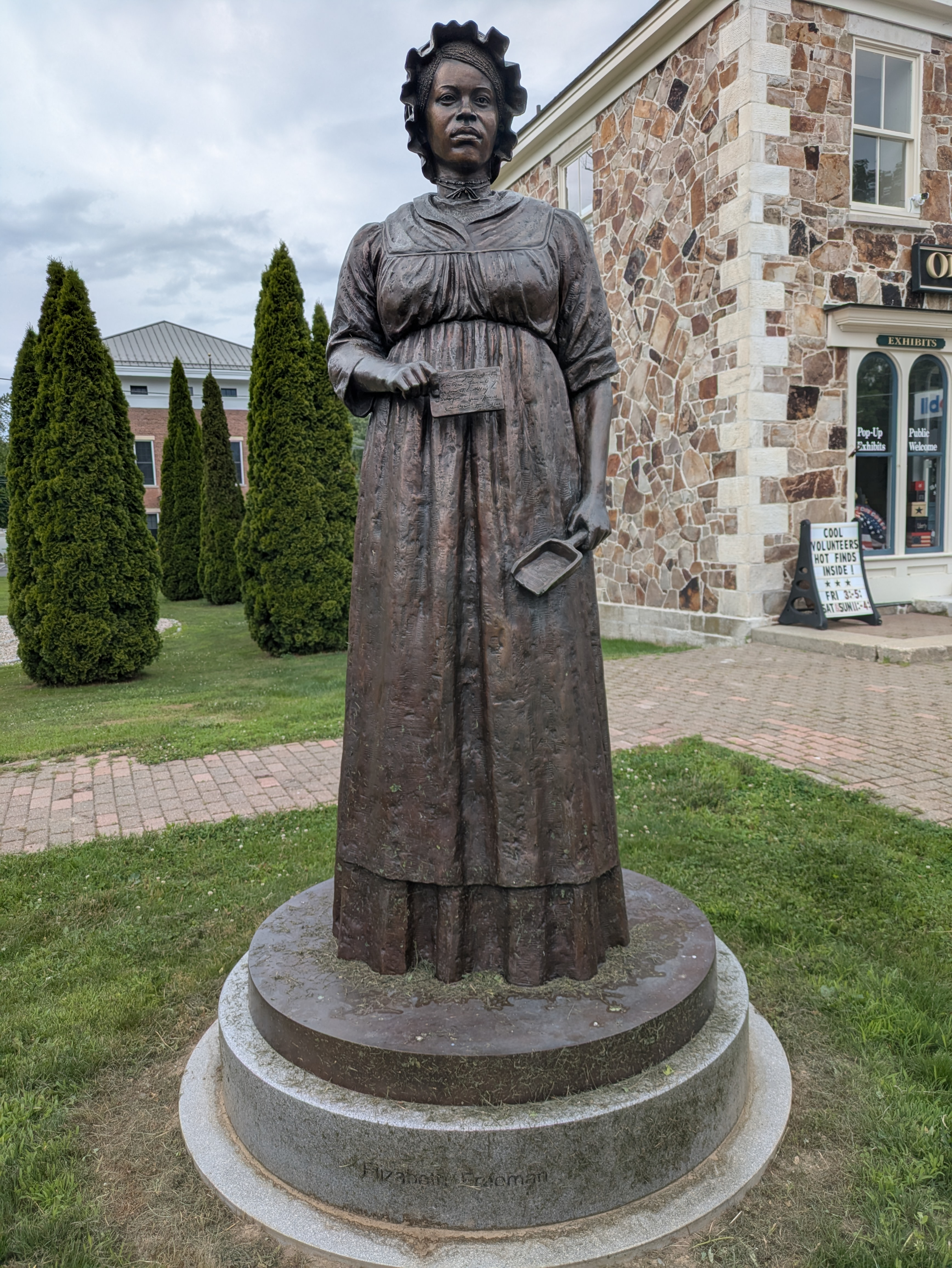
Statue in Sheffield

The decision in the 1781 case of Elizabeth Freeman was cited as precedent when the Massachusetts Supreme Judicial Court heard the appeal of Quock Walker v. Jennison later that year and upheld Walker's freedom. These cases set the legal precedents that ended slavery in Massachusetts. Vermont had already abolished it explicitly in its constitution.

The gold bead necklace visible in the portrait of Freeman was re-made into a bracelet and carries her nickname. This necklace was re-made by Catharine Sedgwick as she obtained it after Freeman had died.

Freeman is the namesake of the Elizabeth Freeman Center, a Berkshire County organization dedicated to combating domestic and sexual violence.

A celebration of Elizabeth Freeman's role in the walk to freedom included unveiling a statue in her honor by the Sheffield Historical Society in August 2022.

=== Connection to W. E. B. Du Bois ===
Civil Rights leader and historian W. E. B. Du Bois claimed Freeman as his relative and wrote that she married his maternal great-grandfather, "Jack" Burghardt. However, Freeman was 20 years senior to Burghardt, and no record of such a marriage has been found. It may have been Freeman's daughter, Betsy Humphrey, who married Burghardt after her first husband, Jonah Humphrey, left the area "around 1811" after Burghardt's first wife died (c. 1810). If so, Freeman would have been Du Bois's step-great-great-grandmother. Anecdotal evidence supports Humphrey's marrying Burghardt; a close relationship of some form is likely.

=== In the media and arts ===
- Season 1, episode 37 of the television show Liberty's Kids, titled "Born Free and Equal", is about Elizabeth Freeman. It was first aired in 2003, and in it, she was voiced by Yolanda King.
- The story of Elizabeth Freeman was featured in season 1, episode 4, of Finding Your Roots with Henry Louis Gates, Jr. Freeman's lawyer, Theodore Sedgwick, is the fourth great-grandfather of Kyra Sedgwick, one of the guests of the episode.
- The Portuguese fiber artist Joana Vasconcelos created a large installation in Freeman's honor in 2020 entitled Valkyrie Mumbet for the MassArt Art Museum (MAAM) in Boston, MA.
- Elizabeth Freeman's identity as a determined individual was captured in the book written for children and adolescents titled "A Free Woman On God's Earth: The True Story of Elizabeth "Mumbet" Freeman, The Slave Who Won Her Freedom" by authors Jana Laiz and Ann-Elizabeth Barnes.
- Freeman and her contributions are honored at D.C.’s Museum of African American History, and Philadelphia’s Museum of the American Revolution.
- A portrait of Freeman was included in the United States Postal Service's Figures of the American Revolution stamp collection in 2026, the only Black woman and enslaved person among the subjects.

=== Impact as a pioneer ===
Elizabeth Freeman has been noted as "the Rosa Parks of her time". Freeman's actions helped to inspire the abolitionist movement.

== See also ==
- American slave court cases
- List of slaves
- List of civil rights leaders
- Nathaniel Booth (slave)
- Elizabeth Key Grinstead
- Sojourner Truth
