= Ellery Sedgwick =

American writer and publisher (1872–1960)

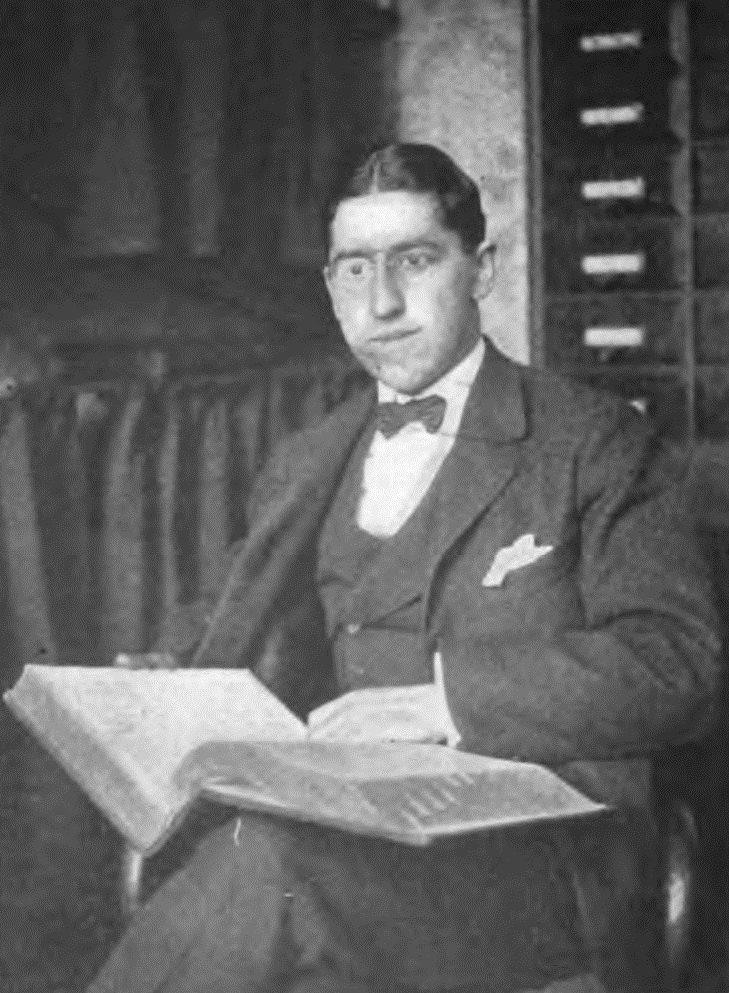
- Born: February 27, 1872; New York City, New York, U.S.
- Died: April 21, 1960 (aged 88); Washington, D.C., U.S.
- Resting place: Stockbridge Cemetery (Sedgwick Pie)
- Education: Groton School
- Alma mater: Harvard University
- Occupation: Editor
- Spouse(s): Mabel Cabot (1904–1937); Isabel Marjorie Russell (1939–1960)
- Children: Ellery Sedgwick Jr. Cabot Sedgwick; Theodora Sedgwick; Henrietta Sedgwick
- Parent(s): Henry Dwight Sedgwick II; Henrietta Ellery
- Relatives: William Ellery (maternal grandfather); Henry Dwight Sedgwick (brother)

Ellery Sedgwick (February 27, 1872 – April 21, 1960) was an American editor, brother of Henry Dwight Sedgwick.

== Early life ==
He was born in New York City to Henry Dwight Sedgwick II and Henrietta Ellery (Sedgwick), grand daughter of William Ellery. His ancestors, a leading family of Stockbridge, Massachusetts, established a tradition of literary achievement, including authors Catherine Maria Sedgwick and Henry Dwight Sedgwick III.

== Career ==
Sedgwick graduated from Groton School in 1890 and from Harvard University in 1894. He returned to Groton in 1894 and taught classics there until 1896. Subsequently, he was assistant editor of the Youth's Companion at Boston (1896–1900) and in New York worked as editor of Leslie's Monthly Magazine (1900–05) and the American Magazine (1906–07). He was associated with McClure's Magazine for short periods and with the publishing house of D. Appleton & Co., in 1909. He returned to Boston to be editor of the Atlantic Monthly and president of the Atlantic Monthly Company. In 1915, he was elected to the National Institute of Arts and Letters. From his pen came The Life of Thomas Paine (1899).

When Sedgwick purchased the Atlantic Monthly in 1908, the monthly circulation was 15,000 and the magazine ran an annual deficit of $5,000. He worked quickly to reverse the trend and by 1928, he had increased circulation to 137,000. He has been credited with discovering many writers and with having the Atlantic Monthly be the first national magazine to publish a work of Ernest Hemingway's (the short story Fifty Grand, July 1927). Sedgwick resigned as editor in 1938 and sold the magazine in 1939.

== Personal life ==
Sedgwick married gardener and horticulturist Mabel Cabot in 1904. They had four children: Ellery Jr., Cabot, Theodora, and Henrietta. Mabel Sedgwick designed the gardens at Long Hill, the 114-acre home in Beverly, Massachusetts. She died in 1937. He remarried in 1939 to an Englishwoman, (Isabel) Marjorie Russell, who became a celebrated horticulturalist. Their summer home in Beverly Massachusetts was renowned for its extensive gardens, and is now the headquarters of the Trustees of Reservations. Sedgwick's son Ellery Jr grew to become a significant player in finance and investments, Cabot was a career diplomat with the US State Department and the father of actress and author Paulita Sedgwick, Theodora worked extensively in South-East Asia and was the wife of Brigadier General William Bond, and Henrietta became a well known horticulturalist in her own right.

== Death ==
Sciatica made Sedgwick bedridden for a few months in 1938–1939, and he was also plagued with arthritis. He died in 1960 in Washington, D.C., and is buried in the Sedgwick family plot in Stockbridge.
