= Sedgwick Pie =

Cemetery plot in Massachusetts, US

Coordinates: 42.285354°N 73.318018°W

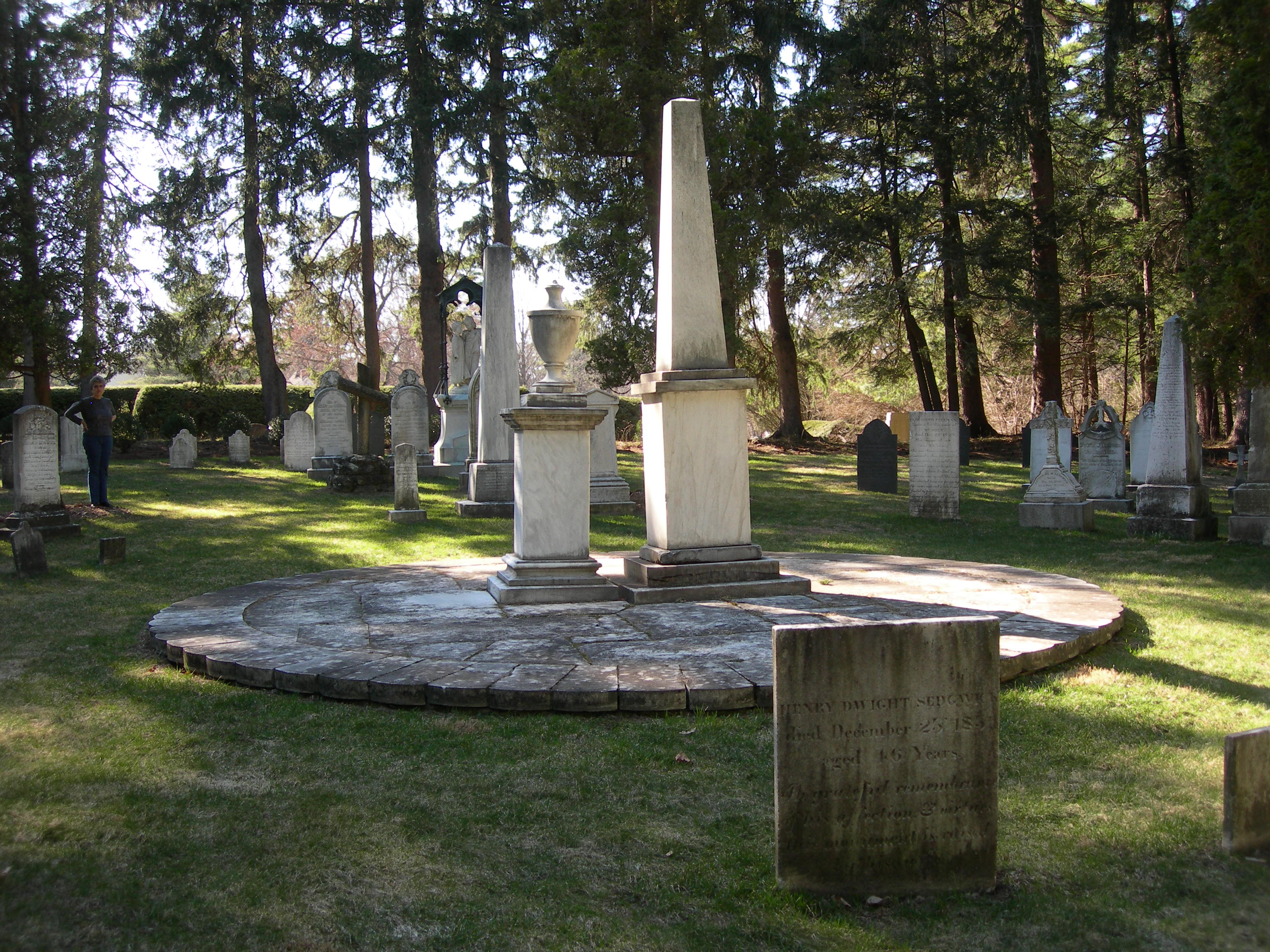
Sedgwick Pie at Stockbridge Cemetery

The "Sedgwick Pie" is a late 18th century cemetery plot in Massachusetts, USA. It is the family burial plot of the Sedgwick family in Stockbridge Cemetery, Stockbridge, and gets its nickname from its shape and layout.

== Description ==
The burial sites are arranged around the graves of Theodore Sedgwick (1746–1813), patriarch of the prominent Sedgwick family of New England and a justice of the Massachusetts Supreme Judicial Court (among other positions), and his wife, Pamela Dwight Sedgwick (1753–1807). The graves of the others, who include in-laws, servants, and family pets, form concentric circles around the center, with the buried grouped by familial affiliation and laid to rest with their feet toward the center. This contrasts with the orientation of the other graves in the cemetery, which (in classic fashion) face east, toward the rising sun, Jerusalem (with all its religious significance), and the hoped-for Resurrection. It has been said that this arrangement of the graves sees to it that on Judgment Day, when the Sedgwicks rise to face their judge, they will only have to look at other Sedgwicks.

"The Pie" has become something of an attraction for those interested in unusual cemetery plots, grave tours, and the like.

== Occupants ==
Notable persons buried in the Pie include:

- Theodore Sedgwick (1746–1813)
- Elizabeth Freeman (Mum Bett) (c. 1742 – 1829)
- Catharine Sedgwick (1789–1867)
- Francis James Child (1825–1896)
- Henry Dwight Sedgwick (1861–1957)
- Ellery Sedgwick (1872–1960)
- Brigadier General William R. Bond (1918–1970)

== Cultural references ==
The Pie is the first topic of discussion in Edie: An American Biography, by Jean Stein and George Plimpton (Knopf, 1982). The book is a discussion of the life and career of Edie Sedgwick, who, although a member of the family, is not buried there but in the small Oak Hill Cemetery in Ballard, California. Her epitaph reads "Edith Sedgwick Post – Wife Of Michael Brett Post 1943–1971". Her mother, Alice, was buried next to her in 1988.

== Bibliography ==
- Eric Goldscheider, "Stockbridge Stoutly Savors Being Small", The Boston Globe, November 6, 2005.
- John Sedgwick, In My Blood: Six Generations of Madness and Desire in an American Family (HarperCollins, 2007).
- Jean Stein and George Plimpton, Edie: An American Biography (Knopf, 1982).
- Linda Wertheimer, "The Sedgwicks: A History of 'Madness'", Weekend Edition Saturday, January 6, 2007.
