= Catharine Sedgwick =

American novelist

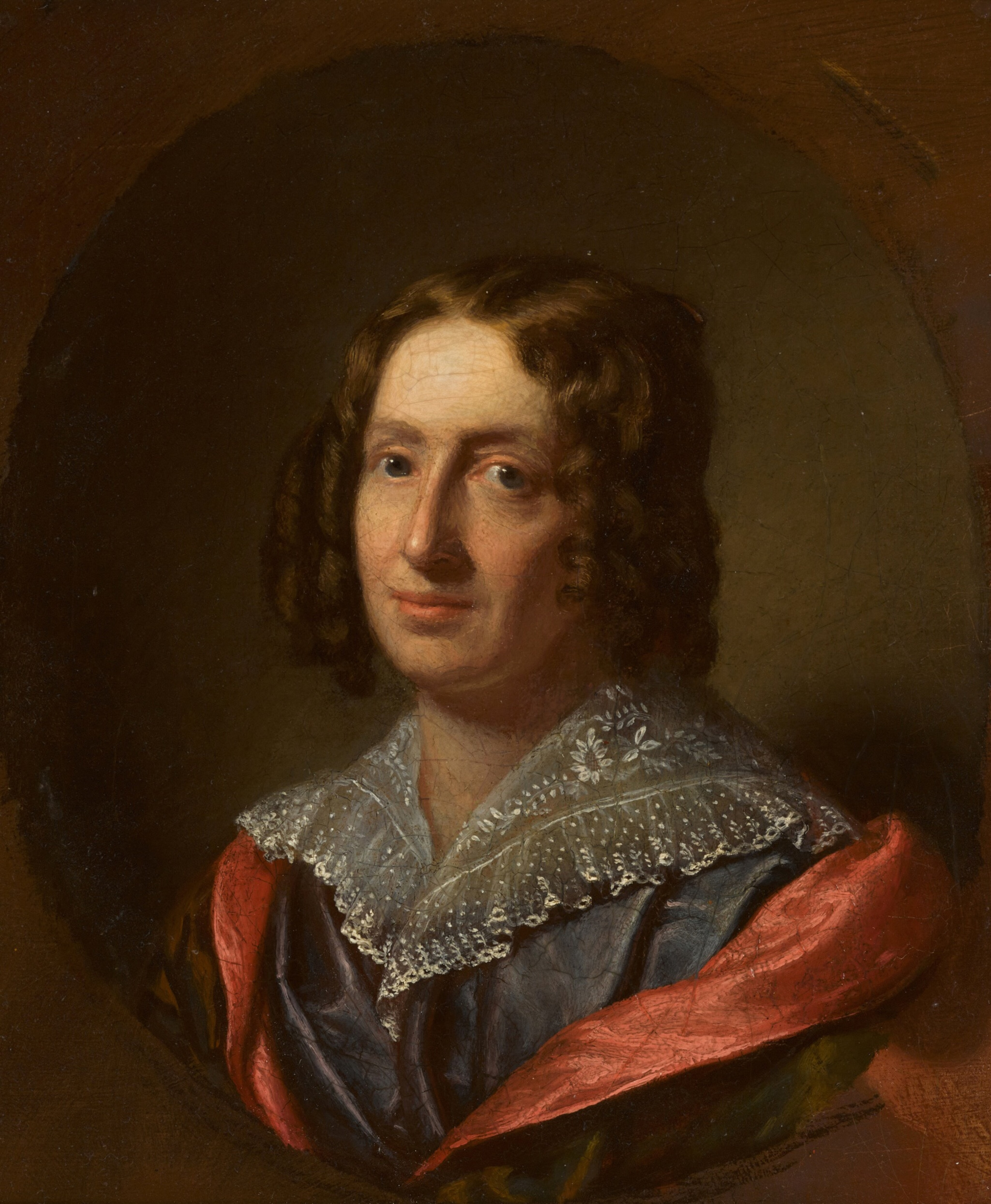
- portrait by Charles Cromwell Ingham
- Born: Catharine Maria Sedgwick; December 28, 1789; Stockbridge, Massachusetts, U.S.
- Died: July 31, 1867 (aged 77); Boston, Massachusetts, U.S.
- Resting place: Sedgwick plot in Stockbridge, Massachusetts, U.S.
- Occupation: Novelist
- Relatives: New England Dwight family, Joseph Dwight, Ephraim Williams, Theodore Sedgwick
- Writing career
- Language: English
- Period: 1822–1857
- Genre: Domestic fiction
- Notable works: Redwood; Hope Leslie

Signature
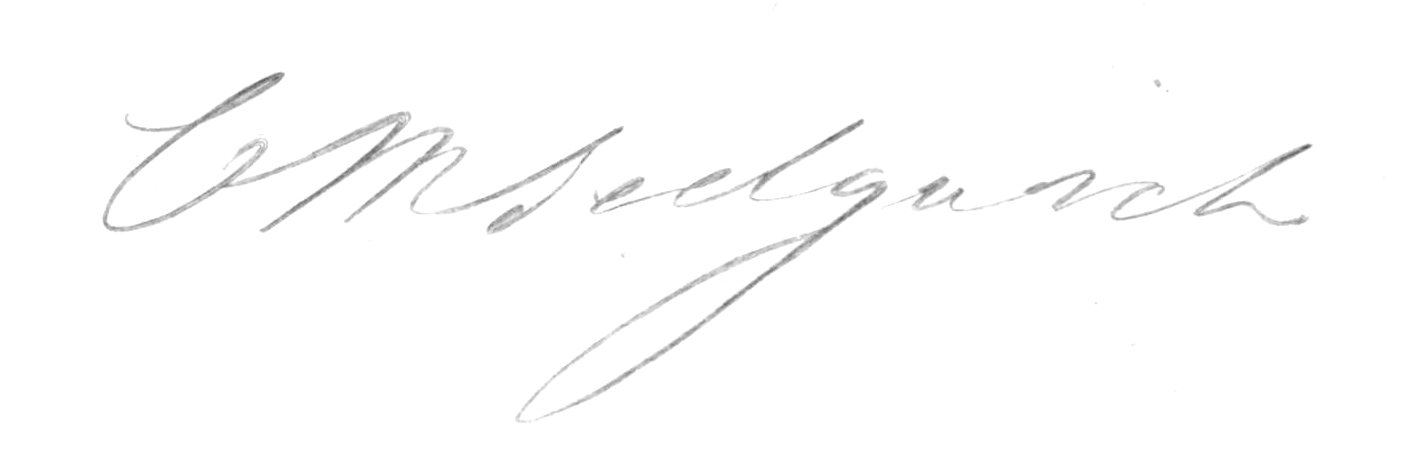

Catharine Maria Sedgwick (December 28, 1789 – July 31, 1867) was an American novelist of domestic fiction. From the 1820s to the 1850s, Sedgwick made a living writing short stories for a variety of periodicals. She became one of the most notable female novelists of her time. She wrote work in American settings, and combined patriotism with protests against historic Puritan oppressiveness. Her topics contributed to the creation of a national literature, enhanced by her detailed descriptions of nature. Sedgwick created spirited heroines who did not conform to the stereotypical conduct of women at the time. She promoted Republican motherhood.

== Early life and education ==
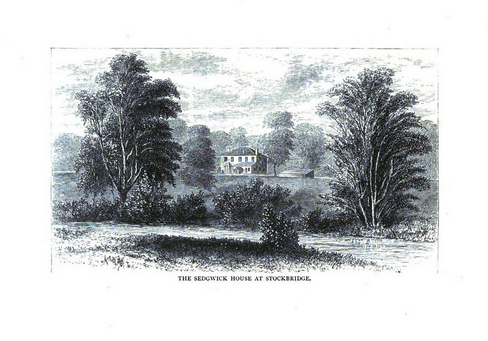
The Sedgwick home at Stockbridge.

Catharine Maria Sedgwick was born December 28, 1789, in Stockbridge, Massachusetts. Her mother was Pamela Dwight (1752–1807) of the New England Dwight family, daughter of General Joseph Dwight (1703–1765) and granddaughter of Ephraim Williams, founder of Williams College. Her father was Theodore Sedgwick (1746–1813), a prosperous lawyer and successful politician. He was later elected Speaker of the United States House of Representatives and in 1802, was appointed a justice of the Massachusetts Supreme Judicial Court.

Sedgwick's four brothers were educated for the law: they naturally followed the profession in which their father, Judge Sedgwick, had been eminent, yet only one of them followed him in the political career in which he had been equally distinguished. The eldest, Theodore, practiced law in Albany, New York and later served in the Massachusetts House of Representatives; Harry and Robert practiced law in New York; Charles, the youngest, practiced in Stockbridge. Her talents seem to have been appreciated by her brothers, Henry and Theodore, whose encouragement was acknowledged in the preface to a new edition of her works in 1849.

As a child, Sedgwick was cared for by Elizabeth Freeman (aka Mumbet), a former slave whose freedom Theodore Sedgwick helped gain by arguing her case in county court in 1781. After winning her freedom Freeman declined her previous owner's job offer, and instead accepted a job working for the Sedgwick family.

In her autobiography, Sedgwick refers to Elizabeth Freeman multiple times and reflects upon the influence Freeman had on Sedgwick's perception of the world. The integrity and pride that Freeman possessed regarding her own personal intelligence and understanding of the world can be reflected in Sedgwick's admiration of the woman.

When Sedgwick was seven or eight, she passed the summer under the care of her cousin Sabrina Parsons in Bennington, Vermont, at the house of the Rev. Mr. Swift, the husband of Sedgwick's aunt. At home, she attended the district schools, but no one dictated her studies or overlooked her progress. Reading, spelling, and Dwight's Geography were the only subjects taught, in addition to the first four rules of arithmetic, and the names of the several parts of speech. During her first winter in New York, when she was 11 years old, she studied dance under M. Lalliet, and had a French master who came three times a week. About two years later, she attended Mrs. Bell's boarding school in Albany, New York, as a day-scholar. At the age of 15, she was sent to Mr. Payne's boarding school in Boston to complete her education, and was there for six months. One of her schoolmates, Susan Anne Ridley Sedgwick (1788–1867), would become her sister-in-law and a published author.

== Career ==
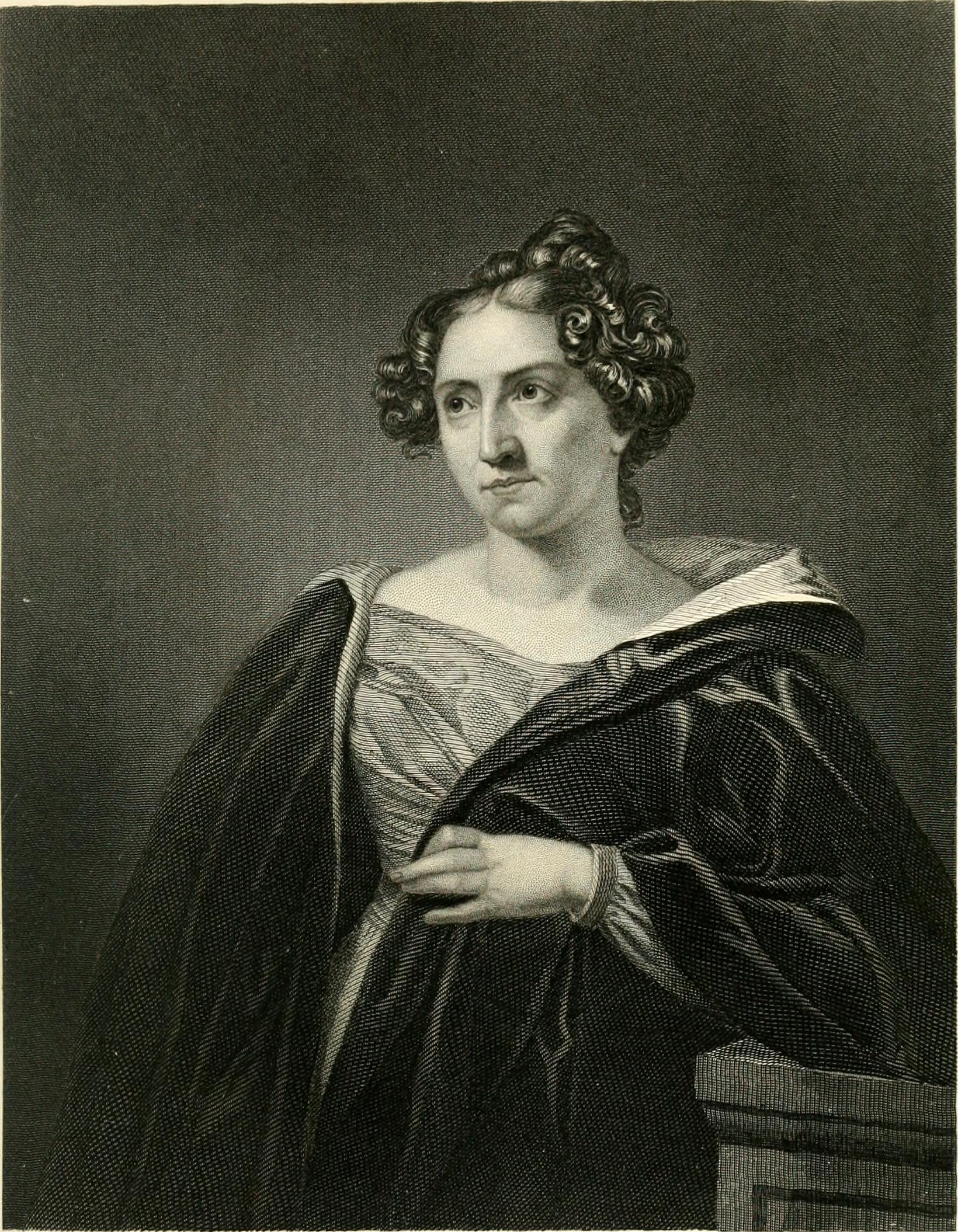

As a young woman, Sedgwick took charge of a school in Lenox. She converted from Calvinism to Unitarianism, which led her to write a pamphlet denouncing religious intolerance. This further inspired her to write her first novel, A New-England Tale. Redwood followed in 1824. It was well received, and caused Sedgwick's name to be associated, and on equal terms, with that of James Fenimore Cooper, who was then at the height of his popularity. In a French translation of the book, Cooper is given on the title-page as the author. Redwood was also translated into the Italian, besides being reprinted in England.

In 1825, Sedgwick published The Travellers, a narrative of a journey made by two very young persons, a brother and sister, with their parents, to Niagara Falls and the northern lakes. On their way, these travelers meet everywhere some incident or some sight, which is made the source of entertainment and instruction. This was the first of Sedgwick's books intended for young persons and the public gave it a ready welcome. Its success encouraged her in after years to write the series of works intended for young readers which became popular.

The reputation of the author was confirmed and extended by the appearance, in 1827, of Hope Leslie, the most decided favourite of all her novels. She wrote other things afterward, that in the opinion of some of the critics are superior to either Redwood or Hope Leslie. But these later writings had to jostle their way among a crowd of competitors, both domestic and foreign. Her earlier works stood alone, and Hope Leslie, especially, became firmly associated in the public mind with the rising form of a native literature. It was not only read with satisfaction but familiarly quoted and applauded as a source of national pride. Her subsequent novels followed at about uniform intervals, Clarence, a Tale of our Own Times appearing in 1830.

Sedgwick gives the Native American population a voice within Hope Leslie through her characterization of various people within the novel. Similar to the manner in which Sedgwick represented a progressive attitude toward the supposed duties of women during the time period, Philip Gura highlights her addition of minority groups as significant characters and her commitment to questioning the history of the nation that has been told exclusively by white men.

A little later, the Brothers Harper conceived the idea of publishing a collection of tales by several well-known authors, and applied to Sedgwick to become one of the contributors. She complied, and two volumes were published in 1832, with the title of Tales of the Glauber Spa. Sedgwick's contribution was a tale of the times of Charlemagne, titled "Le Bossu", in which she skillfully availed herself of the elements of the picturesque to be found in the customs of that warlike age, and the court of that monarch. Then came The Linwoods, or Sixty Years Since in America, in 1835. In 1836, she commenced writing in a new vein, giving a series of illustrations of common life, called The Poor Rich Man, and the Rich Poor Man. These were followed, in 1837, by Live and Let Live, and afterwards by Means and Ends, a Love Token for Children, and Stories for Young Persons. She also published tales in The Token annual gift book around this time.

In 1839, Sedgwick went to Europe, and while there, wrote Letters from Abroad to Kindred at Home. These were collected after her return and published in two volumes. She also wrote a Life of Lucretia M. Davidson, and contributed numerous articles to the Annuals and the Magazines. Some of her publications were prepared expressly for children and young persons. The Boy of Mount Rhigi, published in 1848, was one of a series of tales projected for the purpose of diffusing sentiments of goodness among the young. The titles of some of her other small volumes are Facts and Fancies, Beatitudes and Pleasant Sundays, Morals of Manners, Wilton Harvey, Home, Louisa and her Cousins, and Lessons without Books. In her final novel, Married or Single (1857), she put forth the bold idea that women should not marry if it meant they would lose their self-respect (but she married off her heroine).

In later years, both the brothers who resided in New York City were dead; and her time was divided among her friends in the neighborhood of Boston and those in her native Berkshire. At this time, she wrote Memoir of Joseph Curtis, a Model Man.

== Personal life ==
Sedgwick was engaged at one point to Harmanus Bleecker, a friend of her father and law partner of her brother Theodore (1780-1839). They did not marry, and Sedgwick turned down several other marriage proposals, instead choosing to remain single and focus on her career.

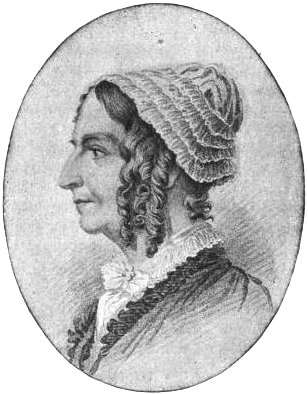
Catharine Sedgwick

Sedgwick died in 1867. She is buried in the family plot in Stockbridge. Her family arranged to have Freeman buried in their family plot as well, and had a tombstone inscribed for her.

== Critical response ==
By the end of the 19th century, she had been relegated to near obscurity. There was a rise of male critics who denigrated women's writing as they worked to create an American literature. Interest in Sedgwick's works and an appreciation of her contribution to American literature has been stimulated by the late 20th century's feminist movement. Beginning in the 1960s, feminist scholars began to re-evaluate women's contributions to literature and other arts and created new frames of reference for considering their work. In addition, the advent of low-cost electronic reproductions, which became available at the end of the 20th century, made Sedgwick and other nineteenth-century authors' work more accessible for study and pleasure. Edgar Allan Poe described Sedgwick in his "The Literati of New York City" (1846).

She is about the medium height, perhaps a little below it. Her forehead is an unusually fine one; nose of a slightly Roman curve; eyes dark and piercing; mouth well-formed and remarkably pleasant in its expression. The portrait in Graham's Magazine is by no means a likeness, and, although the hair is represented as curled, (Miss Sedgwick at present wears a cap—at least, most usually,) gives her the air of being much older than she is.

=== A New England Tale ===
Sedgwick's first publication was A New England Tale. The author informs us in the preface, that the story was commenced as a religious tract, and that it gradually grew in her hands, beyond the proper limits of such a work. Finding this to be the case, she abandoned all design of publication but finished the tale for her own amusement. Once finished, however, the opinions and solicitations of her friends prevailed over her own earnest wishes, and the volume was published in 1822. The original intention of this book led the author to give special prominence to topics of a questionable character for a professed novel, and the unfavourable portraiture which she gives of New England Puritanism, brought some censure upon her. The limited plan of the story did not give the opportunity for the display of that extent and variety of power which appear in some of her later productions. Still, it contains passages of stirring eloquence, as well as of deep tenderness, that compares favourably with her other writings. Perhaps the chief value of A New England Tale was its effect upon the author herself. Its publication broke the ice of diffidence and indifference, and launched her career.

=== Hope Leslie ===
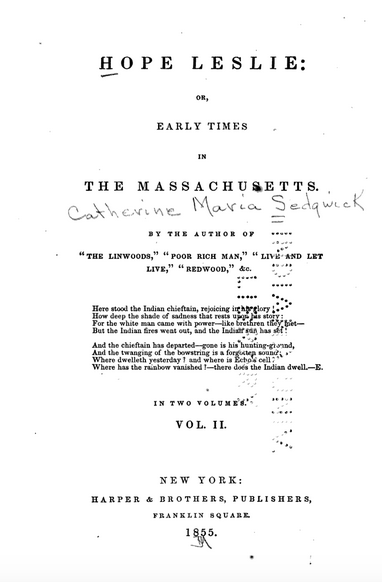
Hope Leslie

Sedgwick's third novel, Hope Leslie (1827), depicted a conflict between white settlers and Native Americans in 1643 New England. The book earned a large readership and established the author's reputation in both the United States and Great Britain.

Using the techniques of the "New Criticism" of the 1950s, Judith Fetterley (1998) provides a close reading of Hope Leslie. She notes both the areas in which the heroine Leslie (and thus the author) is ahead of her time and the areas in which she is a product of her time. Leslie constantly challenges the role of women suggested during the colonial period. Sedgwick portrays Leslie as living in a hostile world, where, as a woman, she creates a holistic public role that is not separate from the private sphere. Sedgwick regularly uses the rhetoric of "sameness" when comparing Leslie and the main male character, Everell.

Her treatment of her characters is both radical and conservative. For instance, Fetterley believes that Leslie is repulsed to discover that her long-lost sister, Faith Leslie, taken captive by Indians, has "gone native", assimilated and married an Indian. Sedgwick portrays the Indian woman Magawisca sympathetically. But she viewed nonwhite women as a threat to the efforts of white women to establish themselves independently in society, and seemed to write nonwhite women out of the future by expressing the contemporary belief that American Indians were a vanishing race.

Barbara Bardes and Suzanne Gossett differ in opinions about the meaning of Hope Leslie. They see the figure of Magawisca as a double for Hope Leslie, and note that the author did research on Mohawk customs and presents their religion sympathetically. Because Sedgwick portrays Faith Leslie's marriage to an Indian and refusal to rejoin the Puritan community, they see her as more open to American-Native American relations than was James Fenimore Cooper, for instance, whose novel Last of the Mohicans (1826) was published the year before.

=== Clarence ===
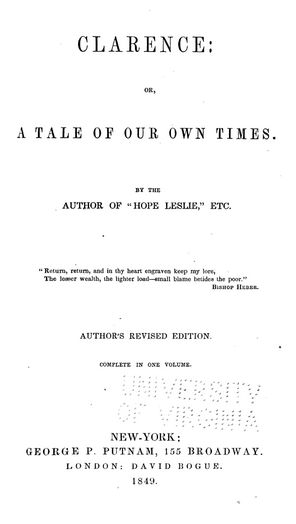
Clarence

Clarence; or, A Tale of Our Own Times (1830) is a novel of manners set in New York City. Portions of the novel also take place in England, Jamaica, and Trenton Falls, a popular tourist destination in New York state. The story follows Gertrude Clarence, a young heiress on the New York City marriage market. An author's revised edition of the novel was released in 1849. Critical reception of the novel in America was mostly positive. A review in the New York Evening Post (14 June 1830) praises the presentations of American domestic life as being "managed with great liveliness and ingenuity, and constitute one of the most attractive parts of the book". Reviews of the novel in England are mixed. The Ladies Museum (1 September 1830) criticizes the novel for being outmoded, complaining that the novel was written "in a style that was considered good fifty years ago".

=== The Linwoods ===
The Linwoods; or Sixty Years Since in America (1835) is a historical romance set during the American Revolution. Sedgwick uses a cosmopolitan framework to shed light on American character and national identity in the early republic by exploring America's relationship with Britain and France. The balance between American nationalism and cosmopolitanism is idealized in the novel through the character of the Marquis de Lafayette, as is the struggle between Old World notions of class and the reality of American democracy.

=== Live and Let Live ===
Live and Let Live

Live and Let Live; or, Domestic Service Illustrated (1837) depicts the ideal workplaces for working-class women to develop domestic skills. Sedgwick's expression of relations between mistress-employer and housekeepers reflects a return to aristocratic class relations, but one that includes employer respect for the employee's humanity and political rights. Domestic economist Catharine Beecher's subsequent publications, A Treatise on Domestic Economy (1841) and The American Woman's Home (1869), similarly promoted the importance of the "labor contract" in these relationships.

== Literary style and themes ==
Hart in 1857 stated:-"The quality of mind which is most apparent in Miss Sedgwick's writings is that of strength. The reader feels at every step that he has to do with a vigorous and active intellect. Another quality, resulting from this possession of power, is the entire absence of affectation of every kind. There is no straining for effect, no mere verbal prettinesses. The discourse proceeds with the utmost simplicity and directness, as though the author were more intent upon what she is saying than how she says it. As a novelist, Sedgwick has for the most part wisely chosen American subjects. The local traditions, scenery, manners, and costume, being thus entirely familiar, she has had greater freedom in the exercise of the creative faculty, on which, after all, real eminence in the art mainly depends. Her characters are conceived with distinctness, and are minutely individual and consistent, while her plot always shows a mind fertile in resources and a happy adaptation of means to ends."

In 1880, in a Harper and brothers review, it was said:-"Sedgwick has marked individuality; she writes with a higher aim than merely to amuse. Indeed, the rare endowments of her mind depend in an unusual degree upon the moral qualities with which they are united for their value. Animated by a cheerful philosophy, and anxious to pour its sunshine into every place where there is lurking care or suffering, she selects for illustration the scenes of everyday experience, paints them with exact fidelity, and seeks to diffuse over the mind a delicious serenity, and in the heart kind feelings and sympathies, and wise ambition and steady hope. Her style is colloquial, picturesque, and marked by a facile grace which is evidently a gift of nature. Her characters are nicely drawn and delicately contrasted, her delineation of manners decidedly the best that has appeared.

== Selected works ==
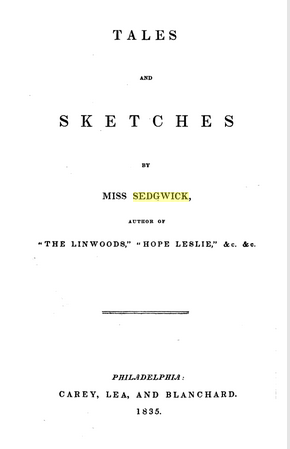
Tales and Sketches

=== Novels ===
- A New-England Tale; Or Sketches of New-England Character and Manners (1822)
- Redwood: A Tale (1824)
- Hope Leslie; or, Early Times in the Massachusetts (1827)
- Clarence; or, A Tale of Our Own Times (1830)
- The Linwoods; or, "Sixty Years Since" in America (1835)
- Home (Boston, 1835)
- The Poor Rich Man, and the Rich Poor Man (New York, 1836)
- Live and Let Live; or, Domestic Service Illustrated (1837) (Note: See Richard Bushman, Refinement in America, 1992, pp. 276–79 for a discussion of Home, The Poor Rich Man, and the Rich Poor Man, and Live and Let Live)
- The Irish Girl, and Other Tales (1850)
- Married or Single? (1857)

=== Children's writing ===
- The Travellers: A Tale Designed for Young People (1825)
- The Deformed Boy (1826)
- Stories for Young Persons (1840)
- Pretty Little Stories for Pretty Little People (1846)
- The Boy of Mount Rhigi. "Do the Duty Nearest to You" (1848)

=== Other writings ===
- Tales and Sketches (1835)
- Letters from Abroad to Kindred at Home, in two volumes (1841)
- Tales and Sketches, Second Series (1844)
- Slavery in New England (Note: In Bentley's Miscellany (1853), based on the experience of her governess and parents' housekeeper, African American ex-slave Elizabeth Freeman (Mum Bett) Sedgwick, Catharine Maria (1853). "Catharine Maria Sedgwick Papers, "Mumbett" (manuscript draft)". Boston, Massachusetts: Massachusetts Historical Society. Archived from the original on June 8, 2011.)
