= Susan Anne Ridley Sedgwick =

American writer

- Born: 24 May 1788; Stockbridge, MA
- Died: 20 January 1867 (aged 78); Stockbridge, MA
- Resting place: The Sedgwick Pie
- Occupation: Author
- Known for: Children's novels

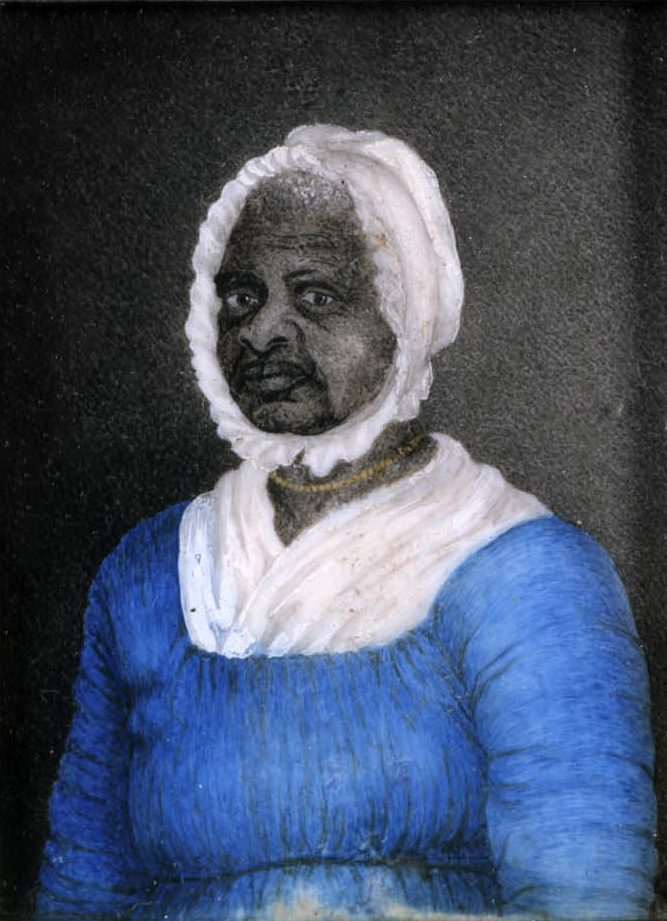
Mum Bett, aka Elizabeth Freeman, aged 70. Painted by Susan Ridley Sedgwick, aged 23. Watercolor on ivory, painted circa 1812.

Susan Anne Ridley Sedgwick (1788–1867) was a 19th-century American writer specializing in children's novels. She also painted a watercolor-on-ivory portrait of an ex-slave who came to work for her family.

Sedgwick was born in Stockbridge, Massachusetts, daughter of Matthew Ridley (1746–1789) and Catherine Livingston (1751–1813), his second wife. Sedgwick's mother, Catherine Livingston, was the daughter of William Livingston, governor of New Jersey. She married Theodore Sedgwick Jr., (1780–1839). Her husband's father, Theodore Sedgwick (1746–1813), was a delegate to Continental Congress, a United States Representative, Speaker of the U.S. House of Representatives, a United States Senator from Massachusetts, and a state supreme court judge. As a lawyer, Sedgwick, Sr. represented Elizabeth ("Mumbet") Freeman, who had been a slave for forty years, and won her freedom. Mumbet came to live as a servant in the Sedgwick household, and Susan Sedgwick painted her portrait (watercolor on ivory).

Sedgwick's sister-in-law was Catharine Sedgwick (1789–1867), also a novelist. Before she married Catharine's brother, Susan was Catharine's schoolmate.

Sedgwick was one of the 139 people buried in the large circular family burial plot in Stockbridge, Massachusetts known as the Sedgwick Pie.

== Works ==
- Sedgwick, Susan Anne Livingston Ridley (1829). The Morals of Pleasure. Philadelphia: Carey, Lea, & Carey. ISBN 9781446032749.
- Sedgwick, Susan Anne Livingston Ridley (1830). The Children's Week. Boston: Carter and Hendee.
- Sedgwick, Susan Anne Livingston Ridley (1830). The Young Emigrants: A Tale Designed for Young Persons. Boston: Carter and Hendee.
- Sedgwick, Susan Anne Livingston Ridley (1834). Allen Prescott; or, The Fortunes of a New England Boy. New York: Harper & Brothers, Publishers.
- Sedgwick, Susan Anne Livingston Ridley (1859). Walter Thornley, or A Peep at the Past. New York: Harper & Brothers, Publishers.
