= Theodore Sedgwick (lawyer) =

American attorney and author

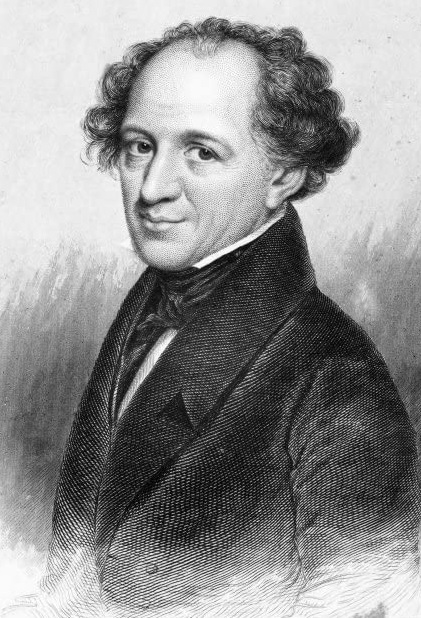
- Engraved circa 1840 by C.C. Ingham and A.L. Dick for the "U.S. Magazine & Democratic Review"

Member of the Massachusetts House of Representatives from Stockbridge
- In office 1824–1831 Serving with Richard P. Morgan (from 1828)
- Preceded by: Isaac Curtis Jr.
- Succeeded by: Sewall Sergeant

Personal details
- Born: December 9, 1780 Sheffield, Massachusetts
- Died: November 7, 1839 (aged 58) Stockbridge, Massachusetts
- Resting place: Stockbridge Cemetery, Stockbridge, Massachusetts
- Party: Democratic
- Spouse: Susan Anne Livingston Ridley (m. 1808-1839, his death)
- Children: 2 (including Theodore Sedgwick III)
- Parent(s): Theodore Sedgwick (1746-1813); Pamela (Dwight) Sedgwick
- Education: Yale College
- Occupation: Attorney; Author

Theodore Sedgwick (December 9, 1780 - November 7, 1839) was an American attorney, writer, and Democratic Party politician. Active in New York and Massachusetts, he served several terms in the Massachusetts House of Representatives (1824 to 1831) and was the party's nominee for the United States House of Representatives in 1834 and 1836, and Lieutenant Governor of Massachusetts in 1839.

== Biography ==
Theodore Sedgwick (sometimes referred to as Theodore Sedgwick Jr. or Theodore Sedgwick II) was born in Sheffield, Massachusetts, on December 9, 1780, a son of Theodore Sedgwick (1746-1813) and Pamela (Dwight) Sedgwick. He received his Bachelor of Arts degree from Yale College in 1798, studied law with his father, and was admitted to the bar in 1801.

Sedgwick practiced law in Albany, New York, as the partner of Harmanus Bleecker. In 1821, he moved to Stockbridge, Massachusetts, where he farmed and authored several legal and political works and biographies. He served as president of the Berkshire County Agricultural Society, and was also active in politics as a Democrat. He represented Stockbridge in the Massachusetts House of Representatives from 1824 to 1831. As a legislator, Sedgwick successfully advocated for a charter allowing creation of the Boston and Albany Railroad, and construction commenced shortly after the end of his term in the state House. Sedgwick was his party's nominee for the United States House of Representatives (1834, 1836) and Lieutenant Governor of Massachusetts (1839).

== Published works ==
Sedgwick advocated for several causes, including abolition of slavery, temperance, and free trade, and authored several works in support of his positions, including 1826's Hints To My Countrymen. Sedgwick also authored a biography of William Livingston, his wife's grandfather, 1833's A Memoir of the Life of William Livingston. In addition, he was the author of 1836-1837's Public and Private Economy (three volumes). He also published several of his speeches, including Addresses to the Berkshire Agricultural Association (1823 and 1830).

== Death and burial ==
Sedgwick suffered a stroke on November 7, 1839, while addressing a Democratic Party meeting in Stockbridge. He died a few hours later and was buried at Stockbridge Cemetery in Stockbridge.

== Family ==
Sedgwick was the brother of author Catharine Sedgwick. On November 28, 1808, he married Susan Anne Livingston Ridley. They were the parents of two children, Theodore Sedgwick III and Maria Banyer Sedgwick (1813-1883).
