= Joseph Dwight =

Brigadier General Joseph Dwight
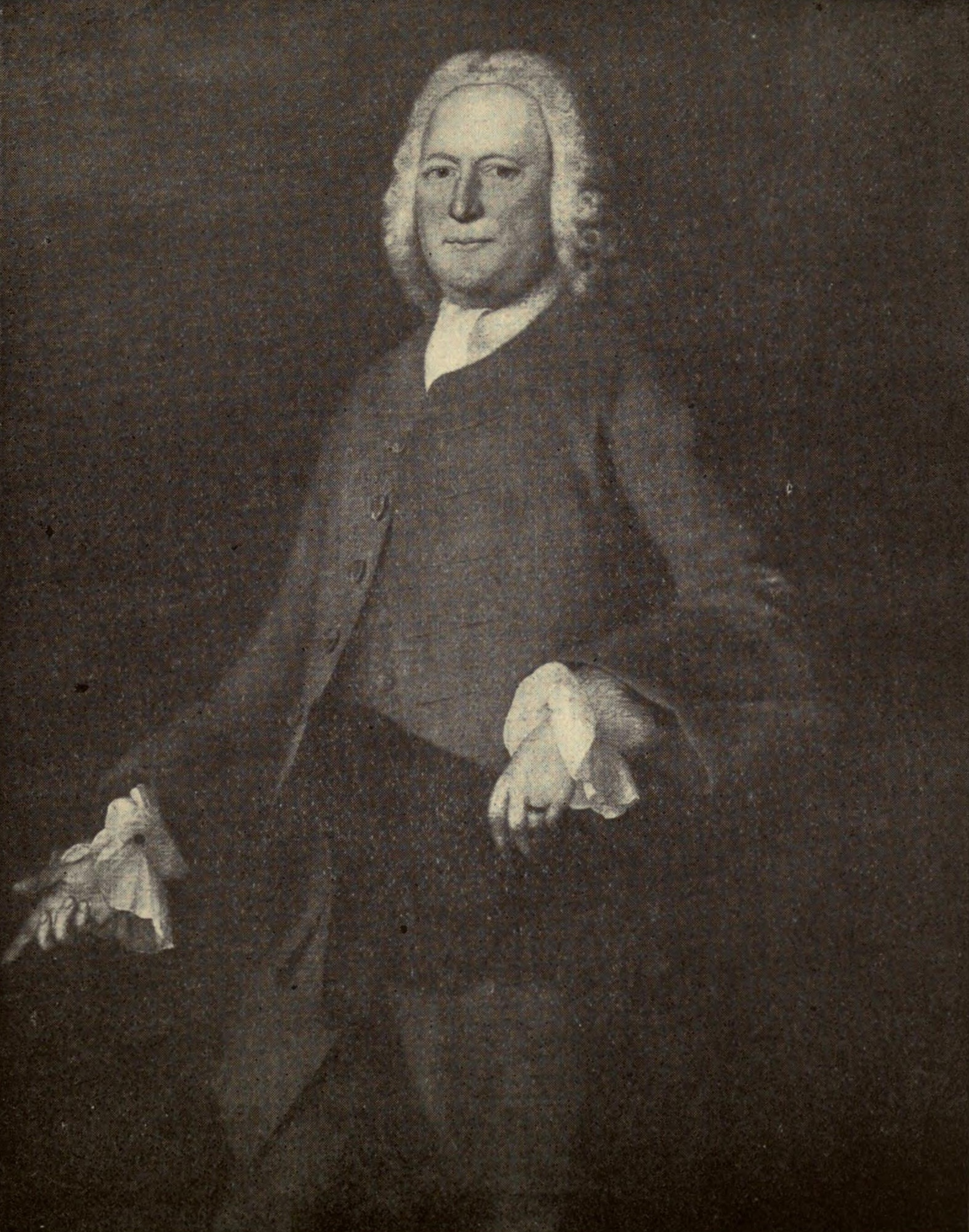
- Portrait by Joseph Blackburn, 1756
- Born: October 16, 1703; Hatfield, Massachusetts
- Died: June 9, 1765 (aged 61)
- Education: Harvard College
- Spouse: Mary Pynchon
- Children: 9
- Military career
- Allegiance: Massachusetts; Great Britain
- Branch: Massachusetts Militia; British Army
- Rank: Brigadier general
- Conflicts: King George's War; Siege of Louisbourg; French and Indian War

Brigadier General Joseph Dwight (October 16, 1703 – June 9, 1765) was a military and civil leader and judge in the British American Province of Massachusetts Bay.

== Life ==
Joseph Dwight was born in Hatfield, Massachusetts on October 16, 1703. He graduated from Harvard College in 1722 and was admitted to the bar in Worcester in 1733. He was the first member of the Worcester Country Bar. He was eleven times a member of the Massachusetts Colonial Council between 1731 and 1751, and its speaker from 1748 to 1749. During this time, he had become a colonel of the militia. He became the brigadier general on 20 February 1745, and was second in command at the attack on Louisburg in that year, where he led, in person, the "Ancient and honorable company of artillery of Boston," General William Pepperrell commended Joseph Dwight for his courage and skill. In 1756, he commanded a brigade of Massachusetts militia, at Lake Champlain, in the French and Indian War.

In 1752, he moved to Stockbridge, Massachusetts, to act as Trustee of "the Indian Schools," a position he held when Jonathan Edwards was also at work there as a missionary (1751-8) to that settlement of whites and Christianized Ingenious. Joseph Dwight remained on the bench as Chief Justice of the Berkshire County Court of Common Pleas until his death.

He married Mary Pynchon and they had nine children. Their daughter Dorothy Dwight married Jedediah Foster (1726–1779). Joseph Dwight built a house at Great Barrington which still stands, and is listed on the National Register of Historic Places. He was one of the leading men when it came to the management of town business, and in giving direction to inhabitants. He died on June 9, 1765. By the time of his death, he was patriarch of a large branch of the New England Dwight family.
