= Boston Brahmin =

Upper class Bostonians

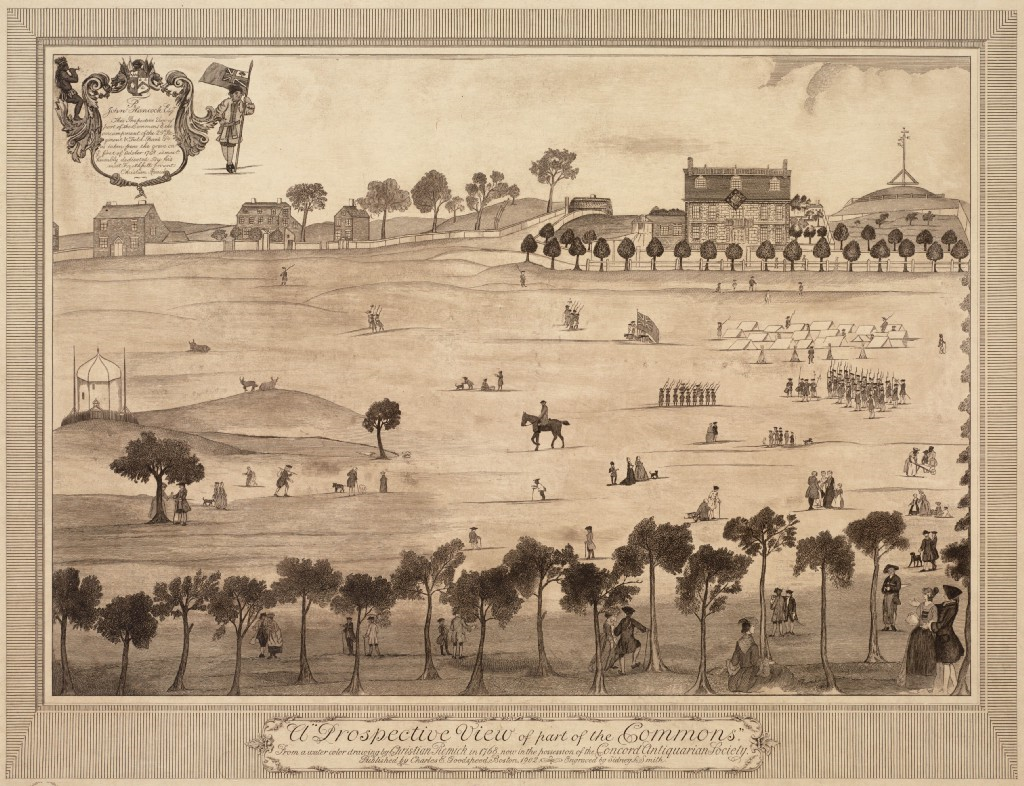
1768 illustration of Boston Common, which was home to several Boston Brahmins.

The Boston Brahmins or New England Brahmin are members of Boston's historic upper class. From the late 19th century through the mid-20th century, they were often associated with a cultivated New England accent, Harvard University, Episcopalianism, and traditional English-American customs and clothing. Descendants of the earliest English colonists who made their fortunes as merchants are typically considered to be the most representative of the Boston Brahmins. They are considered White Anglo-Saxon Protestants (WASPs).

== Etymology ==
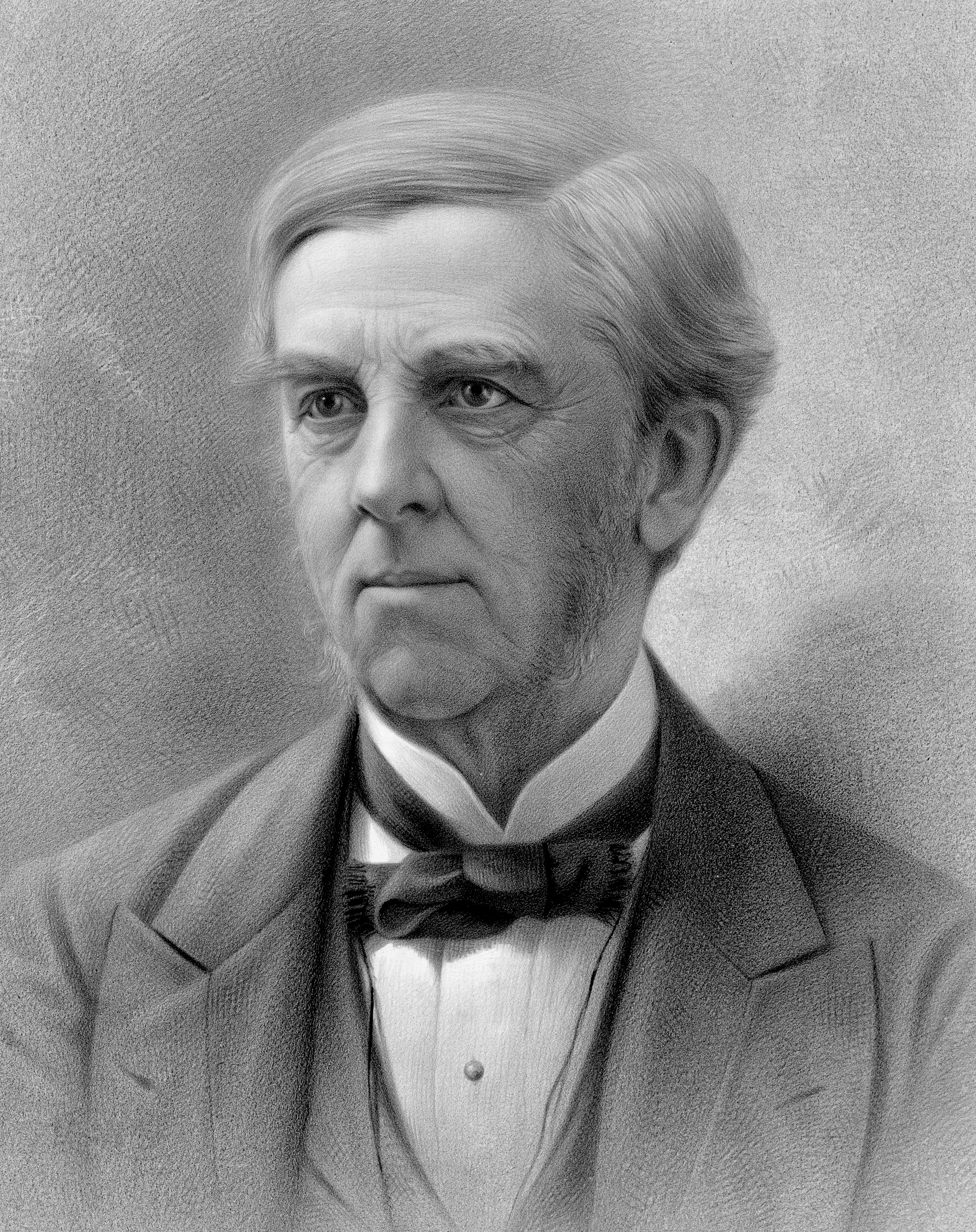
Oliver Wendell Holmes Sr., who coined the phrase "Boston Brahmin" in a January 1860 article he wrote for The Atlantic Monthly

The phrase "Brahmin caste of New England" was coined by Oliver Wendell Holmes Sr., a physician and writer, in a January 1860 article in The Atlantic Monthly. The term is derived from "Brahmin", the priestly and uppermost caste in the Hindu caste system of India.

The appropriated term (Boston Brahmin) became shorthand to refer to the old money, wealthy, affluent and elite Founding Stock Protestant families of New England, which traditionally descended from the first colonial English Puritan settlers, that became influential in the development of American institutions and culture.

The influence of the old American gentry has been reduced in modern times, but some vestiges remain, primarily in the institutions and the ideals that they championed in their heyday.

== Characteristics ==
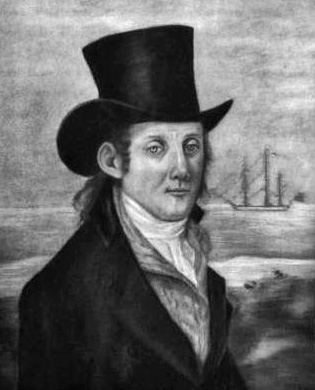
The typical dress of the Boston elite, c. 1816–1817

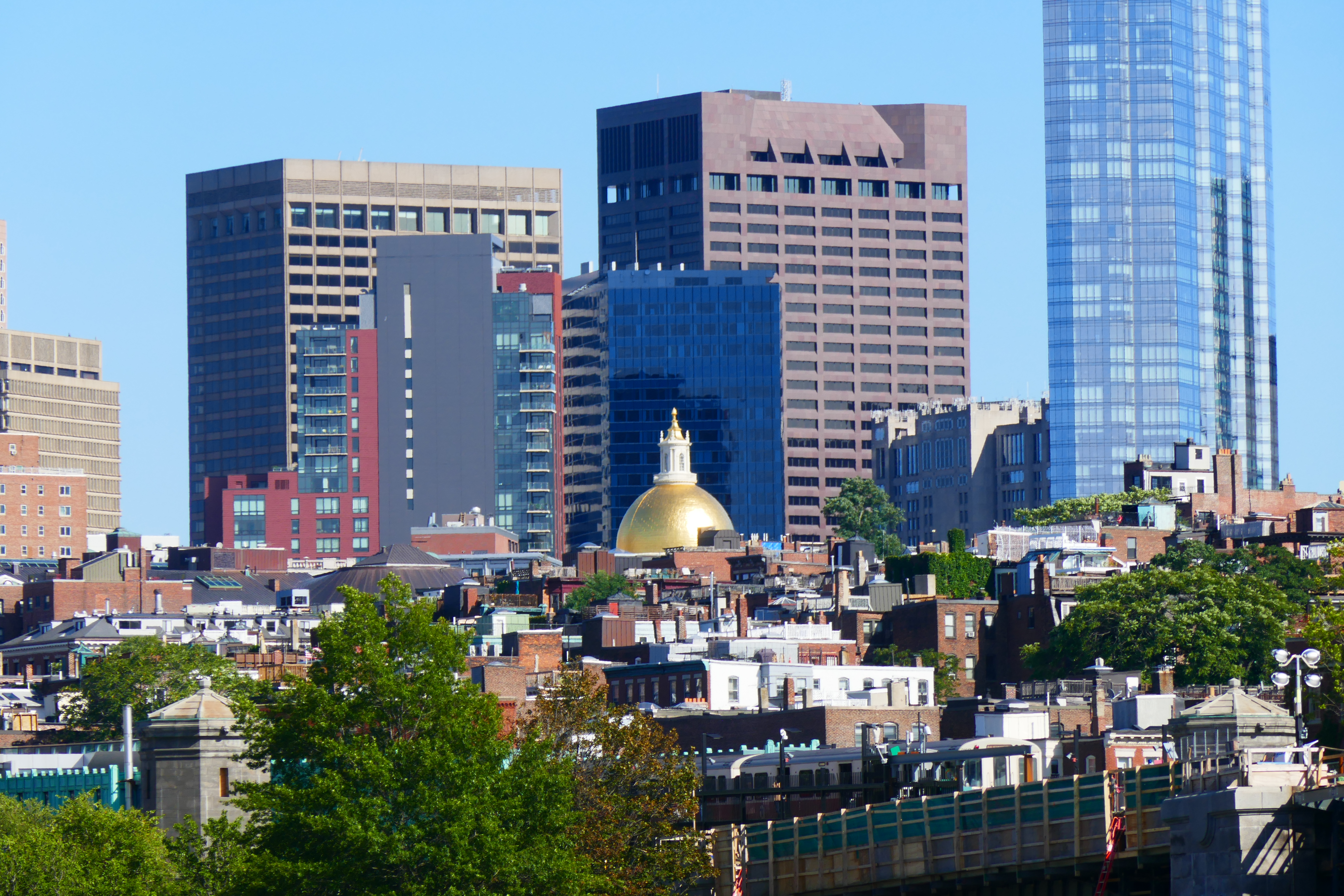
Beacon Hill, a preeminent neighborhood for Boston Brahmin near the Massachusetts State House in Boston

The nature of the Brahmins is described in the doggerel "Boston Toast" by Holy Cross alumnus John Collins Bossidy, first recited at a 1910 alumni dinner in the city:

And this is good old Boston,
The home of the bean and the cod,
Where the Lowells talk only to Cabots,
And the Cabots talk only to God.

Many 19th-century Brahmin families of large fortune were of common origin, having made their wealth as merchants and financiers; fewer were of an aristocratic origin. The new families were often the first to seek, in typically British fashion, suitable marriage alliances with those old aristocratic New England families descended from landowners in England to elevate and cement their social standing. The Winthrops, Dudleys, Saltonstalls, Winslows, and Lymans (descended from English magistrates, gentry, and aristocracy) were, by and large, happy with this arrangement. All of Boston's "Brahmin elite", therefore, maintained the received culture of the old English gentry, including cultivating the personal excellence that they imagined maintained the distinction between gentlemen and freemen, and between ladies and women. They saw it as their duty to maintain what they defined as high standards of excellence, duty, and restraint. Cultivated, urbane, and dignified, a Boston Brahmin was supposed to be the very essence of enlightened aristocracy. The ideal Brahmin was not only wealthy, but displayed what was considered suitable personal virtues and character traits.

The Brahmin were expected to maintain the customary English reserve in dress, manner, and deportment, cultivate the arts, support charities such as hospitals and colleges, and assume the role of community leaders. Although the ideal called on them to transcend commonplace business values, in practice, many found the thrill of economic success quite attractive. The Brahmins warned each other against avarice and insisted upon personal responsibility. Scandal and divorce were unacceptable. This culture was buttressed by the strong extended family ties present in Boston society. Young men attended the same prep schools, colleges, and private clubs, and heirs married heiresses. Family served both as an economic asset and a means of moral restraint.

Most Boston Brahmins belong to the Episcopal church, although some were Congregationalists or Methodists, and to a lesser extent Unitarians. Politically, they were successively Federalists, Whigs, and Republicans. They were marked by their manners and distinctive elocution. Their distinctive Anglo-American manner of dress has been much imitated and is the foundation of the style now informally known as preppy. Many of the Brahmin families trace their ancestry back to the original 17th- and 18th-century colonial ruling class consisting of Massachusetts governors and magistrates, Harvard presidents, distinguished clergy, and fellows of the Royal Society of London, a leading scientific body, while others entered New England aristocratic society during the 19th century with their profits from commerce and trade, often marrying into established Brahmin families.

== List of Boston Brahmin families ==
=== Adams ===
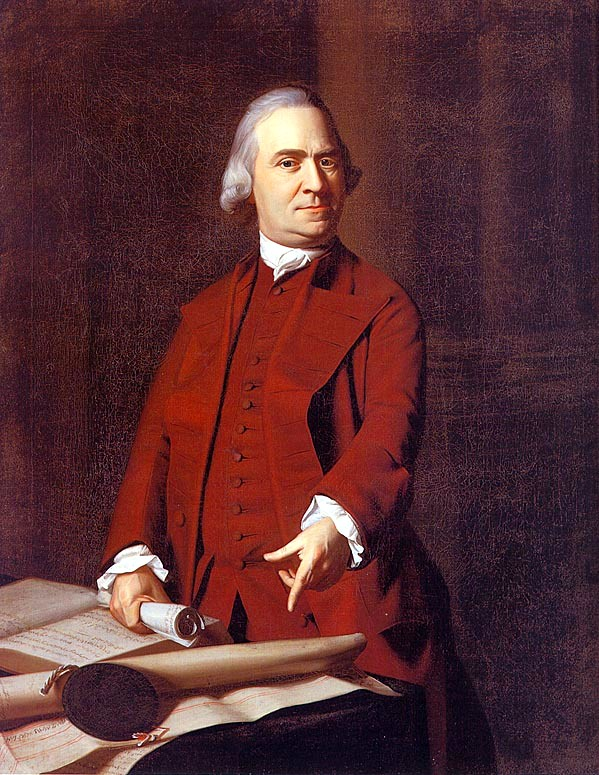
Samuel Adams, American statesman, Massachusetts governor, and Founding Father of the United States

- Samuel Adams (1722–1803), Founding Father; second cousin of:
- John Adams (1735–1826), Founding Father and second President of the United States; husband of Abigail Smith Adams (1744–1818).
  - John Quincy Adams (1767–1848), sixth President of the United States.
    - Charles Francis Adams Sr. (1807–1886), Ambassador, U.S. congressman.
      - Charles Francis Adams Jr. (1835–1915), Civil War general.
      - John Quincy Adams II (1833–1894), lawyer, politician.
        - Charles Francis Adams III (1866–1954), U.S. Secretary of the Navy.
          - Charles Francis Adams IV (1910–1999), industrialist, first president of Raytheon.
            - Timothy Adams, son of Charles Francis Adams IV.
      - Henry Brooks Adams (1838–1918), author.
      - Brooks Adams (1848–1927), historian.
- Ivers Whitney Adams (1838–1914), founder of the oldest continuously playing professional baseball team, the Boston Red Stockings.

=== Amory ===
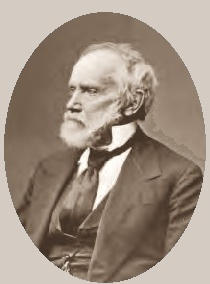
John Amory Lowell, banking merchant

- John Amory Lowell (1798–1881), merchant.
- Thomas Coffin Amory (1812–1889), lawyer, author.
- Thomas Jonathan Coffin Amory (1828–1864), Civil War general.
- Ernest Amory Codman (1869–1940), surgeon.
- Cleveland Amory (1917–1998), author.

=== Appleton ===
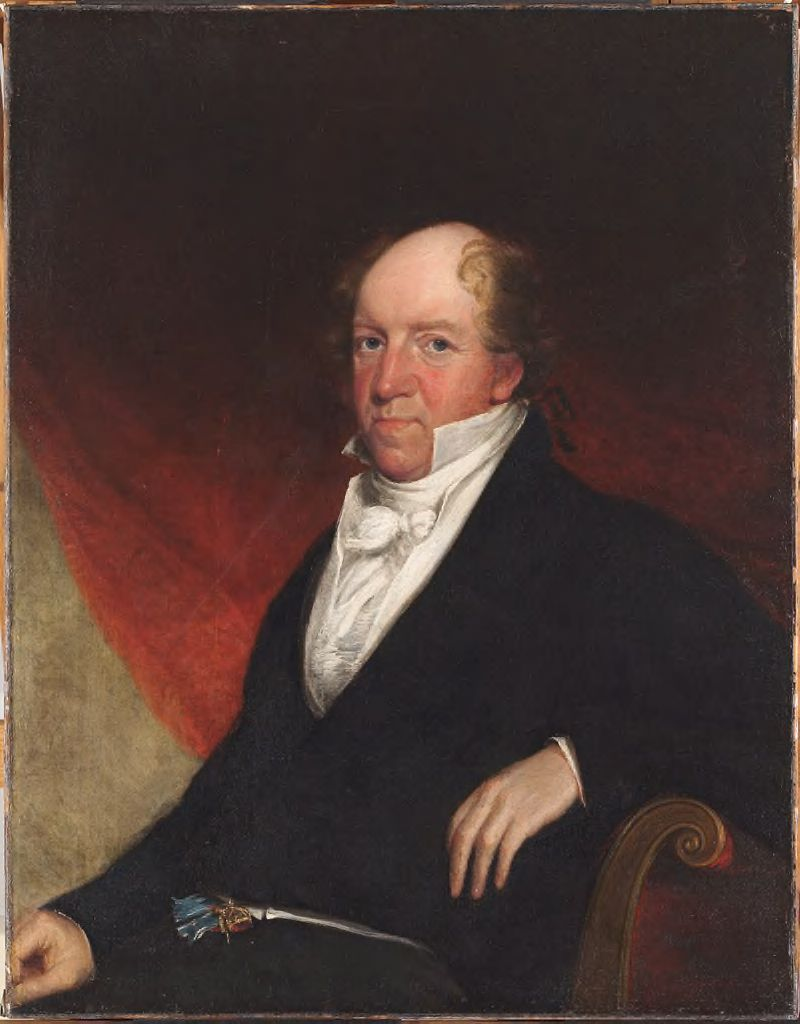
Samuel Appleton, American merchant

Patrilineal line:

- Daniel Appleton (1785–1849), publisher.
- Frances Appleton (died 1861), wife of Henry Wadsworth Longfellow.
- George Swett Appleton (1821–1878), publisher.
- Jane Means Appleton Pierce (1806–1863), wife of U.S. President Franklin Pierce, was First Lady of the United States from 1853 to 1857.
- Jesse Appleton (1772–1819), second president of Bowdoin College
- John Appleton (1816–1864), assistant Secretary of State, diplomat, U.S. congressman.
- John Appleton (judge) (1804–1891), Chief Justice of the Maine Supreme Judicial Court.
- John F. Appleton (1838–1870), lawyer and Union colonel in the American Civil War.
- John James Appleton (1789–1864), ambassador.
- Nathan Appleton (1771–1861), U.S. congressman and merchant.
- Nathaniel Appleton (1693–1784), Congregational minister.
- Samuel Appleton (1625–1696), military and government leader in the Massachusetts Bay Colony and Province of Massachusetts Bay.
- Samuel Appleton (1766–1853), merchant and philanthropist.
- Thomas Gold Appleton (1812–1884), writer and art patron.
- William Appleton (1786–1862), U.S. congressman.
- William Henry Appleton (1814–1899), publisher.
- William Sumner Appleton (1874–1947), philanthropist.

Other notable relatives:

- Thomas Storrow Brown (1803–1888), journalist, writer, orator, and revolutionary in Lower Canada (present-day Quebec).
- Edward Augustus Holyoke (1728–1829), educator and physician.
- Alice Mary Longfellow (1850–1928), philanthropist and preservationist.
- Ernest Wadsworth Longfellow (1845–1921), artist.
- Alpheus Spring Packard (1839–1905), entomologist and paleontologist.
- William Alfred Packard (1830–1909), classical scholar.
- Charles Storrow Williams (1827–1890), railroad executive.
- Edward H. Williams (1824–1899), physician and railroad executive.

=== Bacon ===
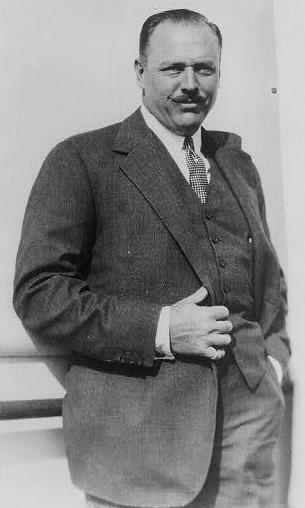
Robert L. Bacon, U.S. Congressman and attorney

- Robert Bacon (1860–1919), U.S. Secretary of State; father of
  - Robert L. Bacon (1884–1938), member of the U.S. House of Representatives from New York.
  - Gaspar G. Bacon (1886–1947), politician; father of
    - Gaspar G. Bacon Jr. (1914–1943), actor.

=== Bates ===
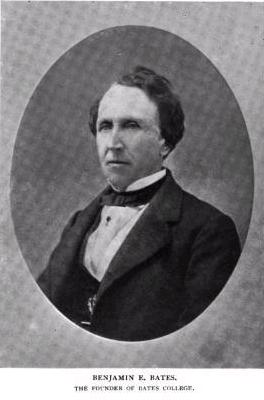
Benjamin Bates, philanthropist, business magnate, and namesake of Bates College

Originally from Boston and Britain:

- Benjamin Bates I (c. 1651–1710), merchant banker, family patriarch.
- Benjamin Bates II (1716 – c. 1820), member of the Hell Fire Club.
- Frederick Bates (1777–1825), politician.
- James Woodson Bates (1788–1846), judge.
- Joshua Bates (financier), Barings Bank partner, managed many Brahmin family fortunes, advised Adams family on Court protocol.
- Edward Bates (1793–1869), U.S. Attorney General.
- Benjamin Bates IV (1808–1878), philanthropist, namesake and benefactor of Bates College.

=== Boylston ===
Boylston Family

- Thomas Boylston (1644–1695), doctor, family patriarch.
- Zabdiel Boylston (1679–1766), physician.
- Ward Nicholas Boylston (1747–1828), benefactor, Harvard University.

=== Bradlee ===
Bradlee Family Direct line:

- Nathan Bradley I, earliest known member born in America, in Dorchester, Boston, Massachusetts, in 1631.
- Samuel Bradlee, constable of Dorchester, Massachusetts.
  - Nathaniel Bradlee, Boston Tea Party participant, member of Massachusetts Charitable Mechanic Association.
  - Josiah Bradlee I, Boston Tea Party participant; m. Hannah Putnam.
    - Josiah Bradlee III (Harvard), m. Alice Crowninshield.
    - Frederick Josiah Bradlee I (Harvard), Director of the Boston Bank.
      - Frederick Josiah Bradlee Jr. (Harvard, 1915), on the first All-American football team at Harvard; m. Josephine de Gersdorff.
        - Frederick Josiah Bradlee III, Broadway actor, author.
        - Benjamin Crowninshield Bradlee (1921–2014) (Harvard, 1942), Chief Executive Editor of The Washington Post.
          - Ben Bradlee Jr. (born 1948), journalist and writer.
  - Joseph Putnam Bradlee (1783–1838), Commander of the New England Guards, chairman of the State Central Committee, Director and then President of the Boston City Council.
  - Samuel Bradlee Jr., lieutenant colonel during the American Revolutionary War.
  - Thomas Bradlee, Boston Tea Party participant; member of Massachusetts Charitable Mechanics Association; Member of the St. Andrews Lodge of Freemasons.
  - David Bradlee, Boston Tea Party participant; Captain in the Continental Army, member of the St. Andrews Lodge of Freemasons.
  - Sarah Bradlee, "Mother of the Boston Tea Party".

=== Brinley ===
Brinley Family of Boston, Newport, Rhode Island, and Shelter Island, New York:

- Francis Brinley, Esq. (1632–1719), arrived from England in 1651 after the English Civil War, with his two sisters, children of Thomas Brinley, auditor to King Charles I&II, his original home became Newport's White Horse Tavern, Judge, book collector, land-owner (RI, MA, NJ), Governor's assistant, m: Hannah Carr (niece of RI Gov. Caleb Carr). Boston estate at Hanover and Elm, current site of Government Center.
  - William Brinley, Esq. (1656–1704), first son of Francis, Judge in Newport, co-founder of Trinity Church, Newport, first Anglican church in RI, disinherited by father after marriage.
    - William Brinley, Esq. (1677–1753), only child of Wm. Brinley, Judge in Monmouth, NJ, passed over for younger cousin Francis Brinley.
      - John Brinley (1713–1775), Brinley grist mill owner in Oakhurst, NJ.
        - William Brinley (1754–1840), Major in Revolutionary War.
          - Sylvester C. Brinley (1816–1905), founded Brinley, Ohio (a.k.a. Brinley Station) in 1855.
  - Thomas Brinley (1661–1693), second son of Francis, Boston/London merchant, co-founder of King's Chapel, Boston, first Anglican church in colonial New England.
    - Eliakim Hutchinson (1711–1775), Judge, Chief Justice of the Court of Common Pleas for Suffolk County, and one of Boston's richest men, owner of Shirley Place (now Shirley-Eustis House) m:Elizabeth Shirley (daughter of MA Gov William Shirley).
    - Colonel Francis Brinley (1690–1765): Colonel in Ancient & Honorable Artillery Company, merchant, land-owner (Datchet House/Brinley Place-Roxbury, Brinley Place-Framingham), one of the richest Bostonians of the 18th century, grandfather's heir, m: Deborah Lyde, granddaughter of Judge Nathaniel Byfield.
      - Francis Brinley Fogg Sr. Esq. (1795–1880), m. Mary Middleton Rutledge of Middleton Place, TN state senator, started Nashville public schools, school board president, namesake Fogg School opened in 1875, a founder of Sewanee University of the South. and Christ Church Cathedral Nashville.
      - Catherine Grace Frances Moody Nevinson Gore (1798–1861), English writer.
      - Francis William Brinley (1796–1859), merchant, mayor of Perth Amboy, NJ, Surveyor of NJ state.
      - Francis Brinley Jr., Esq. (1800–1880), Harvard 1818-Porcellian Club, President of Boston Common Council, MA state legislator (House and Senate), clerk to Secretary of State, Daniel Webster, delegate to state constitutional convention, commander of the Ancient and Honorable Artillery Company.
      - Edward Brinley (1809–1868), Importer for Edward Brinley & Co., Old Faneuil Hall, Boston.
      - George Brinley (1817–1875), noted book collector, pioneer of the Americanist movement.
      - Emily Malbone Morgan (1862–1939), founder of the Colonel Daniel Putnam Association and the Society of the Companions of the Holy Cross.
      - Godfrey Malbone Brinley (1864–1939), top 10 US tennis pro, later master at St. Paul's school.
      - Edward Brinley Faneuil Adams (1871–1922), Harvard 1892/Law 1897, Harvard Law librarian.
      - Daniel Putnam Brinley (1873–1963), artist (painter, muralist, impressionist).
      - Charles Henry Brinley Esq (1825–1907), Judge in AZ, involved in early CA/AZ politics, int'l merchant, appointed Vice Consul to Mexico by Pres Theo. Roosevelt.
        - Charles Brinley (1880–1946), silent actor.
    - Emily Borie Ryerson (1863–1939), Titanic survivor, suffragette, philanthropist.
- Anne Brinley Coddington (1628–1708), third wife of Governor William Coddington, who arrived with the Winthrop fleet in 1630 and became an early MA magistrate, the first Governor of Rhode Island/founder of Portsmouth and Newport, RI, and mother and grandmother of subsequent Governors.
  - William Coddington Jr.(1651–1689), colonial Governor of Rhode Island.
  - Mary Coddington (1654–1693), wife of Gov. Peleg Sanford of RI.
  - William Coddington III (1680–1755), colonial Governor of Rhode Island, merchant, judge, m: Content Arnold.
  - Margaret Sanford Hutchinson (1716–1754), wife of Thomas Hutchinson (governor), last loyalist Gov. of MA.
  - Lucretia Rudolph Garfield (1832–1918), First Lady, wife of 20th U.S. President James A. Garfield.
  - Ted Danson (born 1947), actor, activist.
- Grisell Brinley Sylvester (1635–1687), wife of Nathaniel Sylvester, together they became the first white settlers and owners of all of Shelter Island, NY. She is credited with bringing boxwoods to the colonies.
  - Brinley Sylvester (1690–1752), built Sylvester Manor on Shelter Island, which was made a non-profit educational farm by the 11th generation heir.
  - Charles Ward Apthorp Jr. (1729–1797), owner of Manhattan's Apthorp Farm, merchant, NY Governor's Council 1763–83
  - Sarah Wentworth Apthorp Morton (1759–1846), poet, wife of Perez Morton, MA Speaker and AG.
  - Charles Bulfinch (1763–1844), Harvard 1781/4, architect in Boston and of the US Capitol building.
  - Sen. James Lloyd (1769–1831), Harvard 1787/90, US Senator from MA, merchant, businessman.
  - Franklin Delano Roosevelt (1882–1945), Harvard 1904, 32nd and longest serving President of the United States.
  - Benjamin Crowninshield Bradlee (1921–2014), Harvard 1942, Executive Editor of The Washington Post.

=== Buckingham ===
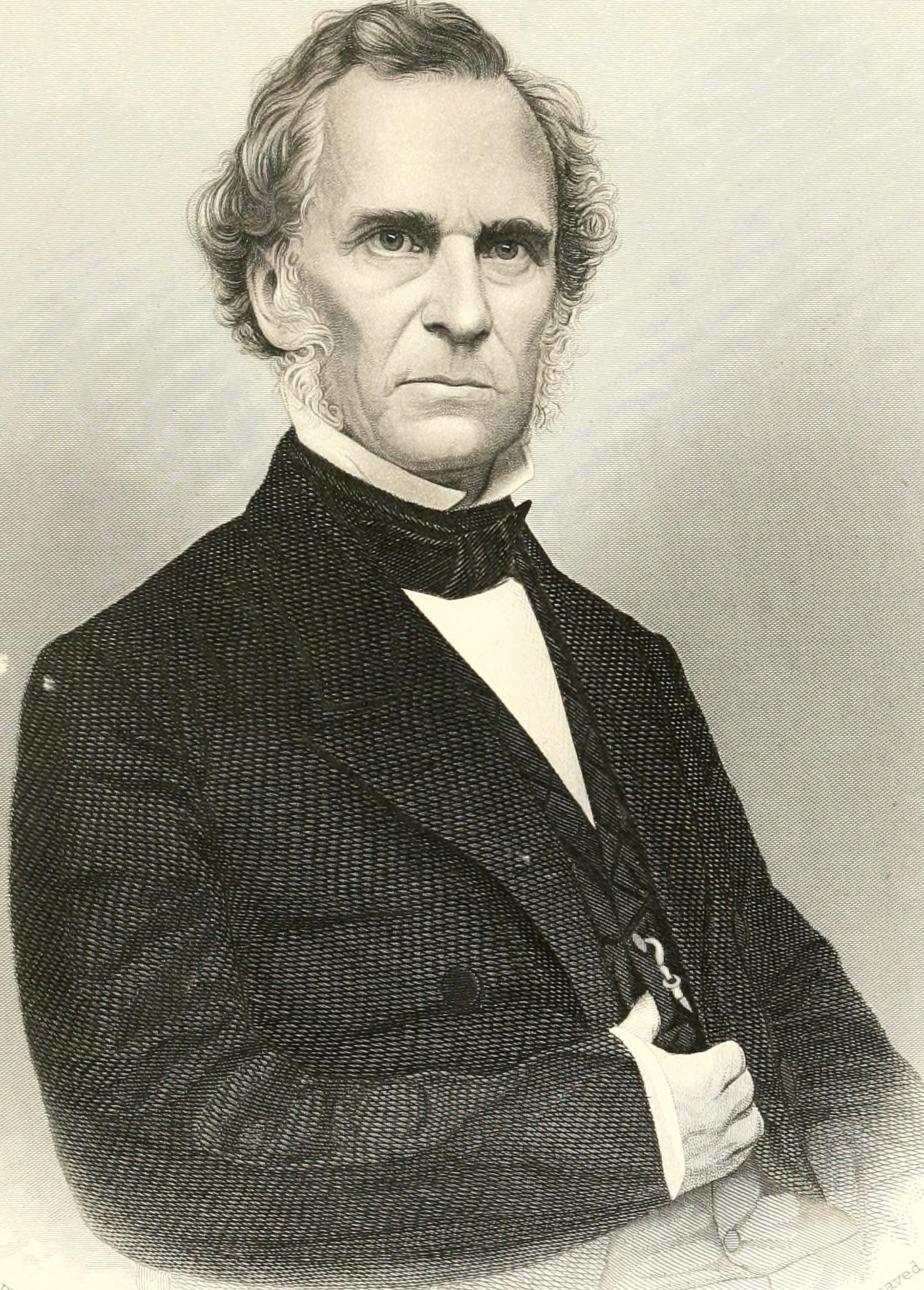
William Alfred Buckingham, American politician, Connecticut governor, and U.S. senator

Originally from Boston and Britain:

- William Alfred Buckingham (1804–1875), Governor of Connecticut, U.S. senator.
- Edgar Buckingham, Harvard scholar creator of the Buckingham π theorem, a key theorem in dimensional analysis.

=== Chaffee/Chafee ===
Originally of Hingham, Massachusetts:

- Thomas Chaffee (1610–1683), businessman and land-owner.
- Jonathon Chaffee (1678–1766), businessman and land-owner.
- Matthew Chaffee (1657–1723), Boston land-owner.
- Adna Romanza Chaffee (1842–1914), U.S. general.
- Adna R. Chaffee Jr. (1884–1941), U.S. general:
- Zechariah Chafee (1885–1957), philosopher, civil libertarian.
- John Chafee (1922–1999), U.S. senator.
- Lincoln Chafee (born 1953), former U.S. senator, former Rhode Island governor, 2016 U.S. presidential candidate for the Democratic party.

=== Choate ===
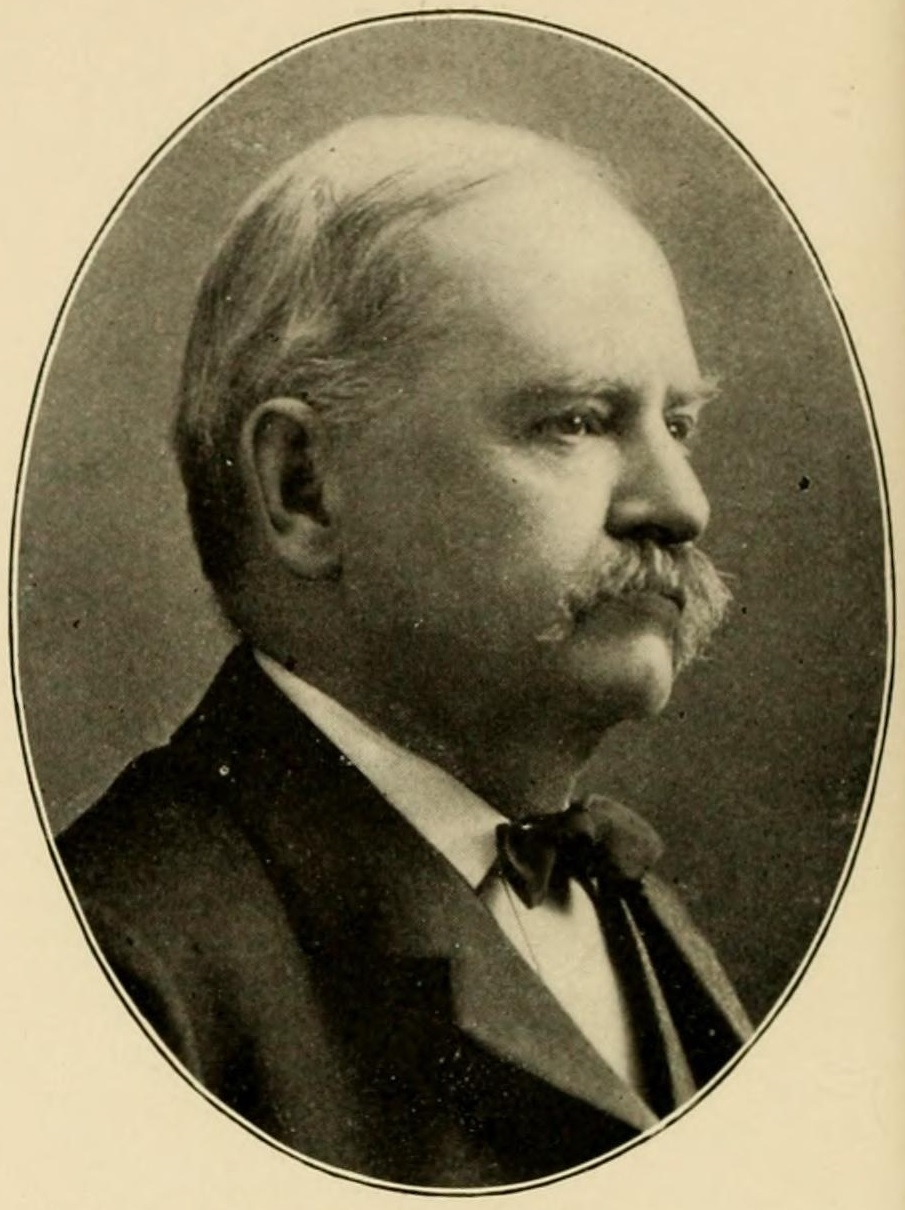
William Gardner Choate, federal judge and founder of Choate Rosemary Hall

- Rufus Choate (1799–1859), U.S. senator
- George C. S. Choate (1827–1896), founder of Choate Sanitarium, Pleasantville, New York
- Joseph Hodges Choate (1832–1917), lawyer, diplomat
- William Gardner Choate (1830–1920), U.S. federal judge, founder of Choate Rosemary Hall
- Sarah Choate Sears (1858–1935), art patron
- Robert B. Choate Jr. (1924–2009), businessman
- Elizabeth Choate Spykman (1896–1965), writer
- Nathaniel Choate (1899–1965), artist, sculptor

=== Coffin ===
Originally of Newbury and Nantucket:

- Tristram Coffin (1604–1681), colonist, original owner of Nantucket
- William Coffin (1699–1775), merchant, co-founder of Trinity Church
- Sir Isaac Coffin (1759–1839), naval officer
- Charles E. Coffin (1841–1912), industrialist, U.S. congressman
- Charles A. Coffin (1844–1926), industrialist, co-founder of General Electric
- Henry Coffin Nevins (1843–1892), industrialist
- John Coffin Jones Sr. (1750–1820), Speaker of the Massachusetts House of Representatives
  - John Coffin Jones Jr. (1796–1861), U.S. Minister to Hawaii
- Thomas Coffin Amory (1812–1889), lawyer, author
- Thomas Jonathan Coffin Amory (1828–1864), Civil War general
- David Coffin (active 1980–present), folk musician

=== Coolidge ===
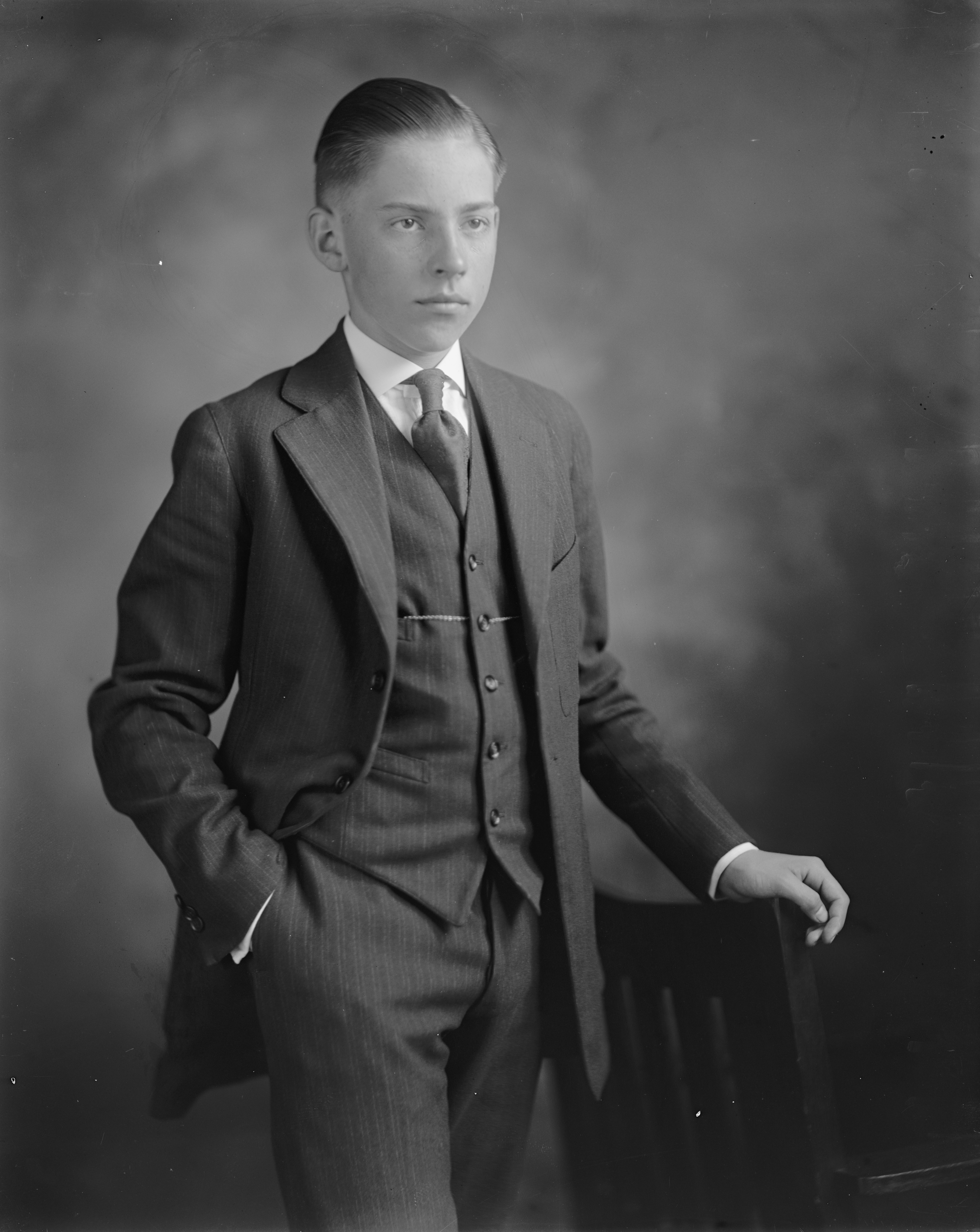
John Coolidge, railroad executive and son of U.S. President Calvin Coolidge

- John Calvin Coolidge Sr. (1845–1926), politician and businessman
  - Calvin Coolidge (1872–1933), 30th President of the United States
    - John Coolidge (1906–2000), businessman and railroad executive
- T. Jefferson Coolidge (1831–1920), Financier, industrialist, and civic leader
- Archibald Cary Coolidge (1866–1928), educator
- John Gardner Coolidge (1863–1936), U.S. ambassador
- Charles A. Coolidge (1844–1926), U.S. Army general

=== Cooper ===
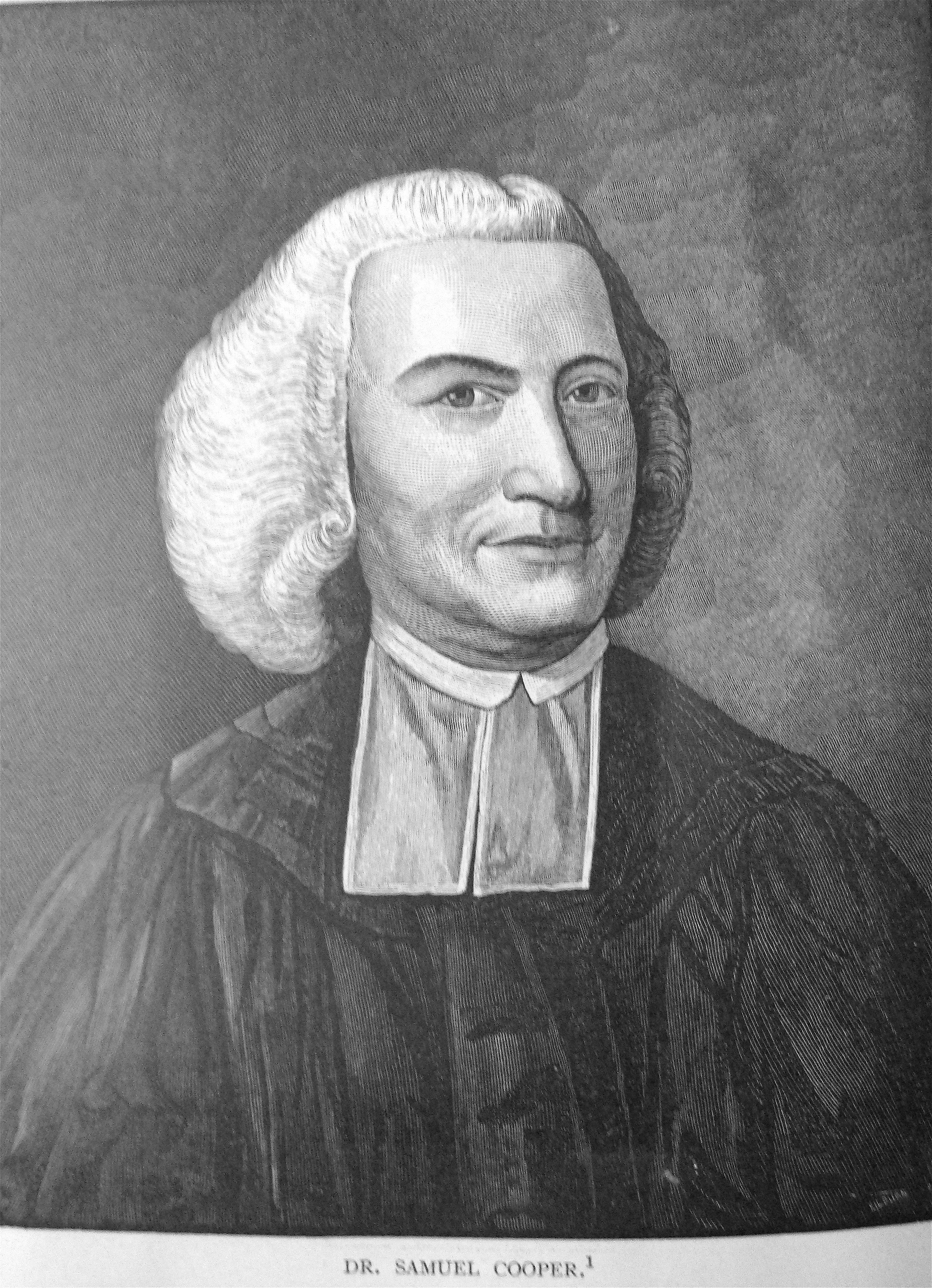
Samuel Cooper, Congregational minister

- John Cooper (1609–1669), colonist
- Samuel Cooper (1725–1783), clergyman
- Samuel D. Cooper Jr. (1750–1824), revolutionary
- Samuel D. Cooper III (1778–1853), trade merchant
- Priscilla Cooper Tyler (1816–1889), First Lady of the United States
- Theodore Cooper (1839–1919), civil engineer
- Frederic Taber Cooper (1864–1937), writer

=== Crowninshield ===
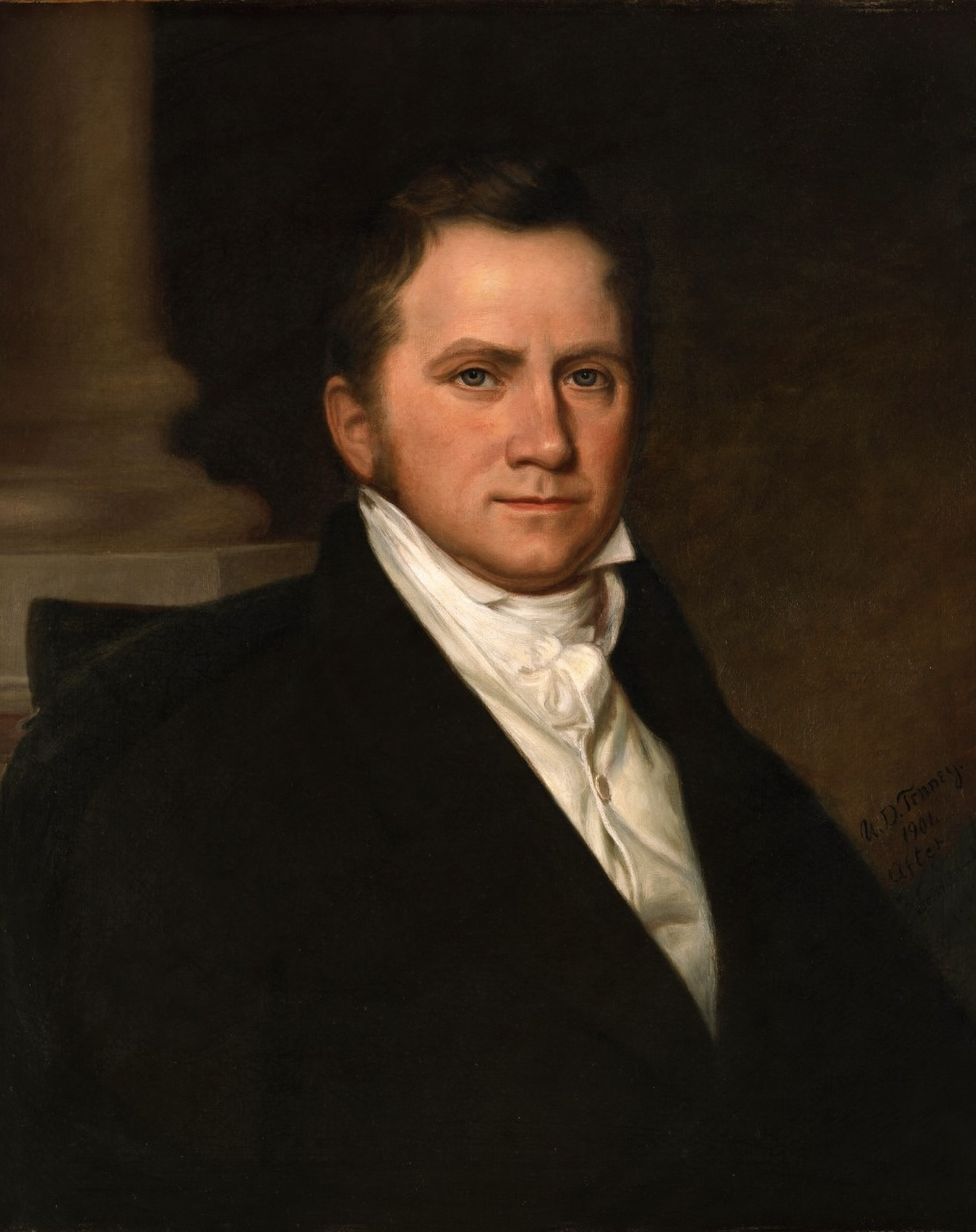
Benjamin Williams Crowninshield, colonist

- Johann Casper Richter von Kronenscheldt, colonist
- Jacob Crowninshield (1770–1808), U.S. congressman
  - Arent S. Crowninshield (1843–1908), U.S. Navy admiral
- Caspar Crowninshield (1837–1897), Union Army colonel
- Benjamin Williams Crowninshield (1837–1892), Union Army colonel
- Frederic Crowninshield (1845–1918), first president of the National Society of Mural Painters
- Benjamin Williams Crowninshield (1772–1851), 5th U.S. Secretary of Navy
- Frank Crowninshield (1872–1947), creator and editor of Vanity Fair
- Bowdoin Bradlee Crowninshield (1867–1948), American naval architect

Descendants by marriage:

- William Crowninshield Endicott (1826–1900), 5th U.S. Secretary of War
- Frederick Josiah Bradlee Jr. (1892–1970), on the first All-American football team (from Harvard)
- Benjamin Crowninshield Bradlee Sr. (1921–2014), Editor-in-chief of The Washington Post
- Benjamin Crowninshield Bradlee Jr. (born 1948), Editor for The Boston Globe
- Josiah Quinn Crowninshield Bradlee (born 1982), author, founder and CEO of IncqludedU.com

=== Cushing ===
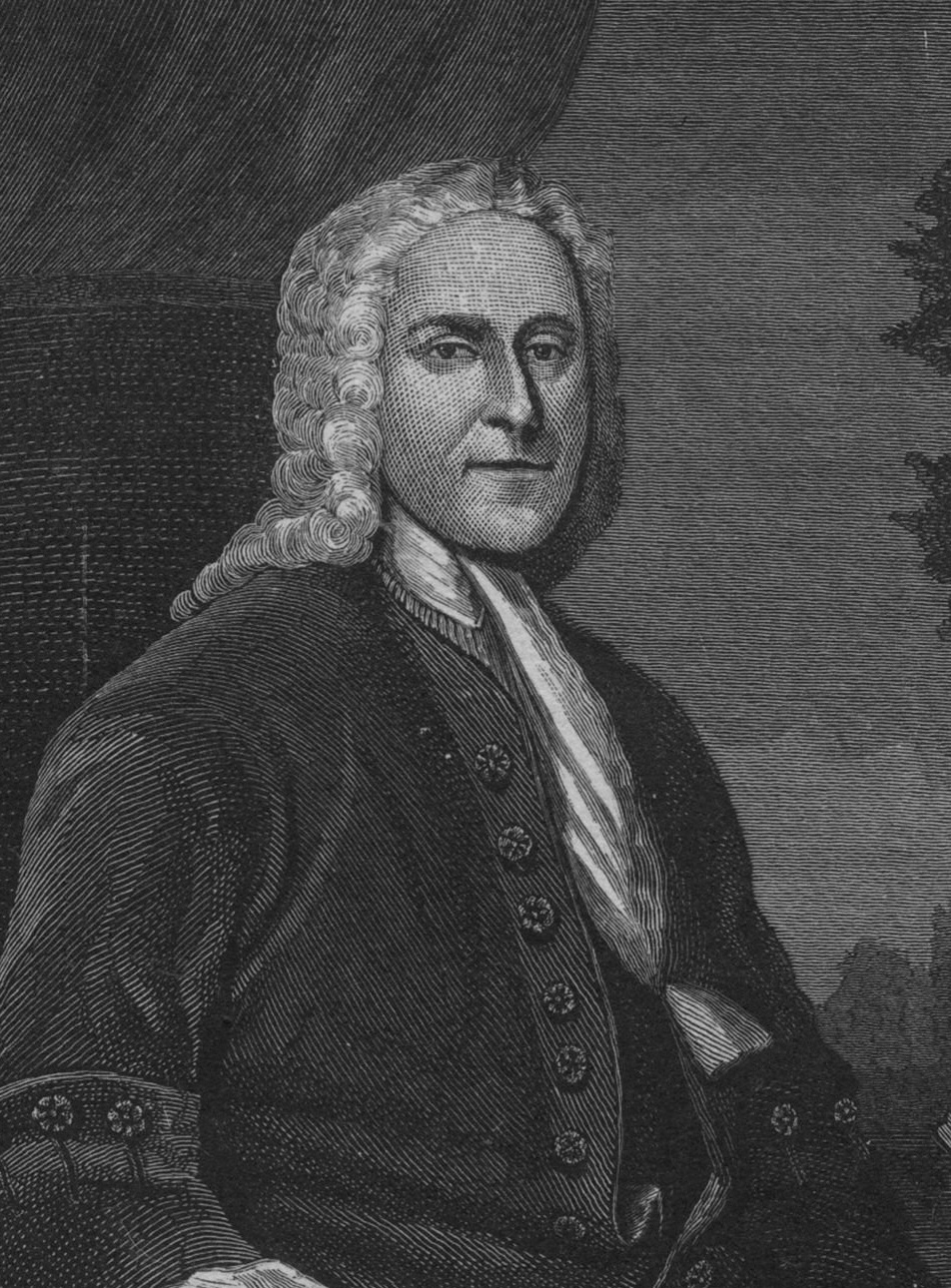
Thomas Cushing, Massachusetts colonial speaker of the house

Originally of Hingham, Massachusetts:

- Caleb Cushing (1800–1879), U.S. congressman and Attorney General
- John Perkins Cushing (1787–1862), China trade merchant, investor
- Thomas Cushing (1725–1788), statesman, revolutionary
- William Cushing (1732–1810), U.S. Supreme Court justice
- Harvey Cushing (1869–1939), neurosurgeon

Descendant by marriage:

- Albert Cushing Read (1887–1967), naval officer

=== Dana ===
Dana Family

- Richard Dana (1699–1772), colonial Boston politician.
- Francis Dana (1743–1811), revolutionary.
- Richard Henry Dana Sr. (1787–1879), lawyer, author.
- Richard Henry Dana Jr. (1815–1882), lawyer, author (Two Years Before the Mast).

=== Delano ===
Delano Family

- Columbus Delano (1809–1896), U.S. Secretary of the Interior
- Jane Delano (1862–1919), founder of the American Red Cross Nursing Service
- Paul Delano (1745–1842), naval officer
- Franklin Delano Roosevelt (1882–1945), President of the United States
- Frederic A. Delano (1863–1953), civic reformer and railroad president

=== Dudley ===
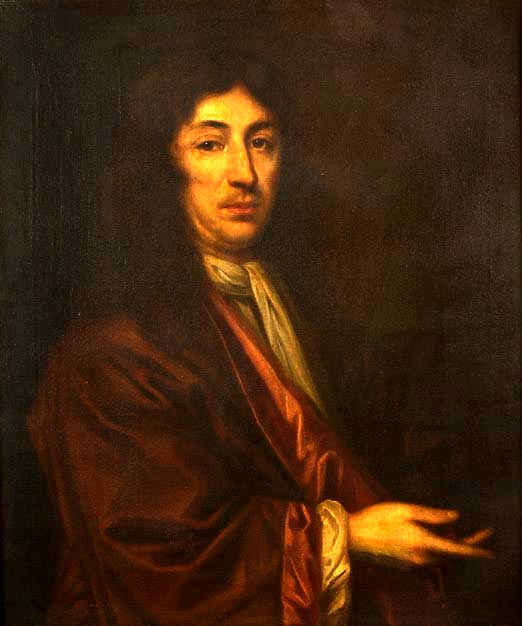
Joseph Dudley, Royal Governor of Massachusetts

Dudley Family

- Gov. Thomas Dudley (1576–1653), Governor of Massachusetts, a founder of Harvard College.
  - Mercy Dudley; m. John Woodbridge (1613–1695)
    - Martha Woodbridge; m. Samuel Ruggles (1659–1716)
      - Rev. Timothy Ruggles (1695–1768); m. Mary White
        - Timothy Ruggles
        - Nathaniel Ruggles (1725 - ); m. Deliverance Barrow
- Anne Dudley Bradstreet (1612–1672), first American poet, wife of Royal Governor Simon Bradstreet.
- Joseph Dudley (1647–1720), Royal Governor of Massachusetts, President of the Dominion of New England, Chief Justice of New York, Member of Parliament, Lt. Governor of the Isle of Wight.
- Paul Dudley (1675–1751), Chief Justice of Massachusetts, member of the Royal Society, founder of the Dudleian lectures at Harvard.
- Paul Dudley Sargent (1745–1828), Army colonel and Revolutionary War hero.
- Dudley Saltonstall (1738–1796), Naval commodore during the Revolution and successful privateer.

=== Dwight ===
Dwight Family

- Timothy Dwight IV (1752–1817), president of Yale University.
- Joseph Dwight (1703–1765), lawyer, French and Indian War veteran.
- James Dwight Dana (1813–1895), geologist.

=== Eliot ===
Eliot Family

- Samuel Eliot (banker) (1739–1820).
- Samuel Atkins Eliot (politician) (1798–1862).
- William Greenleaf Eliot (1811–1887), first president, third chancellor, and one of the founders of Washington University in St. Louis.
- Charles William Eliot (1834–1926), president of Harvard University.
- Charles Eliot (1859–1897), landscape architect.
- Samuel A. Eliot II (1862–1950), president of the American Unitarian Association.
- Samuel Eliot Morison (1887–1976), maritime author.
- Theodore Lyman Eliot (1928–2019), diplomat.
- Charles Eliot Norton (1827–1908), author.
- T. S. Eliot (1888–1965), Nobel Prize-winning poet, playwright, and literary critic.

=== Emerson ===
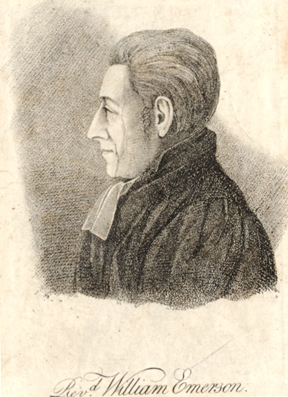
William Emerson, Massachusetts minister

Emerson Family

- Rev. William Emerson (1769–1811), clergyman; m. Ruth Haskins Emerson.
  - Ralph Waldo Emerson (1803–1882), poet; m. Lydia Jackson Emerson.
    - Edward Waldo Emerson, (1844–1930).
      - Raymond Emerson, (1886–1977).

=== Endicott ===
Endicott Family Salem:

- William Crowninshield Endicott (1826–1900), U.S. Secretary of War.

Dedham:

- Augustus Bradford Endicott (1818–1910), politician.
  - Philip Endicott Young (1885–1955), industrialist.
  - Henry Bradford Endicott (1853–1920), industrialist.
    - Henry Wendell Endicott (1880–1954), philanthropist.

=== Everett ===
Everett Family

- Richard Everett (1597–1682), early colonist and native of Holbrook, England. He was a founder of Springfield, Massachusetts, and progenitor of the American Everett family.
- Deac. John Everett (1676–1751), early deacon at the First Church and Parish in Dedham and member of the Massachusetts General Court.
- John Everett (1736–1799), numerous times elected as selectman for Norfolk County, Massachusetts (1770s–1790s) and member of the Massachusetts General Court (1780s–1790s).
- David Everett (1745–1775), revolutionary and killed defending Bunker Hill.
- Moses Everett (1750–1813), judge for Norfolk County, Massachusetts and member of the Massachusetts General Court.
- Rev. Oliver Everett (1752–1802), prominent Congregational minister and judge for Norfolk County, Massachusetts.
- Melatiah Everett (1777–1858), member of the Massachusetts Senate (1812, 1841).
- Horace Everett (1779–1851), member of the Vermont House of Representatives (1819–1820, 1822, 1824, 1834) and the United States House of Representatives from Vermont's 3rd congressional district (1829–1843).
- Ebenezer Everett (1788–1869), long-time Maine state official, trustee of Bowdoin College, member of the Maine Legislature (1840s).
- Alexander Hill Everett (1790–1847), American Ambassador to the Netherlands (1819–1824), Ambassador to Spain (1825), and Ambassador to the Qing Empire (1845–1847).
- Edward Everett (1794–1865), statesman and diplomat. He was a member of the United States House of Representatives from Massachusetts's 4th congressional district (1825–1835), Governor of Massachusetts (1836–1840), Ambassador to Great Britain (1841–1845), President of Harvard University (1846–1848), the United States Secretary of State (1852–1853), and a United States Senator for Massachusetts (1853–1854).
- Horace Everett (1819–1890), a native of Windsor, Vermont, he was a prominent early founder of Council Bluffs, Iowa.
- Henry Sidney Everett (1834–1898), long-time diplomat, Secretary of the American Legation at Berlin (1877–1884).
- William Everett (1839–1910), member of the United States House of Representatives from Massachusetts's 7th congressional district (1893–1895).
- Sidney Brooks Everett (1868–1901), member of the Boston City Council (1892–1894), American Consul to the Dutch East Indies (appointed 1897), and secretary and chargé de affairs to the American Legation in Guatemala (1900–1901).

Descendants through the marriage of Sarah Preston Everett (1796–1866) and noted journalist Nathan Hale (1784–1863):

- Prof. Nathan Hale Jr. (1818–1871), journalist and professor at Union College.
- Lucretia Peabody Hale (1820–1900), author and journalist.
- Edward Everett Hale (1822–1909), famed author and Unitarian minister and theologian.
- Charles Hale (1831–1882), member and later Speaker of the Massachusetts House of Representatives (1855–1859), Consul-General to Egypt (1864–1870), and the United States Assistant Secretary of State (1872–1873).
- Susan Hale (1833–1910), artist and author.
- Ellen Day Hale (1855–1940), artist.
- Prof. Edward Everett Hale Jr. (1863–1932), distinguished and long-time professor at Union College.
- Philip Leslie Hale (1865–1931), artist.
- Nancy Hale (1908–1988), author.

=== Fabens ===
Of Marblehead and Salem:

- William Fabens (1810–1883), lawyer, member of Assembly, Senate.
  - William Chandler Fabens (1843–1903), Lynn attorney, namesake of Fabens Building.
- Samuel Augustus Fabens (1813–1899), master mariner in the East India and California trade.
- Francis Alfred Fabens (1814–1872), mercantile businessman, San Francisco judge, attorney.
- Joseph Warren Fabens (1821–1875), U.S. Consul at Cayenne, businessman, Envoy Extraordinary of the Dominican Republic.
- George Wilson Fabens (1857–1939), attorney, land commissioner and superintendent of Southern Pacific Railroad, namesake of Fabens, Texas.

=== Forbes ===
Forbes Family

- John Murray Forbes (1813–1898), industrialist.
- Edward W. Forbes (1873–1969), Director of the Fogg Art Museum at Harvard University from 1909 to 1944.
- John Forbes Kerry (born 1943), United States Secretary of State (2013–2017), senator from Massachusetts (1985–2013).
- Elliot Forbes (1917–2006), conductor and musicologist.
- Robert Bennet Forbes (1804–1889), sea captain, China merchant, ship owner, writer.
- William Howell Forbes (1837–1896), businessman.
- Beatrice Forbes Manz, professor of history at Tufts University.

=== Gardner ===
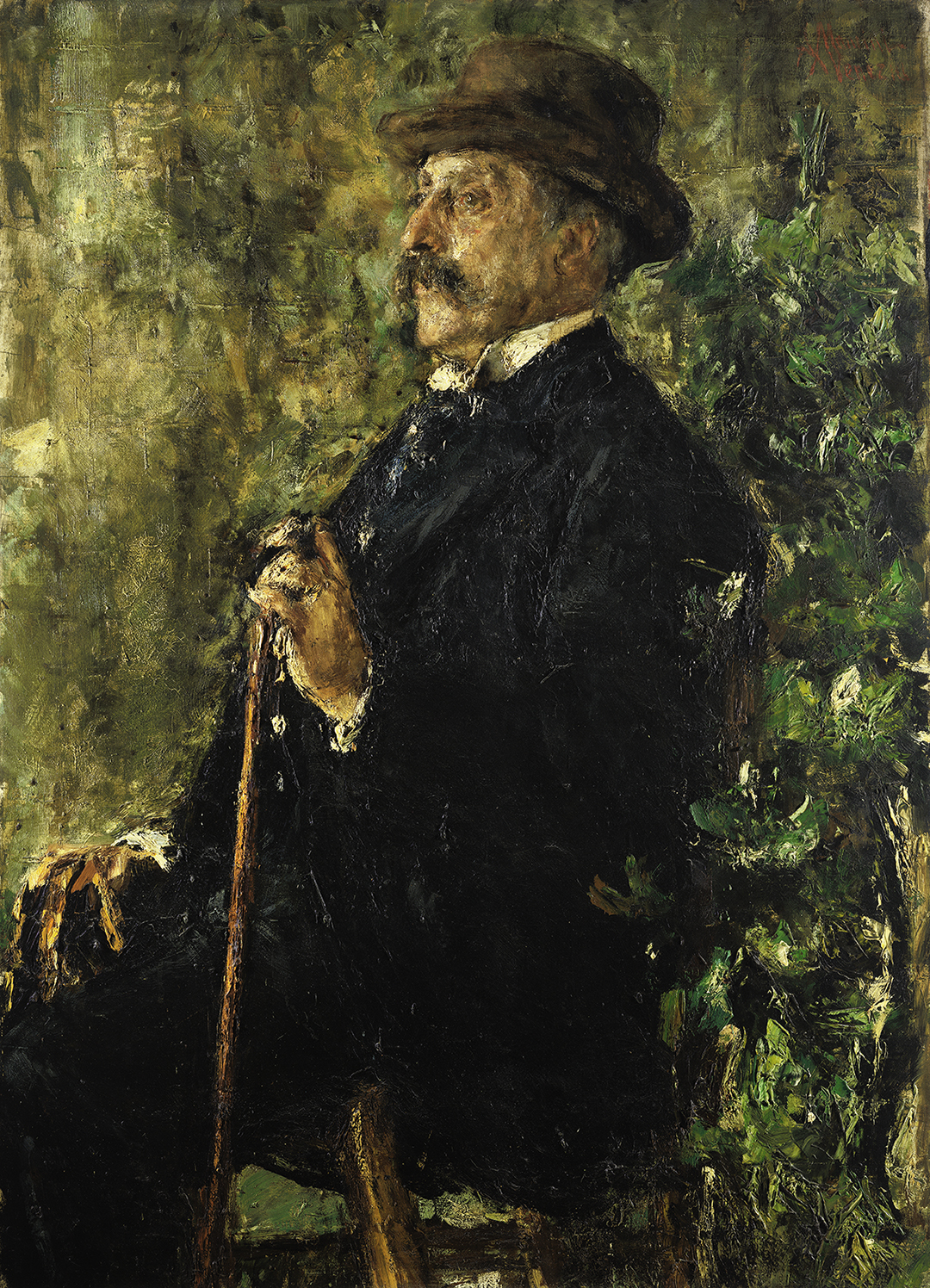
John Lowell Gardner, American businessman and art collector

Gardner Family Originally of Essex county:

- Samuel Pickering Gardner (1767–1843), merchant.
- John Lowell Gardner (1808–1884), merchant.
- John Lowell Gardner II (1837–1898), merchant.
- Augustus P. Gardner (1865–1918), U.S. congressman.
- Isabella Stewart Gardner (1840–1924), art collector, philanthropist, and patron of the arts.
- Isabella Gardner (1915–1981), poet.

=== Gillett ===
- Jonathan Gillett (1609–1677), colonist
- Edward Bates Gillett (1817–1899), attorney
  - Frederick Huntington Gillett (1851–1935), 37th Speaker of the United States House of Representatives
  - Arthur Lincoln Gillett (1859–1938), clergyman
- Ezra Hall Gillett (1823–1875), clergyman and author
  - Charles Ripley Gillett (1855–1948), clergyman

=== Hallowell ===
Hallowell Family

- Ward Nicholas Boylston (1747–1828), merchant and philanthropist
- Norwood Penrose Hallowell (1839–1914), colonel in the 54th Massachusetts regiment
- Norwood Penrose Hallowell Jr. (1875–1961), President of Lee, Higginson & Co.
- Edward Needles Hallowell (1836–1871), An officer in the 54th Massachusetts. He and his brother were collectively portrayed by actor Cary Elwes in his role as Major Cabot Forbes in the Civil War movie Glory.
- John Hallowell (1878–1927), Harvard Football player and assistant to Herbert Hoover in the United States Food Administration during World War I

=== Healey/Dall ===
- Mark Healey (1791–1872), originally of New Hampshire, merchant and first president of the Merchant's Bank
  - Caroline Wells Healey (1822–1912), writer, feminist, and abolitionist
  - Charles Henry Appleton Dall (1816–1886), first Unitarian minister to India
    - William Healey Dall (1845–1912), malacologist, paleontologist, and explorer of Alaska

=== Holmes ===
Holmes Family

- Abiel Holmes (1763–1837), clergyman
  - Oliver Wendell Holmes Sr. (1809–1894), physician, author
    - Oliver Wendell Holmes Jr. (1841–1935), U.S. Supreme Court justice

=== Jackson ===
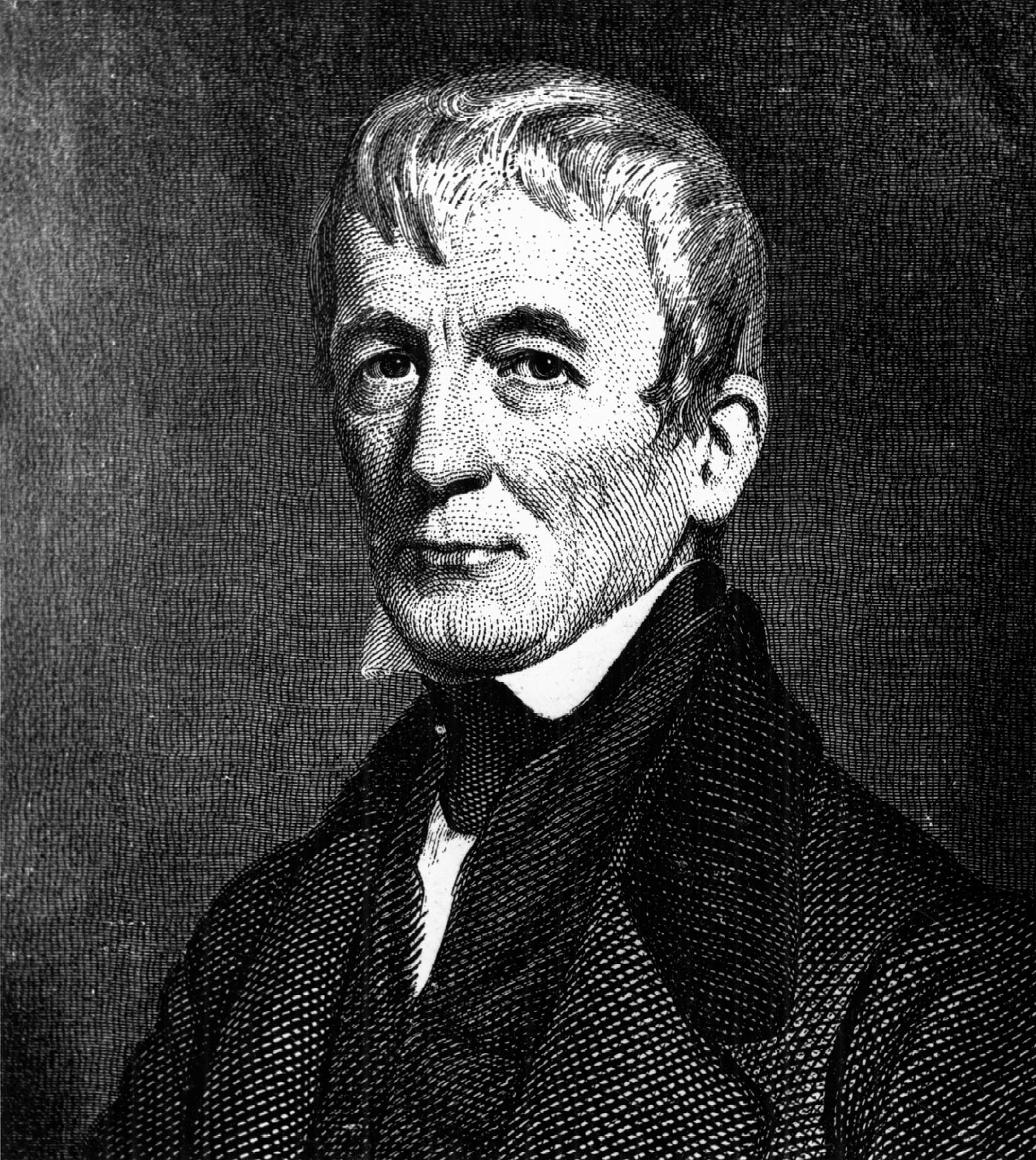
Patrick Tracy Jackson, Boston manufacturer

Jackson Family

- Edward Jackson (1708–1757), colonist; m. Dorothy Quincy Jackson
  - Jonathan Jackson (1743–1810), merchant, revolutionary; m. Hannah Tracy Jackson
    - Charles Jackson (1775–1855), Massachusetts Supreme Court justice
    - James Jackson (1777–1867), Physician m. Elizabeth Cabot
      - Francis Henry Jackson (1815–1873), m. Sarah Ann Boott
        - James Tracy Jackson (1843–1900), m. Rebecca Nelson Borland
          - James Tracy Jackson Jr. (1881–1952), m. Rachel Brooks
            - Francis Gardner Jackson (1914–1970), m. Jane Matthews
              - Francis Gardner Jackson Jr. (born 1943), m. Pamela Graves Hardee
                - Patrick Graves Jackson (born 1969), Surgeon, husband to Ketanji Brown Jackson and related to Oliver Wendell Holmes Jr.
      - Amelia Lee Jackson: wife of Oliver Wendell Holmes Sr.
        - Oliver Wendell Holmes Jr., Associate Justice of the Supreme Court of the United States
    - Patrick Tracy Jackson (1780–1847), co-founder of the Boston Manufacturing Company
    - Hannah Jackson, wife of Francis Cabot Lowell
- Lydia Jackson, wife of Ralph Waldo Emerson
- Greling Jackson

=== Knowles ===
Knowles Family

- Freeman Knowles (1846–1910)
- Horace G. Knowles (1863–1937)
- John Knowles (1926–2001)
- Malcolm Knowles (1913–1997)
- Tony Knowles (politician) (born 1943)
- Warren P. Knowles (1908–1993)
- William Standish Knowles (1917–2012)

=== Lawrence ===
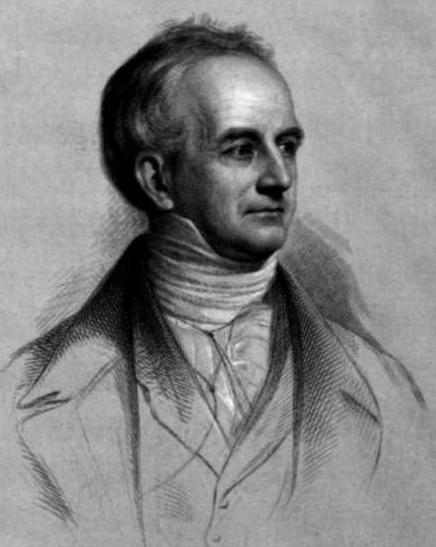
Abbott Lawrence, politician and founder of Lawrence, Massachusetts

Lawrence Family

- Samuel Lawrence (died 1827), revolutionary
  - Amos Lawrence (1786–1852), merchant
    - Amos Adams Lawrence (1814–1886), abolitionist
      - William Lawrence (1850–1941), Episcopal bishop
        - William Appleton Lawrence (1889–1963), Episcopal bishop
        - Frederic C. Lawrence (1899–1989), Episcopal bishop
  - Abbott Lawrence (1792–1855), U.S. congressman, founder of Lawrence, Massachusetts
  - Luther Lawrence (died 1839), politician

Descendant by marriage: Abbott Lawrence Lowell (1856–1943), president of Harvard University

=== Lodge ===
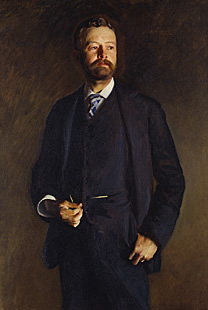
Henry Cabot Lodge, American statesmen and congressman

Lodge Family

- John Ellerton Lodge, husband of Anna Cabot
  - Henry Cabot Lodge (1850–1924), U.S. senator
    - George Cabot Lodge (1873–1909), poet
      - Henry Cabot Lodge Jr. (1902–1985), U.S. senator, U.S. Ambassador to the United Nations
        - George Cabot Lodge II (1927–2026), Harvard Business School professor, 1962 U.S. Senate candidate from Massachusetts against Edward M. Kennedy
        - Henry Sears Lodge (1930–2017)
      - John Davis Lodge (1903–1985), 79th governor of Connecticut, U.S. ambassador
        - Lily Lodge (1930–2021)

=== Lowell ===
- John Lowell (1743–1802), Member of the Continental Congress and Federal Judge
  - John Lowell (1769–1840), lawyer and Federalist
    - John Amory Lowell (1798–1881), industrialist, philanthropist
      - John Lowell (1824–1897), Federal Judge
        - John Lowell (1856–1922), lawyer
          - Mary Emlen Lowell (1884–1975), Countess of Berkeley, m. Earl of Berkeley
          - Ralph Lowell (1890–1978), philanthropist, founder of WGBH
          - Olivia Lowell (1898–1977), m. Augustus Thorndike (1896–1986)
        - James Lowell (1869–1933), Federal Judge
      - Augustus Lowell (1830–1900), industrialist, philanthropist
        - Percival Lowell (1855–1916), famous astronomer
        - Abbott Lawrence Lowell (1856–1943), President of Harvard University, 1909–1933
        - Elizabeth Lowell (1862–1935), m. William Lowell Putnam (see below)
          - Katherine Putnam (1890–1983), m. Harvey Bundy (1888–1963)
            - William Bundy (1917–2000), foreign affairs advisor to John F. Kennedy and Lyndon Johnson
            - McGeorge Bundy (1919–1996), U.S. National Security Advisor
            - Katharine Lawrence Bundy (1923–2014), m. Hugh Auchincloss Jr. (1915–1998), 1st cousin once removed of Hugh D. Auchincloss
              - Hugh Auchincloss III (born 1949), m. Laurie Hollis Glimcher (born 1951), divorced; daughter of Melvin J. Glimcher
                - Jake Auchincloss (born 1988), Captain in United States Marines, City of Newton, Massachusetts Councilman (2015–2020), United States Congressman for Massachusetts (2021–present)
          - Roger Putnam (1893–1972), Mayor of Springfield, Director of the Economic Stability Administration (ESA)
        - Amy Lowell (1874–1925), Pulitzer Prize-winning poet
  - Francis Cabot Lowell (1775–1817), founder of the Industrial Revolution in the United States
    - John Lowell Jr. (1799–1836), Founder of the Lowell Institute
    - Francis Cabot Lowell Jr. (1803–1874), industrialist
      - George Gardner Lowell (1830–1885)
        - Francis Cabot Lowell (1855–1911), Federal Judge
      - Edward Jackson Lowell (1845–1894), historian
        - Guy Lowell (1870–1927), architect
  - Rebecca Russell Lowell (1779–1853), m. Samuel Pickering Gardner (1767–1843)
    - John Lowell Gardner (1804–1884)
      - John Lowell Gardner (1837–1898), m. Isabella Stewart (1840–1924)
  - Charles Lowell (1782–1861), Unitarian minister
    - Charles Russell Lowell (1807–1870)
      - Charles Russell Lowell Jr. (1835–1864), Civil War general, m. Josephine Shaw
      - Harriet Lowell (1836–1920), m. George Putnam (1834–1917)
        - William Lowell Putnam (1861–1923), lawyer and banker, m. Elizabeth Lowell (see above)
    - Mary Traill Spence Lowell Putnam (1810–1898), author, translator
    - Robert Traill Spence Lowell (1816–1891)
      - Robert T.S. Lowell (1860–1887)
        - Robert T.S. Lowell (1887–1950), naval officer
          - Robert Lowell (1917–1977), Pulitzer Prize–winning poet
    - James Russell Lowell (1819–1891), American Romantic poet, Ambassador to Spain and England

=== Lyman ===
- Theodore Lyman I (1753–1839), China trade merchant, commissioned Samuel McIntire to build one of New England's finest country houses, The Vale
- Theodore Lyman II (1792–1849), brigadier general of militia, Massachusetts state representative, mayor of Boston
- Theodore Lyman III (1833–1897), natural scientist, aide-de-camp to Major General Meade during the American Civil War, and United States congressman from Massachusetts
- Theodore Lyman IV (1874–1954), director of Jefferson Physics Lab, Harvard. The Lyman series of spectral lines, the crater Lyman on the far side of the Moon, and the Lyman Physics Building at Harvard are named after him.

=== Minot ===
Minot Family

- Charles Sedgwick Minot (1852–1914), anatomist
- George Richards Minot (1885–1950), winner of the Nobel Prize in Medicine
- Henry Davis Minot (1859–1890), ornithologist
- Susan Minot (born 1956), author
- Alexandria Minot (born 1981), lawyer, human rights activist

=== Norcross ===
Norcross family Original from Watertown, Massachusetts

- Otis Norcross (1811–1882), mayor of Boston
- Amasa Norcross (1824–1898), politician
- Eleanor Norcross (1854–1923), artist

=== Oakes ===
Oakes family

- Urian Oakes (1631–1681), minister and educator; president of Harvard College.

=== Otis ===
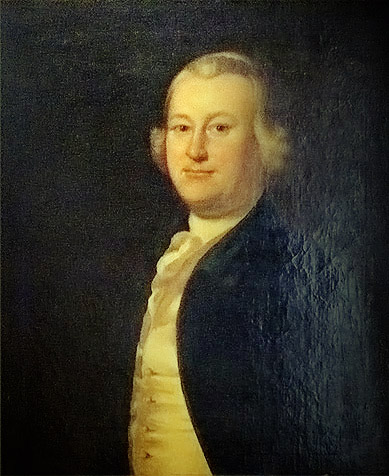
James Otis, colonial lawyer

Otis family

- James Otis Jr. (1725–1783), revolutionary
- Mercy Otis Warren (1728–1814), playwright, revolutionary
- Samuel Allyne Otis (1740–1814), politician
- Harrison Gray Otis (1765–1848), U.S. senator, mayor of Boston

=== Paine ===
Paine Family

- Robert Treat Paine (1731–1814), lawyer, politician, and a Founding Father of the United States who signed the Continental Association and the Declaration of Independence.
- Robert Treat Paine Jr. (1773–1811), a poet and editor
- Charles Jackson Paine (1833–1916), railroad executive, yachtsman, and general in the Union Army during the American Civil War.
- Robert Treat Paine (philanthropist) (1835–1910), lawyer, philanthropist, and social reformer
- Sumner Paine (1868–1904), American shooter who competed at the 1896 Summer Olympics.
- John Paine (sport shooter) (1870–1951), American shooter who competed at the 1896 Summer Olympics.
- Lyman Paine (1901–1978), architect and far-left activist.
- Robert Treat Paine Storer (1893–1962), All-American football player for Harvard University and decorated veteran of World War I.
- Robert T. Paine (zoologist) (1933–2016), the ecologist who coined the term "keystone species".
- Michael Paine (1928–2018), an acquaintance of Lee Harvey Oswald, unknown to Paine and his wife Oswald had been hiding his Carcano Model 38 infantry carbine rifle in the garage of their Irving, Texas home, that was used to kill President John F. Kennedy, and wound Texas Governor John Connally on November 22, 1963, and used beforehand in a failed attempt on the life of far-right activist, resigned Army General, Edwin Walker, in April of that year.
- Ruth Paine (1932–2025) friend of Marina Oswald, who was living with her at the time of the assassination of President Kennedy.

=== Palfrey ===
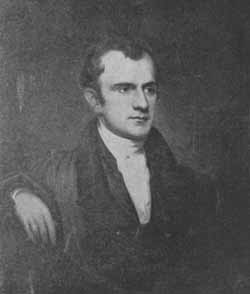
John G. Palfrey I, leader in founding Harvard Divinity School, U.S. Congressman, and Unitarian minister

Palfrey Family

- Peter Palfrey (1611–1663), one of the founders of Salem, Salem representative to the first General Court of Massachusetts Bay Colony
- William Palfrey (1741–1780), American patriot, Aide-de-camp to George Washington, chief clerk to John Hancock, successful merchant
- John G. Palfrey I (1796–1881), played a leading role in the creation of Harvard Divinity School, first Dean of Harvard Divinity School, U.S. Congressman from Massachusetts, Unitarian minister, historian
- Francis Winthrop Palfrey (1831–1889), historian, decorated Union officer
- Sarah Palfrey Danzig (1912–1996), won 18 national tennis championship titles (singles, doubles, mixed doubles)
- John G. Palfrey V (1919–1979), member of President Kennedy's Atomic Energy Commission, Dean of Columbia University
- John G. "Sean" Palfrey VI (born 1945), pediatrician and advocate, Harvard Faculty Dean of Adams House with Judy Palfrey
- John G. Palfrey VII (born 1972), educator and author, historian, Headmaster of Phillips Academy

=== Parkman ===
Parkman Family

- Samuel Parkman (1751–1824), investor; father of
  - George Parkman, physician, investor, philanthropist; victim in the Parkman–Webster murder case
- Francis Parkman Jr., historian; grandson of Samuel Parkman; nephew of George Parkman

=== Peabody ===
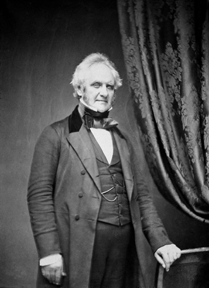
George Peabody, entrepreneur, philanthropist, and founder of the House of Morgan and the Peabody Institute

Peabody Family

- Elizabeth Palmer Peabody (1804–1894), American educator who opened the first English-language kindergarten in the United States
- Endicott Peabody (1857–1944), Episcopal priest, founder of the Groton School for Boys
- Endicott "Chubb" Peabody (1920–1997), governor of Massachusetts
- George Peabody (1795–1869), entrepreneur, philanthropist who founded the House of Morgan and the Peabody Institute
- Joseph Peabody (1757–1844), merchant, shipowner, philanthropist whose company sailed clipper ships in the Old China Trade from its base in Salem, Massachusetts
- Mary Tyler Peabody Mann (1806–1887), American author, wife of education reformer Horace Mann
- Nathaniel Peabody (1774–1855)
- Richard R. Peabody (1892–1936), author of The Common Sense of Drinking, a major influence on Alcoholics Anonymous founder Bill Wilson
- Sophia Amelia Peabody Hawthorne (1809–1871), painter, illustrator, wife of American author Nathaniel Hawthorne

=== Perkins ===
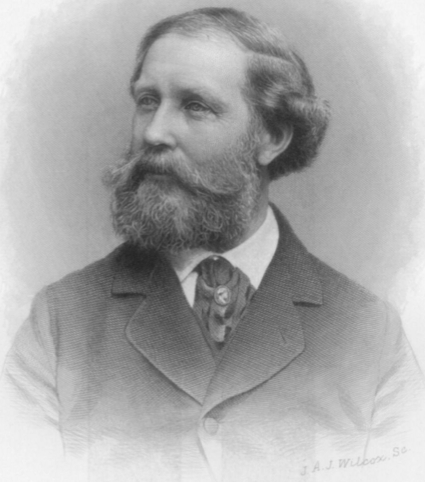
Charles C. Perkins, art historian, philanthropist, and founder of the Museum of Fine Arts

Perkins Family

- Thomas Handasyd Perkins (1764–1854), merchant, pioneer of the China trade, philanthropist
- Charles Perkins (1823–1886), art historian, philanthropist, founder of the Museum of Fine Arts
- Edward Perkins (1856–1905), constitutional lawyer
- Maxwell Perkins (1884–1947), literary editor of Ernest Hemingway, William Faulkner, and F. Scott Fitzgerald

=== Phillips ===
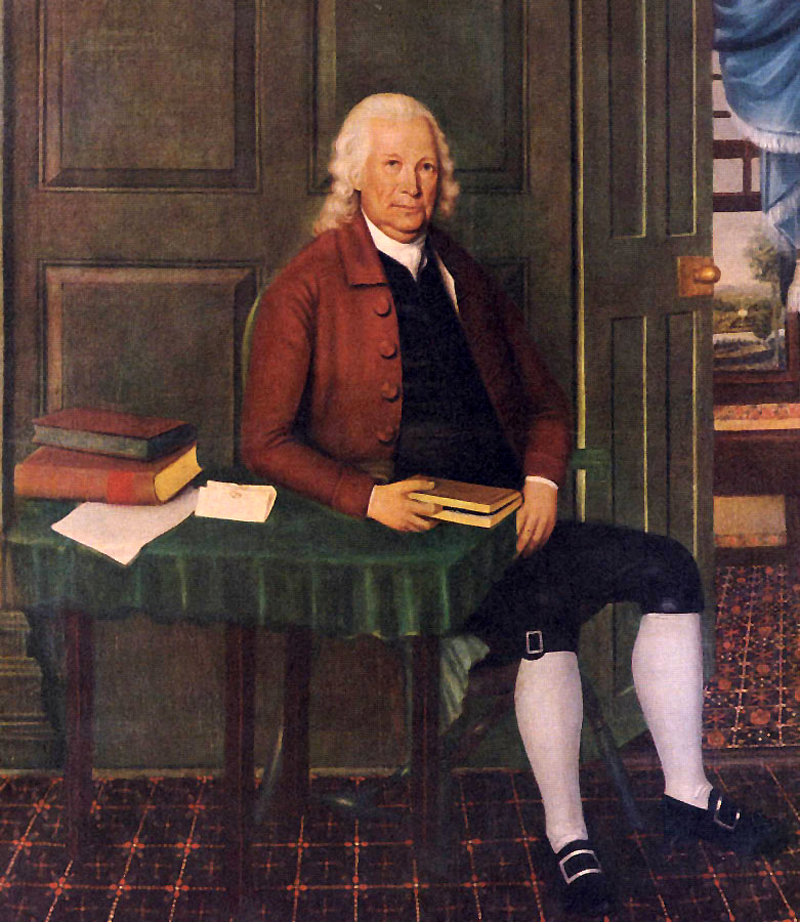
John Phillips, educator and founder of Phillips Exeter Academy

Phillips Family

- Rev. George Phillips (1593–1644), gateway ancestor to the Phillips New England family, one of the founders of Watertown, Massachusetts
- Christopher H. Phillips (1920–2008), politician, diplomat
- Samuel Phillips Jr. (1752–1802), politician, founder of Phillips Academy
- John Phillips (1719–1795), educator, founder of Phillips Exeter Academy
- John Sanborn Phillips (1861–1949), publisher of McClure's Magazine
- Wendell Phillips (1811–1884), abolitionist
- William Phillips (1878–1968), diplomat
- Samuel Phillips (1690–1771), first pastor of the South Church of Andover

Other notable relatives:

- Phillips Brooks (1835–1893), American Episcopal clergyman and author
- Samuel Phillips Huntington (1927–2008), Harvard University political science professor and author; grandson of John Sanborn Phillips
- Charles F. Brush (1849–1929), inventor, philanthropist
- Bill Gates (born 1955), billionaire software pioneer, philanthropist, investor, entrepreneur

=== Putnam ===
Putnam Family

- James Putnam (1725–1789), last attorney general in Massachusetts before American Revolution; judge and politician in New Brunswick
- James Putnam (1756–1838), Canadian politician
- Major General Israel Putnam (1718–1790), U.S. general during the Revolutionary War
  - Colonel Daniel Putnam (1759–1831), colonel in U.S. Continental Army; his home is Putnam Elms
    - John Day Putnam (1837–1904), Wisconsin politician
- William Lowell Putnam (1861–1924), and Elizabeth Lowell Putnam
  - George P. Putnam (1887–1950), publisher, explorer, husband of Amelia Earhart
  - Katherine L. Putnam (1890–1983), wife of Harvey Hollister Bundy
  - Roger Lowell Putnam (1893–1972), politician, businessman

=== Quincy ===
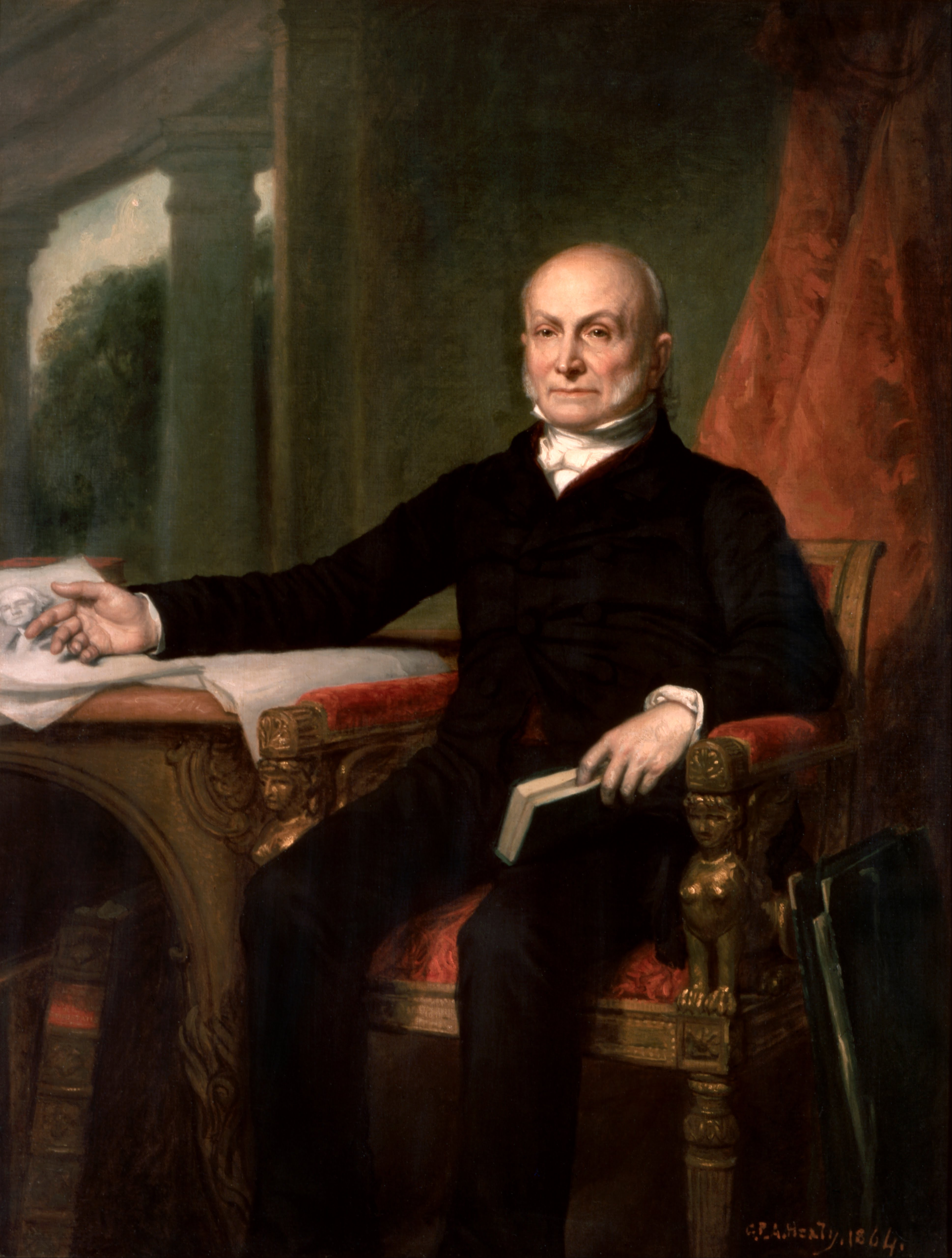
John Quincy Adams, sixth President of the United States

Quincy Family

- Edmund Quincy (1602–1636), settled in Massachusetts Bay Colony in 1633
- Josiah Quincy II (1744–1775), lawyer, revolutionary
  - Josiah Quincy III (1772–1864), member of the U.S. House of Representatives from Massachusetts, mayor of Boston, president of Harvard University
- Dorothy Quincy Hancock, wife of John Hancock
- Abigail Smith Adams (1744–1818), wife of John Adams
  - John Quincy Adams (1767–1848), President of the United States
- Fanny Howe (1940–2025), poet and novelist, granddaughter of Fanny Huntington Quincy

=== Rice ===
Rice Family Originally of Sudbury, Massachusetts:

- Deacon Edmund Rice (1594–1663), colonist
- Alexander Hamilton Rice (1818–1895), industrialist, mayor of Boston, governor of Massachusetts, member of the U.S. House of Representatives from Massachusetts
  - Alexander Hamilton Rice Jr. (1875–1956), physician, geographer, explorer
- Alexander Rice Esty (1826-1881), American architect
- Brigadier General Americus Vespucius Rice (1835–1904), U.S. general, member of the U.S. House of Representatives from Ohio, banker
- Brigadier General Edmund Rice (1842–1906), U.S. general, Medal of Honor recipient
- Edmund Rice (1819–1889), U.S. senator, member of the U.S. House of Representatives from Minnesota
- Henry Mower Rice (1816–1894), U.S. senator
- Luther Rice (1783–1836), Baptist clergyman, missionary to India
- Thomas Rice (1768–1854), member of the U.S. House of Representatives from Massachusetts
- William Marsh Rice (1816–1900), businessman, founder of Rice University
- William North Rice (1845–1928), geologist, educator
- William Whitney Rice (1826–1896), member of the U.S. House of Representatives from Massachusetts
- William B. Rice (1840–1909), industrialist, philanthropist

=== Saltonstall ===
Saltonstall Family

- Leverett Saltonstall I (1783–1845), politician, educator
- Leverett Saltonstall (1892–1979), U.S. senator
  - William L. Saltonstall (1927–2009), politician
- Elizabeth Saltonstall (1900–1990), lithographer, painter
- Philip Saltonstall Weld (1915–1984), World War II commando, environmentalist
- William G. Saltonstall (1905–1989), 8th Principal of Phillips Exeter Academy

=== Sargent ===
- Colonel Epes Sargent (1690–1762), colonel of militia before the Revolution and a justice of the general session court for more than 30 years
  - Paul Dudley Sargent (1745–1828), Revolutionary officer, one of the founding overseers of Bowdoin College
    - Harrison Tweed (1885–1969), lawyer, civic leader
      - Tweed Roosevelt (born 1942), great-grandson of President Theodore Roosevelt
  - John Sargent (1750–1824), Loyalist officer during the American Revolution
    - Winthrop Sargent (1753–1820), patriot, governor, politician, writer; member of the Federalist Party
    - Judith Sargent Murray (1751–1820), feminist, essayist, playwright, poet; her home is the Sargent House Museum
  - Daniel Sargent Sr. (1730–1806), merchant, owned Sargent's Wharf in Boston
    - Daniel Sargent (1764–1842), merchant, politician
      - Daniel Sargent Curtis (1825–1908), lawyer, banker, trustee of the BPL, owner of Palazzo Barbaro
    - Henry Sargent (1770–1845), painter, military man
    - Henry Winthrop Sargent (1810–1882), horticulturist, landscape gardener
    - Ignatius Sargent Sr. (1765–1821), merchant, military man
      - Ignatius Sargent (1800–1884), banker, railroad executive, horticulturalist, landscape gardener
        - Charles Sprague Sargent (1841–1927), botanist, first director of Harvard University's Arnold Arboretum
    - Lucius Manlius Sargent (1786–1867), author, antiquarian, temperance advocate
      - Brigadier General Horace Binney Sargent (1821–1908), U.S. Civil War general (Union Army), politician
    - John Singer Sargent (1856–1925), artist, considered the "leading portrait painter of his generation"
    - Winthrop Sargent Gilman (1808–1884), head of the banking house of Gilman, Son & Co. in New York City
    - Epes Sargent (1813–1880), editor, poet, playwright
    - Francis W. Sargent (1915–1998), 64th governor of Massachusetts
    - Benjamin Crowninshield Bradlee (1921–2014), (Harvard, 1942): editor of The Washington Post
    - Frances Sargent Osgood (1811–1850), poet, one of the most popular women writers during her time
    - Anna Maria Wells (née Foster; c. 1794–1868), early American poet, children's author
    - Katharine Sergeant Angell White (1892–1977), writer, fiction editor for The New Yorker magazine

=== Sears ===
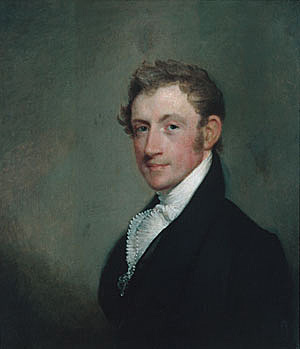
David Sears, businessman and philanthropist

Sears Family

- Richard Sears (1610–1676), colonist
- David Sears II (1787–1871), philanthropist, merchant, land-owner
- Clara Endicott Sears (1863–1960), author, philanthropist
- Mason Sears (1899–1973), politician, ambassador
- Emily Sears, wife of Henry Cabot Lodge Jr.
- John W. Sears (1930–2014), politician
- Harry Edward Sears (1870-1920), Physician, Military Officer

=== Sedgwick ===
Sedgwick Family

- Major General Robert Sedgwick (1611–1656), immigrant, Commander of the Massachusetts Bay Colony forces
  - Hon. Theodore Sedgwick (1746–1813), 4th Speaker of the U.S. House of Representatives; major in U.S. Continental Army
    - Major General John Sedgwick (1813–1864), U.S. Civil War general (Union Army)
    - Theodore Sedgwick Jr. (1780–1839), lawyer, author; politician
      - Theodore Sedgwick III (1811–1859), attorney, legal author, U.S. Minister to France
    - Catharine Maria Sedgwick (1789–1876), one of the first noted female writers in the United States
    - Henry Dwight Sedgwick (1785–1831), father of
      - Henry Dwight Sedgwick II (1824–1903), father of
        - Ellery Sedgwick (1872–1960), magazine editor; father of
          - Ellery Sedgwick Jr. (1908–1991), father of
            - Theodore “Tod” Sedgwick, diplomat, publisher
        - Henry Dwight Sedgwick III (1861–1957), lawyer, author; father of
          - Henry Dwight Sedgwick IV (1896–1914)
          - Francis Minturn Sedgwick (1904–1967), father of
            - Edith Minturn Sedgwick (1943–1971), American socialite, actress, fashion model who worked with Andy Warhol
          - Robert Minturn Sedgwick (1899–1976), father of
            - Henry Dwight Sedgwick V (1928–2018), venture capitalist; husband of Helen Stern (1930–2019) and Patricia Rosenwald Sedgwick (born 1933); father of
              - Mike Stern (born Michael Sedgwick 1953), jazz guitarist
              - Kyra Minturn Sedgwick (born 1965), actress, producer, director; wife of Kevin Bacon; mother of
                - Sosie Bacon (born 1992), actress
              - Holly Sedgwick (born c. 1955), mother of
                - Justin Nozuka (born 1988)
                - George Nozuka (born 1986)
                - Philip Nozuka (born 1987)
              - Robert Sedgwick (born c. 1951)

=== Shattuck ===
- Lemuel Shattuck (1793–1859), politician, historian, bookseller and publisher.
  - Henry Lee Shattuck (1879–1971), attorney, philanthropist, and politician

=== Shaw ===
- Robert Gould Shaw (1776–1853) m. Elizabeth Willard Parkman (1785–1853)
  - Francis George Shaw (1809–1882) m. Sarah Blake Sturgis (1815–1902)
    - Robert Gould Shaw (1837–1863)
    - Josephine Shaw (1843–1905) m. Charles Russell Lowell (1835–1864)
  - Quincy Adams Shaw (1825–1908) m. Pauline Agassiz (1841–1917)
    - Robert Gould Shaw II (1872–1930) m. Nancy Langhorne (1879–1964)
      - Robert Gould Shaw III (1898–1970)
      - Louis Agassiz Shaw II (1906–1987)

=== Storrow ===
- Charles Storer Storrow (1809–1904), civil engineer and industrialist
  - James Jackson Storrow (1837–1897), lawyer
    - James J. Storrow II (1864–1926), investment banker, automotive executive, politician, and Boy Scouts of America president. Husband of Helen Storrow.
      - James J. Storrow III (1892–1977), trustee
        - James J. Storrow IV (1917–1984), film producer and magazine publisher

=== Sturgis ===
- James Perkins Sturgis (1791 - 1851), wealthy merchant
- Nathaniel Russell Sturgis (1779 - 1856), merchant and socialite m. Susannah Thomsen Parkman, daughter of Samuel Parkman, an influential merchant
  - Sarah Blake Sturgis (1815–1902), abolitionist, women's rights supporter, anti-imperialist and philanthropist
  - Ann Cushing Sturgis Paine, married into the Paine family
  - Russell Sturgis (1805–1887), merchant active in the China trade
  - Henry Parkman Sturgis, United States Consul to the Philippines

=== Thayer ===
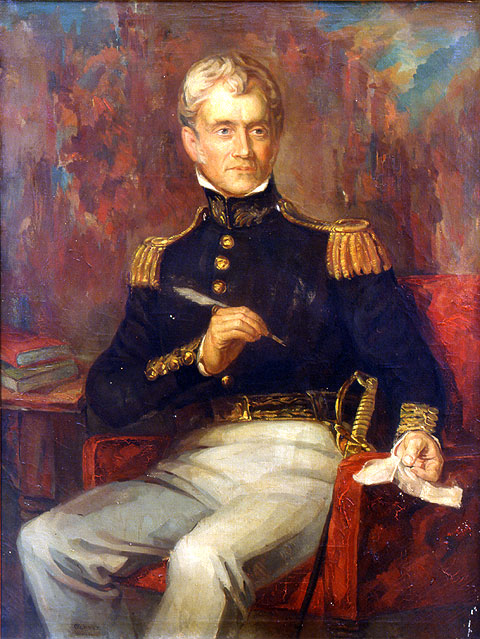
Sylvanus Thayer, the father of West Point

Thayer Family

- Brevet Brigadier General Sylvanus Thayer (1785–1872), U.S. general (Army), Father of West Point
- Nathaniel Thayer (1769–1840), Unitarian minister; father of
  - Nathaniel Thayer Jr. (1808–1883), financier, philanthropist; partner in John E. Thayer and brother firm which he left to clerks Kidder and Peabody after his retirement. One of the most generous citizens of Boston donating Thayer Hall to Harvard University; an overseer of Harvard, 1866–1868, and a fellow, 1868–1875; father of
    - Nathaniel Thayer, III (1851–1911), capitalist, pioneer railroad promoter
- Bayard Thayer (1862–1916), millionaire sportsman, horticulturist
- Eugene Van Rensselaer Thayer (1855–1907), financier, capitalist; father of
  - Eugene Van Rensselaer Thayer Jr. (1881–1937), Harvard class of 1904; President of Merchants and Chase National Banks; Chairman of Stutz motorcars
- James Bradley Thayer (1831–1902), American legal writer, educationist
- Ernest Thayer (1863–1940), American poet, author of "Casey at the Bat", and uncle of Scofield Thayer
- Scofield Thayer (1889–1982), American poet, publisher
- Eli Thayer (1819–1899), member of the U.S. House of Representatives from Massachusetts
- John A. Thayer (1857–1917), member of the U.S. House of Representatives from Massachusetts
- John R. Thayer (1845–1916), member of the U.S. House of Representatives from Massachusetts
- Brevet Major General John Milton Thayer (1820–1906), U.S. senator, U.S. Civil War general (Union Army); governor of Nebraska
- Webster Thayer (1857–1933), judge at the trial of Sacco and Vanzetti
- William Greenough Thayer (1863–1934), American educator; father of
  - Sigourney Thayer (1896–1944), theatrical producer, aviator, poet
- Tommy Thayer (born 1960), lead guitarist for the rock band Kiss

=== Thorndike ===
Thorndike Family

- Israel Thorndike (1755–1832), merchant, politician
- Augustus Thorndike (1896–1986), physician
- George Thorndike Angell (1823–1909), lawyer, philanthropist

=== Tudor ===
Tudor Family

- William Tudor (1750–1819), lawyer, politician, founder of the Massachusetts Historical Society
- William Tudor (1779–1830), cofounder of the North American Review and the Boston Athenaeum
- Frederic Tudor (1783–1864), Boston's "Ice King", founder of the Tudor Ice Company
- Tasha Tudor (1915–2008), illustrator and author of children's books

=== Warren ===
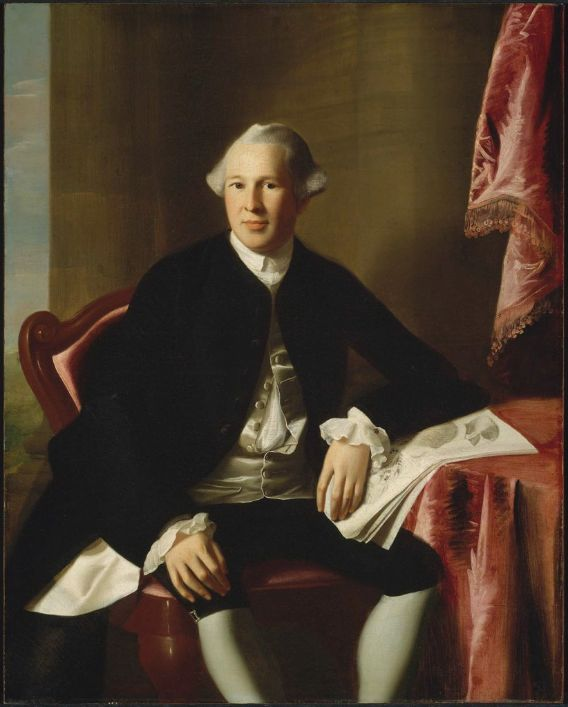
Joseph Warren, Major general and physician

- Richard Warren (1578–1628), London merchant, Mayflower passenger
- James Warren (1726–1808), paymaster general of Continental Army, major general in Massachusetts colony militia, president of Massachusetts Congress
- Mercy Otis Warren (1728–1814), playwright, historian, revolutionary
- Joseph Warren (1741–1775), major general in Massachusetts colony militia, hero/martyr of Bunker Hill, president of Massachusetts Congress; sent Paul Revere on his famous midnight ride
- John Warren (1753–1815), founder of Harvard Medical School, surgeon at Bunker Hill, co-founder of the Massachusetts Medical Society
- John Collins Warren (1778–1856), surgeon, president of the American Medical Association, founding dean of Harvard Medical School, a founder of Massachusetts General Hospital; gave first public demonstration of surgical anesthesia, a founder of The New England Journal of Medicine
- Winslow Warren (1838–1930), American attorney who served as Collector of Customs for the Port of Boston during the second administration of Grover Cleveland
- John Collins Warren Jr. (1842–1927), surgeon, president of the American Surgical Association
- Charles Warren (1868–1954), lawyer, author, legal scholar who won a Pulitzer Prize for his book The Supreme Court in United States History

=== Weld ===
Weld Family

- Thomas Weld (born c. 1600), colonist, Puritan minister
- William Gordon Weld (1775–1825), merchant
- William Fletcher Weld (1800–1881), merchant, philanthropist
- Ezra Greenleaf Weld (1801–1874), daguerreotypist
- Theodore Dwight Weld (1803–1895), abolitionist
- Stephen Minot Weld (1806–1867), politician, educator
- George Walker Weld (1840–1905), philanthropist
- Brevet Brigadier General Stephen Minot Weld Jr. (1842–1920), U.S. Civil War general (Union Army)
- Charles Goddard Weld (1857–1911), philanthropist
- Isabel Weld Perkins (1877–1948), philanthropist
- Philip Saltonstall Weld (1915–1984), World War II commando, environmentalist
- Tuesday Weld (born 1943), actress
- William Weld (born 1945), governor of Massachusetts, 2016 Libertarian Party Vice Presidential Candidate

=== Whitney ===
- Eli Whitney (1765–1825)
- William Collins Whitney (1841–1904)

=== Wigglesworth ===
Wigglesworth Family

- Michael Wigglesworth (1631–1705), colonist, clergyman; father of
  - Edward Michael Wigglesworth (c. 1693–1765), clergyman, educator; father of
    - Edward Wigglesworth (1732–1794), academician
- Richard B. Wigglesworth (1891–1960), ambassador to Canada, member of the U.S. House of Representatives from Massachusetts

=== Winthrop ===
Winthrop Family

Patrilineal descendants:

- Lucy Winthrop Downing: mother of diplomat Sir George Downing, 1st Baronet, founder of New York, of Downing Street, London, and ultimately of Downing College, Cambridge, UK; Lucy's letter to her brother Governor Winthrop provided the impetus for the founding of Harvard College; sister of
- John Winthrop (1588–1649), founding governor of Massachusetts Bay Colony; father of
  - John Winthrop (1606–1676), governor of Connecticut
    - Fitz-John Winthrop (1637–1711), governor of Connecticut
- John Winthrop, husband of Anne Dudley, granddaughter of Thomas Dudley
  - John Winthrop (1714–1779), acting president of Harvard, pioneer of American science
    - James Winthrop (1752–1821), librarian, jurist
- Thomas Lindall Winthrop (1760–1841), lieutenant governor of Massachusetts
- Robert Charles Winthrop (1809–1894), lawyer, politician, philanthropist

Other descendants:

- Kwame Anthony Appiah (born 1954), philosopher, author, cultural theorist and descendant in the female line of John Winthrop.

== Bibliography ==
- Cleveland Amory, The Proper Bostonians, 1947

== See also ==
- American gentry
- Bourgeoisie
- Colonial families of Maryland
- First Families of Virginia
- Golden Square Mile
- Old Philadelphians
- Philadelphia Main Line
- Socialite
- Upper class
- White Anglo-Saxon Protestant
