= Norcross =

Norcross may refer to:

- Norcross, Georgia, a suburb in metro Atlanta
- Norcross, Minnesota
- Norcross (surname)
- Norcross High School, a public school in Norcross, Georgia (named after Jonathan Norcross)
