= Endicott =

Endicott may refer to:

== Places ==
- Endicott, Nebraska, a village in Jefferson County, Nebraska, USA
- Endicott, New York, a village in Broome County, New York, USA
- Endicott, Virginia, a small community in Franklin County, Virginia, USA
- Endicott, Washington, a town in Whitman County, Washington, USA
- Endicott (MBTA station), Dedham, Massachusetts, USA
- Endicott Island, an artificial island in Alaska, USA

== People ==
- Endicott (surname), includes a list of people with the surname
- Endicott Peabody (1920–1997), Governor of Massachusetts

== Other uses ==
- "Endicott", a big band jazz song by Kid Creole and the Coconuts from their 1985 album In Praise of Older Women and Other Crimes
- Endicott College, co-educational independent college located in Beverly, Massachusetts
- Endicott Pear Tree, oldest living cultivated fruit tree in North America
- USS Endicott (DD-495), a US Navy destroyer

== See also ==
- Endicott Board, body convened in 1886 to address coastal defense needs of the US in light of rapid advances in naval ship design and weaponry
- Endicott Johnson Corporation, formerly the largest manufacturer of shoes in the US
