= Christoph Daniel Ebeling =

German scholar

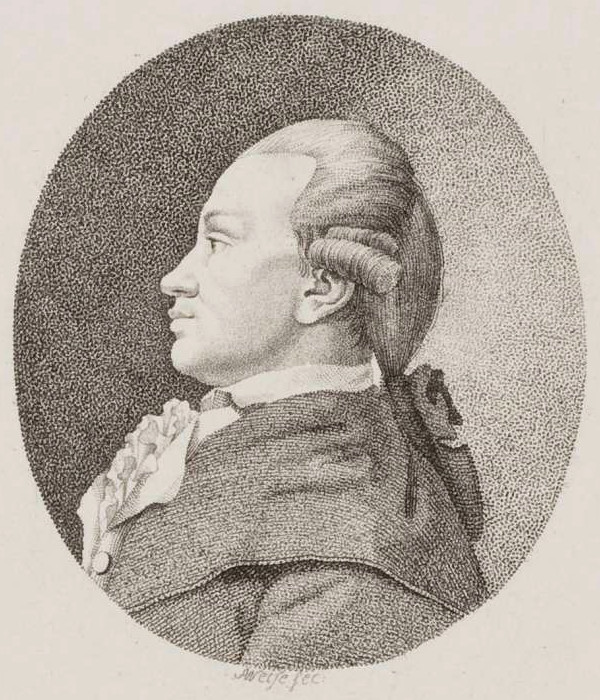
- Born: 20 November 1741; Hildesheim
- Died: 30 June 1817; Hamburg
- Education: University of Göttingen
- Occupations: Librarian, historian, writer, theologian, scholar, librettist

Christoph Daniel Ebeling (20 November 1741 – 30 June 1817) was a scholar of Germany who studied the geography and history of North America.

== Biography ==
Ebeling was born near Hildesheim, Hanover. He studied theology at Göttingen, but devoted himself to geographical studies, and for 33 years taught history and Greek in the Hamburg gymnasium. He was also superintendent of the Hamburg library, and collected about 10,000 maps and nearly 4,000 books relating to America. Ebeling's magnum opus was a Geography and History of North America (5 vols., Hamburg, 1796–1816), forming a continuation of Büsching's General Geography. He received a vote of thanks from the United States Congress for this work.

He was noted for his extensive knowledge of oriental languages, of classic and foreign literature, and of history and geography. Ebeling's collection was purchased by Israel Thorndike in the year after Ebeling's death, and given by him to Harvard. As a result, Harvard's library collections grew massively, virtually overnight. Through Thorndike, Ebeling's maps became the founding gift that created the Harvard Map Collection.

Ebeling was elected a member of the American Antiquarian Society in 1814. He died in Hamburg.

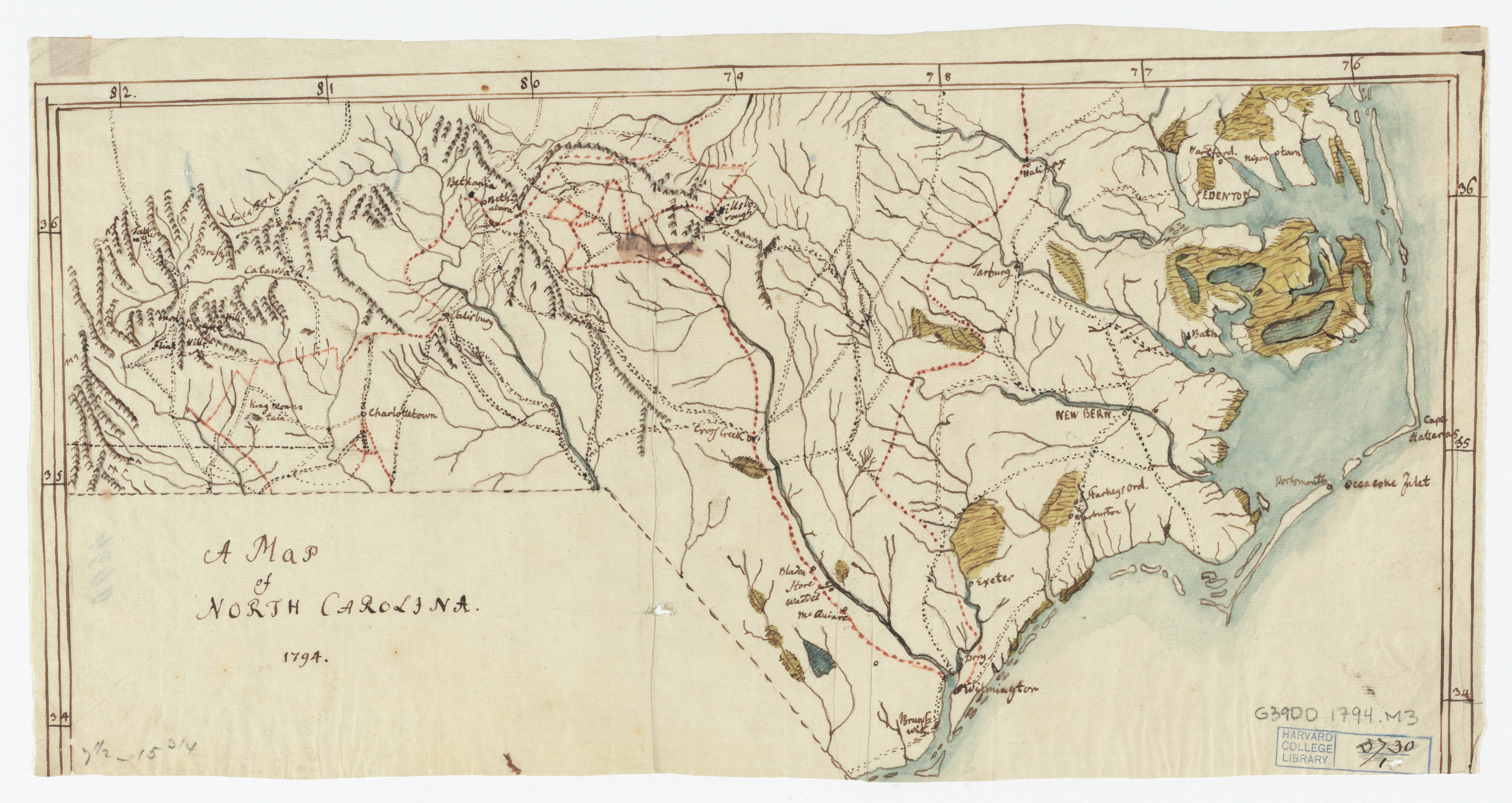
Shows names of cities, towns, and boundary with South Carolina. Ms. map, pen-and- ink drawing likely traced by Christophe Daniel Ebeling. Relief shown pictorially. Prime meridian: London. Original map appears in American geography / by Jedidiah Morse; Harrison, sc. Piccadilly, London: by J. Stockdale, July 24th, 1794. Collections and items have been digitized with the generous support of The Polonsky Foundation.
