= Israel Thorndike =

American merchant, politician, industrialist and slave trader

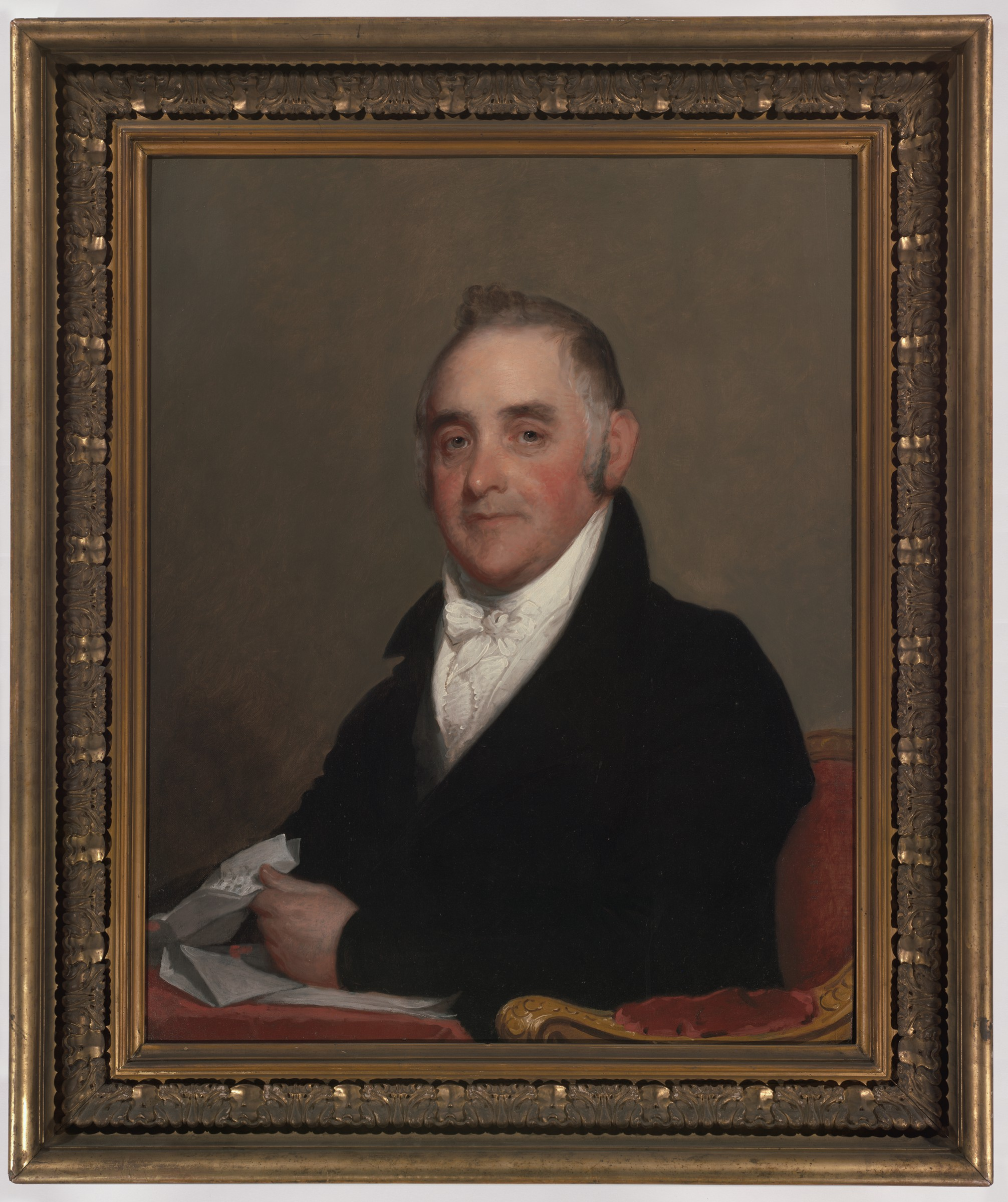
- Portrait by Gilbert Stuart
- Born: April 30, 1755; Beverly, Massachusetts
- Died: May 9, 1832 (aged 77); Boston, Massachusetts
- Occupations: Cooper, privateer, shipping magnate, real estate speculator, manufacturer
- Organization(s): Brown and Thorndike
- Spouse(s): Mercy Trask, Anna Dodge, Sarah Dana

Israel Thorndike (April 30, 1755 – May 9, 1832) was an American merchant, politician, industrialist, and slave trader. He made a fortune in privateering and the Old China Trade, was active in Federalist Party politics during the Thomas Jefferson and James Madison administrations, and later was one of the largest financiers of the early Industrial Revolution in the United States.

== Career ==
Thorndike was born in Beverly, Massachusetts on April 30, 1755. He went to sea at an early age, and in 1772 formed a partnership with Captain Moses Brown of Waltham, Massachusetts that would last over two decades. The partnership, called Brown & Thorndike, concentrated on trade in the Caribbean and in coastal carrying along the North American coast. Upon the outbreak of the American Revolution, he joined the Massachusetts Navy as an officer before turning to privateering. In his twenties, Thorndike served as First Lieutenant to Jonathan Haraden, Captain of the General Pickering letter of marque privateer. Partnering with a number of fellow merchants in Beverly and Salem, including George Cabot, he invested in numerous privateer ventures that brought him a small fortune by the close of the war.

In the late 1780s, Thorndike began widening his horizons. He invested in the failed Beverly Manufacturing Company, an early attempt to create industrial factories, but withdrew his investment when the venture looked as though it would fail. He also became involved in politics, and in 1788 was a pro-ratification delegate to the Massachusetts Convention on the question of ratifying the newly proposed U.S. Constitution. As a delegate, he was not known as a speaker, but operated as a backroom whip who was "as efficient as any man" at the convention in securing ratification. Later, in the 1790s, he entered the Old China Trade and the slave trade, and over the next decade acquired an enormous fortune, estimated in 1803 to be $400,000.

In 1802, Thorndike was elected to the Massachusetts legislature from Beverly as a member of the Federalist Party, and was considered to be a member of its Essex Junto. The Embargo of 1807 had a negative impact on Thorndike's trade, and drove him to become a particularly radical opponent of the Democratic-Republican Party under the presidencies of Thomas Jefferson and James Madison. In 1810 Thorndike moved from Beverly to Boston, where his mansion became a center for political and social discourse. The term "gerrymander" is attributed to the outcome of a dinner party at Thorndike's Boston home in February 1812, "where Elkanah Tisdale, a miniature painter, drew wings on the salamander shaped map of the new Republican-leaning election district in Essex County." After his move to Boston, Thorndike developed large tracts around today's Downtown Crossing neighborhood in Boston into an elite residential neighborhood.

Thorndike was a strong opponent of the War of 1812. At a political gathering in the summer of 1812, he stated that he would willingly give all of his wealth to oppose the continuation of the war. Later, he was considered to have been among the men who may have contemplated secession from the Union as a last-ditch option, a charge which he later denied. Radical Federalists like John Lowell supported his selection as a delegate to the Hartford Convention, but he was not chosen.

In 1813, fellow merchant Francis Cabot Lowell asked Thorndike to invest in his new Boston Manufacturing Company. Thorndike and his son, Israel, Jr., received a twenty percent ownership stake in the company, which became the first successful textile manufacturer in the country and which inaugurated the Industrial Revolution in the United States. Upon Lowell's death, Thorndike became president of the Boston Manufacturing Company, and served in that role from 1817 to 1831, overseeing the company's significant expansion. He also invested in numerous other industrial ventures, which made him the wealthiest man in New England, with a greater amount of capital invested in textile manufacturing than any other person in the United States. As a result, Thorndike is considered to have been the fiftieth wealthiest American of all time (adjusted for inflation).

Thorndike used his immense wealth for philanthropic enterprises, such as to buy the map collection of German scholar Christoph Daniel Ebeling. He donated it to Harvard University, thereby founding the Harvard Map Collection, in 1818 after Ebeling's death.

Thorndike also remained somewhat active in politics. He was a delegate to the Massachusetts Constitutional Convention of 1820–1821, where he supported property requirements for voting and opposed the popular election of the Massachusetts Governor's Council. In 1825, along with his neighbor, Daniel Webster, who owned the adjoining townhouse, he hosted a dinner in the honor of the Marquis de Lafayette on the fiftieth anniversary of the Battle of Bunker Hill.

Thorndike died at his home in Boston on May 9, 1832, with a fortune estimated between $1 and $1.8 million.

== Family ==
Thorndike was married three times: first, to Mercy Trask, who died in 1784; second, to Anna Dodge, who died in 1817; and third to Sarah Dana, who survived him. He had seven sons and two daughters who reached maturity. His great-great-grandson, Augustus Thorndike, was Chief of Surgery at Harvard University. He is also the 4th-great-grandfather of John Kerry.

== Archives and records ==
- Israel Thorndike business records at Baker Library Special Collections, Harvard Business School.
