= Henry Minot =

American ornithologist and railroad executive

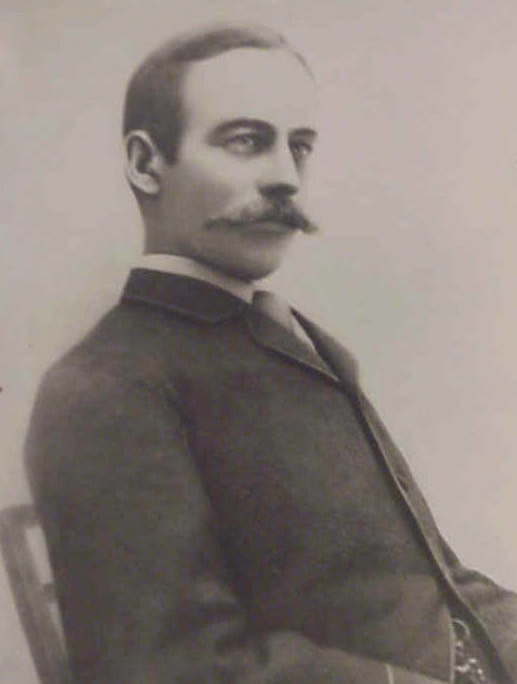
- circa 1880–1890
- Born: Henry Davis Minot; August 18, 1859; Jamaica Plain, Massachusetts, U.S.
- Died: November 14, 1890 (aged 31); Pennsylvania
- Citizenship: United States
- Education: Harvard College (attended)
- Occupations: Writer, ornithologist, and railroad executive
- Parents: William Minot (father); Katherine Maria Minot (mother)

Henry Davis Minot (/ˈmaɪnɒt/ MY-not; August 18, 1859 – November 14, 1890) was a Massachusetts ornithologist and railroad executive.

Born at his family's estate, Woodbourne in Jamaica Plain, Massachusetts, Minot was the fourth of five sons of William and Katherine Maria (Sedgwick) Minot.

He attended Harvard College in 1876, where he was friends with classmate Theodore Roosevelt, who, like Minot, was interested in ornithology. In 1877, he published The Land Birds and Game Birds of New England at the age of seventeen. He left Harvard during his sophomore year.

After leaving Harvard he became involved in railroad investments. He traveled extensively and reported on various railroad systems, from Mexico to Minnesota. He became associated with James J. Hill, and at one point, he was the director of the Great Northern Railway. In 1887, he became the president of a new railroad line which connected Manitoba to Lake Superior. He was also involved in a variety of other commercial enterprises, including steamships and streetcars in Superior, Wisconsin.

== Legacy ==
At age 31, he was killed in a train crash near New Florence, Pennsylvania, on November 14, 1890.

The city of Minot, North Dakota (and indirectly, nearby Minot Air Force Base) was named after him, and a park in Massachusetts was dedicated in his honor.
