= Augustus Thorndike =

Augustus Thorndike, M.D. (1896–1986), was the chief of surgery at Harvard University Health Service from 1931 to 1962 and a pioneer in sports medicine.

Thorndike served in World War I and was a 1919 graduate of Harvard College and a 1921 graduate of Harvard Medical School. He pioneered many advancements in sports medicine, including the rules that a physician must be present at every sports event and that a doctor must decide if an injured athlete should play. He also designed advanced equipment for football players and was the first to insist that hockey players wear helmets.

Thorndike began working at the Massachusetts General Hospital in 1921 as a general surgeon before also offering his medical services to the Harvard University Athletic Department in 1926. It was based upon his experiences working with athletes during this period that he determined there to be a specific need to improve medical care for athletes and later that specialization in the field was necessary. In 1938, Thorndike wrote America's first book on athletic injuries. He wrote two books, "Athletic Injuries" and "Manual of Bandaging, Strapping and Splinting".

One of the principal reasons for which Dr. Thorndike is regarded as a "pioneer" in the industry was his insistence that only a physician was qualified to determine whether an athlete was healthy enough to compete or play their sport and that this decision should not be left to coaches. He was the first to insist that hockey players wear helmets, introduced the idea of taping, and to design improved protective gear for football players.

Serving twenty-two months in the Pacific during World War II, he was chief of surgical services and commanding officer of the Harvard Unit, 105th General Hospital, the largest army hospital overseas. In 1945, he was awarded the Legion of Merit for his work on behalf of veterans. Thorndike also directed a program for the rehabilitation of the wounded after the war. From 1956 to 1959, Thorndike served as the sixteenth president of the Harvard Club of Boston. He retired from Harvard in 1962.

Dr. Thorndike's father, also named Augustus Thorndike (1863-1940), co-founded the Industrial School for Crippled and Deformed Children in Boston, MA in 1894 along with his colleague, Dr. Edward Bradford. It was the first school in the country for children with physical disabilities. The name was changed to Cotting School in the 1970s.
