= Cotting School =

Location
- Lexington, Massachusetts; United States; 42°25′12″N 71°14′15″W

Information
- Type: Chapter 766 school
- Established: 1893
- President: Bridget Irish
- Faculty: 70 - Over 75% have Master's degrees
- Enrollment: 120
- Student to teacher ratio: 3:1
- Campus: Suburban, 13 acres
- Colors: Blue and gold
- Athletics: Cotting School Falcons
- Mascot: Falcon
- Website: https://www.cotting.org/

Cotting School is a private, non-profit school for children with special needs located in Lexington, Massachusetts, United States. It was founded in 1893 as the nation's first school for children with disabilities. Cotting's preschool, lower, middle, and upper schools offer academic instruction focusing on a variety of skills and content areas, vocational assessment, and training.

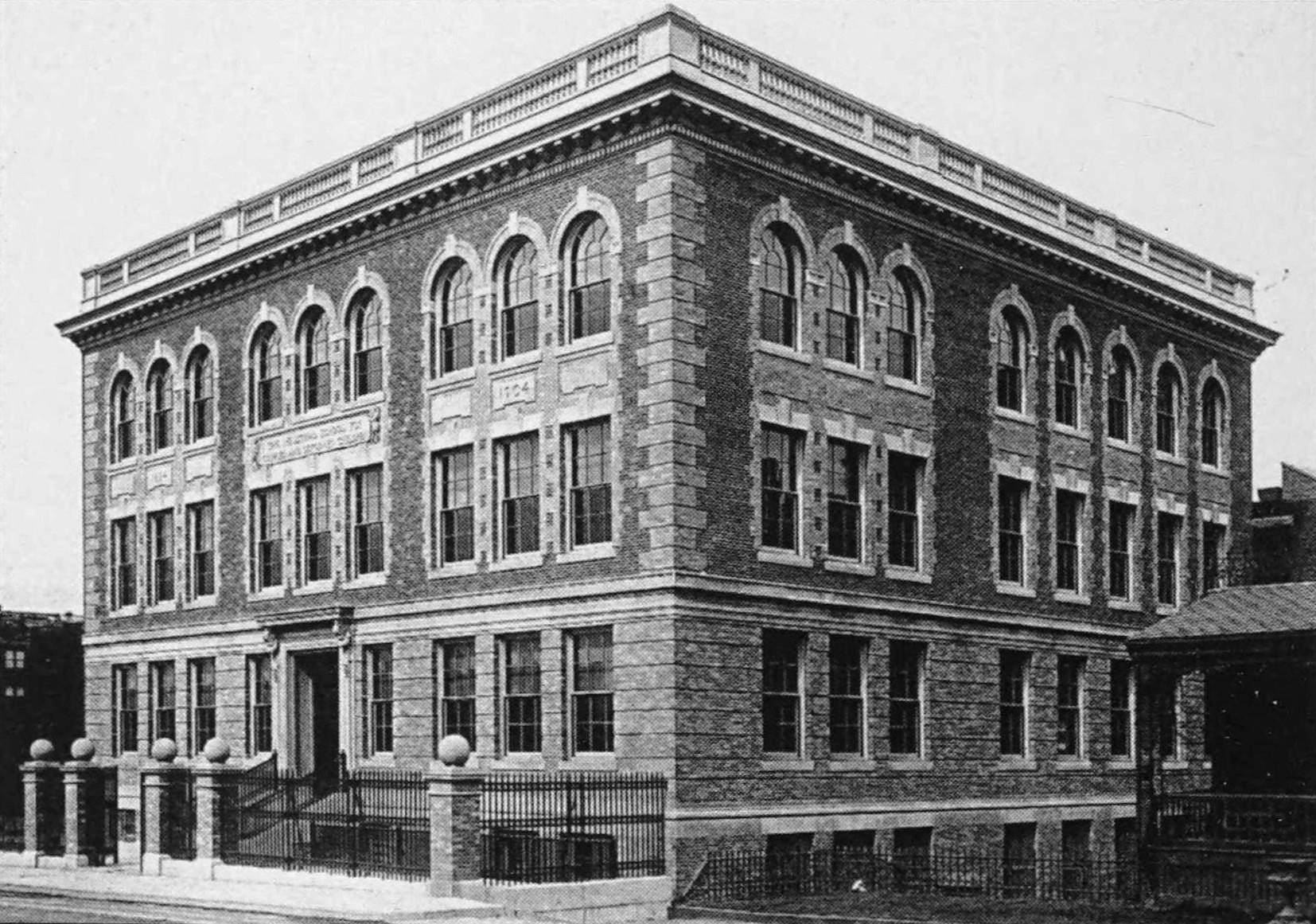
Building at 241 St. Botolph Street, designed by Peabody & Stearns

== History ==
Cotting School was founded in 1893 and was America's first day school for children with physical disabilities. From its founding until its merger with the Krebs School in 1986, Cotting School was located at 241 St. Botolph Street in Boston Massachusetts. The school was founded by Drs. Edward H. Bradford and Augustus Thorndike, both orthopedic surgeons at Children's Hospital Boston and was originally called The Industrial School for Crippled and Deformed Children. The school was also known as the Industrial School for Crippled Children and Cotting School for Handicapped Children.

	Superintendent/President	Tenure	Events / Bio
1.	Mary M. Perry	1893–1919	First Superintendent/First permanent home for school, 241 St. Botolph Street, Boston, MA
2.	Charles Belknap	1919–1923	
3.	Vernon Brackett	1923–1955	
4.	William Carmichael	1955–1984	
5.	Carl Mores	1984–2004	Krebs School merged into Cotting School and moved to 453 Concord Avenue, Lexington, MA
6.	David W. Manzo	2004–2021	
7.	Bridget Irish	2021–present	

Cotting School, A Pictorial History (ISBN 978-0738557656) was written by David Manzo and Elizabeth Campbell Peters and published by Arcadia Publishing (April 2, 2008).

== Services ==
The school offers the following services: special education, assistive technology, art, music, library/media, dental, vision, nursing, occupational therapy, physical therapy, speech therapy, industrial arts, tutorial services, pre-vocational and vocational training. Cotting School is accredited by the New England Association of Schools and Colleges (NEASC) and has full approval status from the Massachusetts Department of Elementary and Secondary Education.

== Affiliations ==
- AccesSportAmerica
- Association of Independent Schools of New England
- Best Buddies of Massachusetts
- Boston College
- Boston University's Sargent College of Health and Rehabilitation Sciences
- Children's Hospital Boston
- Children's League of Massachusetts
- Emerson College Clinical Training Program
- International Association of Special Education
- Massachusetts Association of 766-Approved Private Schools
- Massachusetts Council of Human Service Providers
- Massachusetts Special Olympics
- New England Handicapped Sports Association (NEHSA)
- New England College of Optometry
- Northeastern University's Bouve College of Health Sciences
- Perkins School for the Blind
- Regis College
- Salem State College
- Tufts University School of Dental Medicine
- Wheelock College

== Resources ==
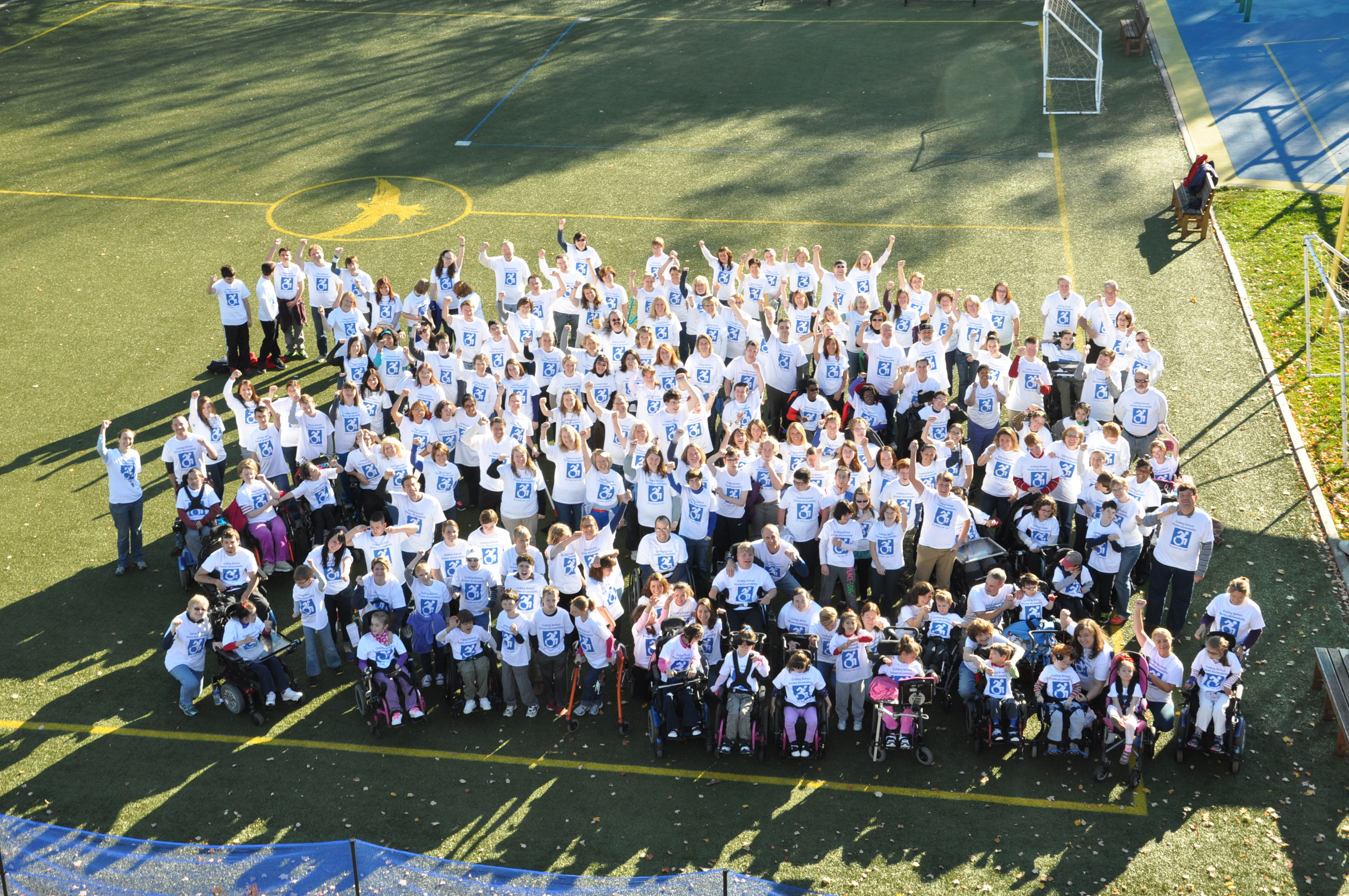
Cotting School All School Photo

- Cotting School website
