= Norcross (surname) =

Norcross is an Anglo-Saxon locational surname, for someone from Norcross near Poulton-le-Fylde, Lancashire, England.

Notable people with the surname include:

- Alastair Norcross, American philosopher and professor at University of Colorado
- Amasa Norcross (1824–1898), American politician
- Arthur D. Norcross (1848–1916), American musician and politician
- Bryan Norcross (born 1950), American meteorologist and hurricane specialist
- Daniel Norcross (born 1969), British cricket commentator
- David A. Norcross (born 1937), American politician
- Donald Norcross (born 1958), American politician, brother of George and John C. Norcross
- Eleanor Norcross (1854–1923), American painter
- Emily Norcross Dickinson (1804–1882), mother of American poet Emily Dickinson
- Frank Herbert Norcross (1869–1952), American judge
- Fred Norcross (1884–1965), American college football player and coach
- George Norcross (born 1956), businessman and prominent political figure in New Jersey, brother of Donald and John C. Norcross
- John Norcross (1688–1758), English pirate
- John C. Norcross (born 1957), psychologist, author, and professor at the University of Scranton, brother of Donald and George Norcross
- Jonathan Norcross (1808–1898), Atlanta pioneer and politician
- Kirk Norcross (born 1988), English reality television celebrity
- Mick Norcross (1963–2021), English businessman and television personality
- Otis Norcross (1811–1882), American politician
- Pliny Norcross (1838–1915), American politician
- Savannah Norcross (born 2000), American ice hockey player
- The Norcross Brothers, American builders and construction associates of architect H.H. Richardson

== Fictional people ==
- James Norcross, fictional president of the United States in the cartoon series Super President
