= Endicott (surname) =

Endicott is a surname. Notable people with the surname include:

- Henry Bradford Endicott (1853–1920), American businessman and founder of the Endicott Johnson Corporation
- James Endicott (church leader) (1865–1954), Canadian church leader and missionary
- James Gareth Endicott (1898–1993), Canadian minister, Christian missionary and socialist
- John Endicott (c. 1588–1665), colonial magistrate, soldier and governor of the Massachusetts Bay Colony
- Marina Endicott (born 1958), Canadian novelist
- Sam Endicott (born 1974), the lead singer for the New York-based band The Bravery
- Shane Endicott (born 1981), former Pittsburgh Penguins draft pick, professional ice hockey player
- Timothy Endicott, Canadian legal scholar; former Dean of the Oxford Faculty of Law
- William Crowninshield Endicott (1826–1900), American politician
