= Robert Gould Shaw (disambiguation) =

Robert Gould Shaw (1837–1863) was a Union Army soldier in the American Civil War

Robert Gould Shaw may also refer to:

- Robert Gould Shaw II (1872–1930), landowner and socialite, cousin of the soldier
- Robert Gould Shaw III (1898–1970), socialite, son of the landowner
