= Louis Agassiz Shaw Jr. =

American physiology teacher and inventor (1886–1940)

- Born: September 25, 1886; Chestnut Hill, Massachusetts, U.S.
- Died: August 27, 1940 (aged 53); Back Bay, Boston, Massachusetts, U.S.
- Occupations: Physician, scientist, inventor
- Known for: Co-inventor of the iron lung
- Spouse: Joanne Bird
- Children: 2
- Relatives: Quincy Adams Shaw (grandfather)

Louis Agassiz Shaw Jr. (September 25, 1886 – August 27, 1940) was an instructor of physiology at the School of Public Health of Harvard University, where he is credited in 1928 along with Philip Drinker for inventing the Drinker respirator, the first widely used iron lung.

== Family and early life ==
Shaw's parents were Louis Agassiz Shaw Sr. and Mary Elizabeth Saltonstall. Both parents came from wealthy and politically influential Boston Brahmin families with roots extending back to the Mayflower. The couple's elder son was Quincy Adams Shaw III (born May 21, 1885). Louis Sr. died at home in Chestnut Hill from tuberculosis when Louis Jr. was only four years old on July 2, 1891.

Shaw's father was born at 26 Mount Vernon Street in Beacon Hill in 1861, and the following year the family moved to Jamaica Plain. He attended George Washington Copp Noble School in Boston, and graduated from Harvard University in 1884. He married Mary Elizabeth Saltonstall on June 30, 1884, in Newton, right after the graduation ceremony.

Shaw's uncle Robert Gould Shaw II was the first husband of Nancy Witcher Langhorne. She later married Waldorf Astor, the eldest son of William Waldorf Astor and Mary Dahlgren Paul of the Astor family.

Shaw's paternal grandparents were Quincy Adams Shaw (one of the richest men in Massachusetts through his investment in the Calumet and Hecla Mining Company) and Pauline Agassiz. Shaw's great grandfather, for whom he was named, was Louis Agassiz, noted professor of zoology at Harvard University. Another of Shaw's great grandfathers was Leverett Saltonstall I, a member of the United States House of Representatives.

Shaw married Joanne Bird of East Walpole on June 14, 1910. The couple had two children, Joanne Bird Shaw (born March 31, 1911) and Pauline Agassiz Shaw (November 4, 1915 — October 30, 1992).

== Education ==
Louis Jr. followed his father's educational footsteps, first attending the George Washington Copp Noble School (which had been renamed the Noble and Greenough School in 1892) and later attending Harvard University, graduating in 1909. Shaw's cousin Leverett Saltonstall also pursued the same academic path. Shaw continued to study for a couple of years after graduation, taking classes in botany, geology, and zoology. He contracted tuberculosis in the summer of 1911, and was consequently unable to work until the spring of 1913.

== Career ==
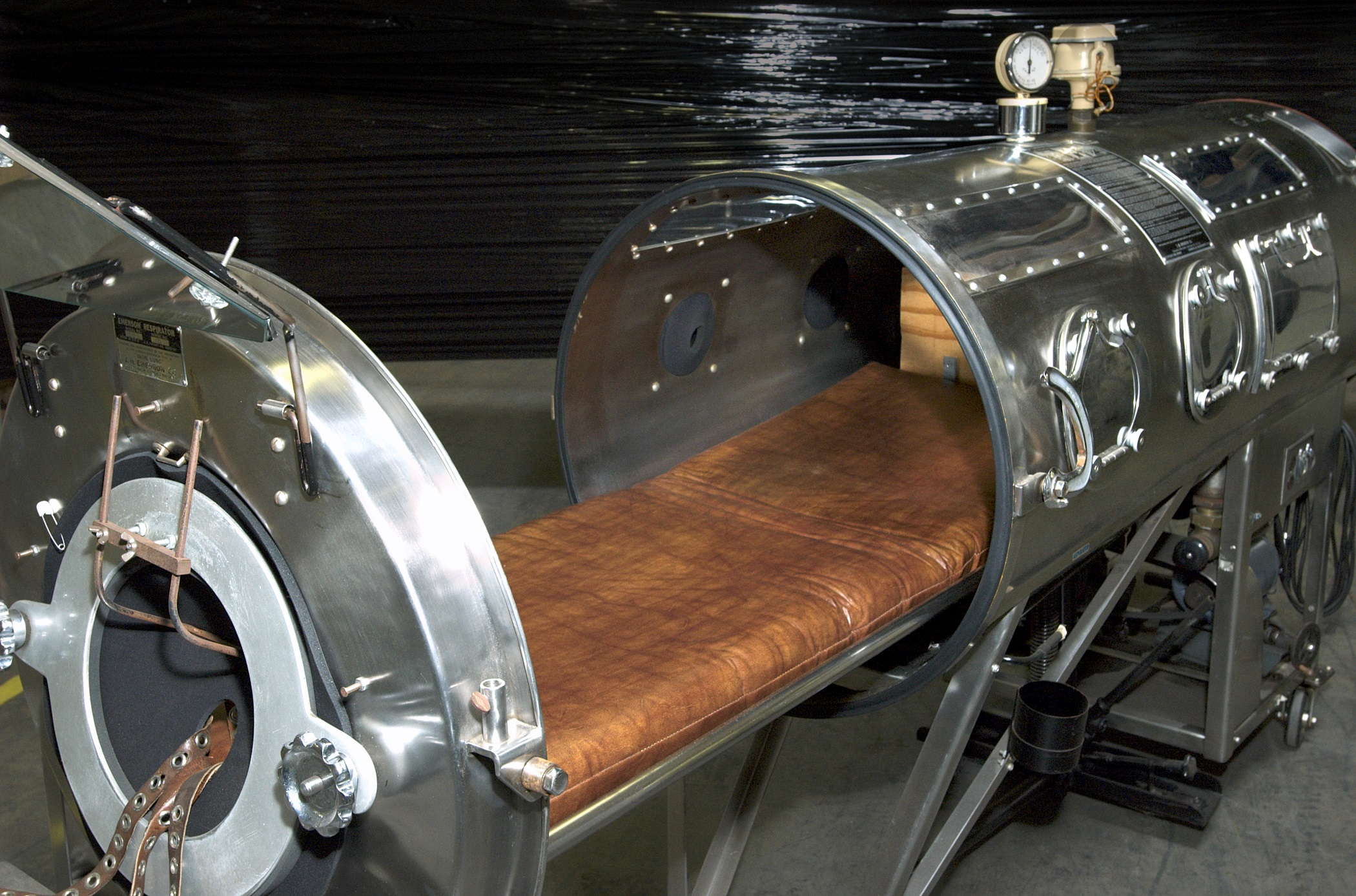
An Emerson iron lung. The patient lies within the chamber, which when sealed provides an oscillating atmospheric pressure. This particular machine was donated to the Centers for Disease Control and Prevention Museum by the family of polio patient Barton Hebert of Covington, Louisiana, who had used the device from the late 1950s until his death in 2003.

Beginning in 1914, his research focused exclusively on physiology. Shaw and his family moved into the brownstone building located at 6 Marlborough Street in the Back Bay in 1917, having acquired the property upon the death of his grandmother, Pauline Agassiz Shaw.

From late 1917 until early 1919, Shaw and his research team conducted investigations in his home laboratory on the physiological effects of poisonous gases and other problems related to the ongoing war in Europe. In the spring of 1919, he joined the faculty at the Harvard-MIT School for Health Officers in the department of industrial hygiene. The Harvard-MIT School for Health Officers was a joint venture between Harvard Medical School and Massachusetts Institute of Technology (MIT) that began in 1913. The joint venture ended in 1922, when the Harvard School of Public Health was formally established.

In 1927, Shaw was arrested for the distillation of alcohol, which was illegal in the United States during Prohibition.

Shaw was an instructor in physiology at the Harvard School of Public Health, where he is credited in 1928 along with Philip Drinker (1894–1972, associate professor of industrial hygiene) and his brother Cecil Kent Drinker (1887–1956, later dean of the Harvard School of Public Health) for inventing the first widely used iron lung. The machine was powered by an electric motor with air pumps from two vacuum cleaners. The air pumps changed the pressure inside a rectangular, airtight metal box, pulling air in and out of the lungs.

== Publications ==
- Drinker, CK; Shaw, LA (1921). "Quantitative Distribution of Particulate Material (Manganese Dioxide) Administered Intravenously to the Cat". J Exp Med. 33 (1): 77–98. doi:10.1084/jem.33.1.77. PMC 2128167. PMID 19868482.
- Lund, CC; Shaw LA; Drinker CK (1921). "Quantitative Distribution of Particulate Material (Manganese Dioxide) Administered Intravenously to the Dog, Rabbit, Guinea Pig, Rat, Chicken, and Turtle". J Exp Med. 33 (2): 231–8. doi:10.1084/jem.33.2.231. PMC 2128175. PMID 19868491.
- Drinker, CK; Shaw LA; Drinker KR (1923). "The Deposition and Subsequent Course of Particulate Material (Manganese Dioxide and Manganese Meta-Silicate) Administered Intravenously to Cats and to Rabbits". J Exp Med. 37 (6): 829–50. doi:10.1084/jem.37.6.829. PMC 2128415. PMID 19868763.
- Shaw, LA (1928). "Cutaneous Respiration of the Cat". American Journal of Physiology. 85 (1): 158–67. doi:10.1152/ajplegacy.1928.85.1.158.
- Shaw, LA; Drinker, P (1929). "AN APPARATUS FOR THE PROLONGED ADMINISTRATION OF ARTIFICIAL RESPIRATION: I. A Design for Adults and Children". J Clin Invest. 7 (2): 229–47. doi:10.1172/JCI100226. PMC 434785. PMID 16693859.
- Shaw, LA; Drinker, P (1929). "AN APPARATUS FOR THE PROLONGED ADMINISTRATION OF ARTIFICIAL RESPIRATION: II. A Design for Small Children and Infants with an Appliance for the Administration of Oxygen and Carbon Dioxide". J Clin Invest. 8 (1): 33–46. doi:10.1172/JCI100253. PMC 424606. PMID 16693884.
- Drinker, P; Shaw, LA (1932). "The prolonged administration of artificial respiration". Journal of the Franklin Institute. 213 (4): 355–72. doi:10.1016/S0016-0032(32)90444-X.
