= Henry Scarsbrook Langhorne =

American landowner and farmer (1790–1854)

- Born: November 3, 1790; Warwick County, Virginia, U.S.
- Died: December 16, 1854 (aged 64); Fincastle, Virginia, U.S.
- Occupations: Farmer; landowner
- Spouses: Frances Callaway Steptoe (m. 1816; died 1832) Anne Eliza Scott (m. 1833)
- Children: 13
- Relatives: Chiswell Langhorne (grandson) George Plater Tayloe (nephew)

Henry Scarsbrook Langhorne (November 3, 1790 – December 16, 1854) was an American landowner and farmer.

== Early life ==
Langhorne was born November 3, 1790, at "Gambell", the family ancestral home in Warwick County, Virginia. Henry was the youngest of five children of John Scarsbrook Langhorne and Elizabeth Langhorne, first cousins who had married in 1782, which was customary at the time to retain family wealth. Gambell had been built in 1675 by the original Langhorne family immigrant, John Langhorne. who emigrated from Bristol, England. The colonial homestead strategically situated between Water's Creek and the James River was destroyed by fire in 1818, and the land is now home to the Mariners' Museum in Newport News.

== Career ==
Although he was first seated on some of the Cumberland County, Virginia, lands that he had inherited through his mother, he quickly resolved to move to Lynchburg with his brother Maurice. An active and keen agriculturist, the planting of tobacco was no longer as profitable as it had once been, and after an early venture at the Farm Mills in Amherst was ruined by flood in 1826, brothers Henry and Maurice erected Lynchburg Milling Co. flour mill, also known as Langhorne Mills, which was built in 1831. He never abandoned planting though, and continued to buy numerous plantations in Bedford, Campbell and Amherst Counties. Also in 1826, Henry appraised the Poplar Forest estate of Thomas Jefferson.

In 1845, he retired and relocated to "Cloverdale", the 3,500-acre Botetourt County plantation he had just purchased from his niece's husband George Plater Tayloe of Buena Vista. He continued to purchase smaller tracts and at the time of his death, he owned a total of 3,892 acres. Langhorne's Mill would be used by the Red Cross as a makeshift hospital to treat injured confederate soldiers during the American Civil War.

== Personal life ==
Langhorne was married twice and between his two wives, he was the father of thirteen children. His first marriage, in 1816, was to Frances Callaway Steptoe (1798–1832), the highly sought after daughter of Hon. James Steptoe (a close friend of Thomas Jefferson) and Frances Callaway of "Federal Hill". Beginning in 1828, Henry lived at Point of Honor, an historic mansion overlooking Blackwater Creek in Lynchburg. Together, Henry and Frances were the parents of the following children:

- John Scarsbrook Langhorne (1817–1886), who married Sarah Elizabeth Dabney of "Edgemont", a great-granddaughter of William Randolph II of "Chatesworth".
- William Maurice Langhorne (1818–1900), never married
- Elizabeth Johnston Langhorne (1821–1888), who married James Callaway Hunt (1811–1870)
- James Steptoe Langhorne (1822–1905), who married Elizabeth Rachel Omohundro (1825–1915).
- Henry Scarsbrooke Langhorne (ca.1825-1853, who died unmarried.
- Sarah Massie (Sallie) Langhorne (1826–1881, never married
- Thomas Nelson Langhorne (1828–1889), who married Orra Henderson Moore Gray (1841–1904), a writer.
- Frances (Fanny) Steptoe Langhorne (1829–1889), who died unmarried.

After the death of his first wife in 1832, Langhorne remarried in 1833 to Anne Eliza Scott (1800–1870), the daughter of Charles Scott of Buckingham County, Virginia. Together, they were the parents of:

- Charles Scott Langhorne (1836–1896), who married Katherine Page Waller (1840–1920).
- Edward Alexander Langhorne (1837–1861), who died of typhoid during the U.S. Civil War.
- George Washington Langhorne (1839–1905), who married Nannie (née Armistead) Langhorne.
- Anne Scott Langhorne (1840–1920), who married Maurice Scarsbrooke Langhorne (1823–1908).
- Mary Catherine Langhorne (1845–1924), who did not marry and became a "schoolmistress."

Henry Langhorne died on December 16, 1854, in Fincastle in Botetourt County, Virginia, and was buried at the Callaway-Steptoe Cemetery, New London in Bedford County, Virginia. His eldest son John inherited Langhorne Mills, along with the bulk of his father's estate. His son James was given the 13,000-acre "Langdale" plantation located near the border of North Carolina.
