= George Plater Tayloe =

Virginia businessman, soldier, and legislator

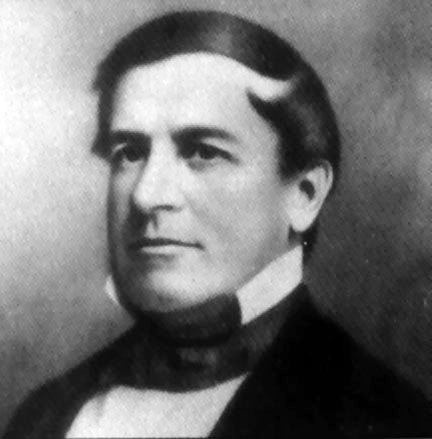
- George Plater Tayloe
- Born: October 15, 1804; Mount Airy, Richmond County, Virginia
- Died: April 18, 1897 (aged 92); Buena Vista (Roanoke, Virginia)
- Occupations: Planter, military officer
- Relatives: Henry Scarsbrook Langhorne (uncle in-law) Nancy Astor, Viscountess Astor (cousin)

George Plater Tayloe ( October 15, 1804 – Apr 18, 1897) was a Virginia businessman, soldier, and legislator who also served as one of the original trustees of Hollins University.

== Early life and education ==
George Tayloe was born October 15, 1804, at Mount Airy in Richmond County, Virginia, the ninth of fifteen children of Hon. John Tayloe III. He was born into a large aristocratic family of great wealth that had accumulated over three generations, beginning with William Tayloe (the nephew), son of the immigrant, one of the richest plantation owners and businessmen in Virginia for his generation. Considered to be the chief architect of the family fortune, he was known as the "Hon. Colonel of the Old House". The Tayloe family of Richmond County, including John Tayloe I, his son, John Tayloe II, and grandson, John Tayloe III, exemplified gentry entrepreneurship.

George Tayloe attended Princeton University.

== Early career ==
After graduating, Tayloe moved westward within Virginia to manage two iron furnaces, Catawba II and Cloverdale. These furnaces along with 1132 acres of land around Cloverdale had been purchased by the Tayloes from a Thomas Madison in 1817. George Tayloe married Mary Elizabeth Langhorne in 1830, and in 1833 he traded with his father-in-law, Colonel William Langhorne, a section of the Cloverdale property for the 598-acre Buena Vista tract.

This tract or plantation originally was known as "Roanoke" after the river which flowed at the edge of the land, but the name was changed to "Buena Vista" in 1838 when a section of lower Botetourt County became Roanoke County. Tayloe razed the Langhorne house and erected the present Greek Revival dwelling on the plantation's most commanding site. The construction date for Tayloe's house traditionally is given as 1833, the year he acquired the land, but architectural evidence indicates it is closer to 1840. In any case, the 10,783-square-foot mansion would have taken several years to build. "Buena Vista" was built of red brick said to be imported from England; the walls of the house are 18 inches thick.

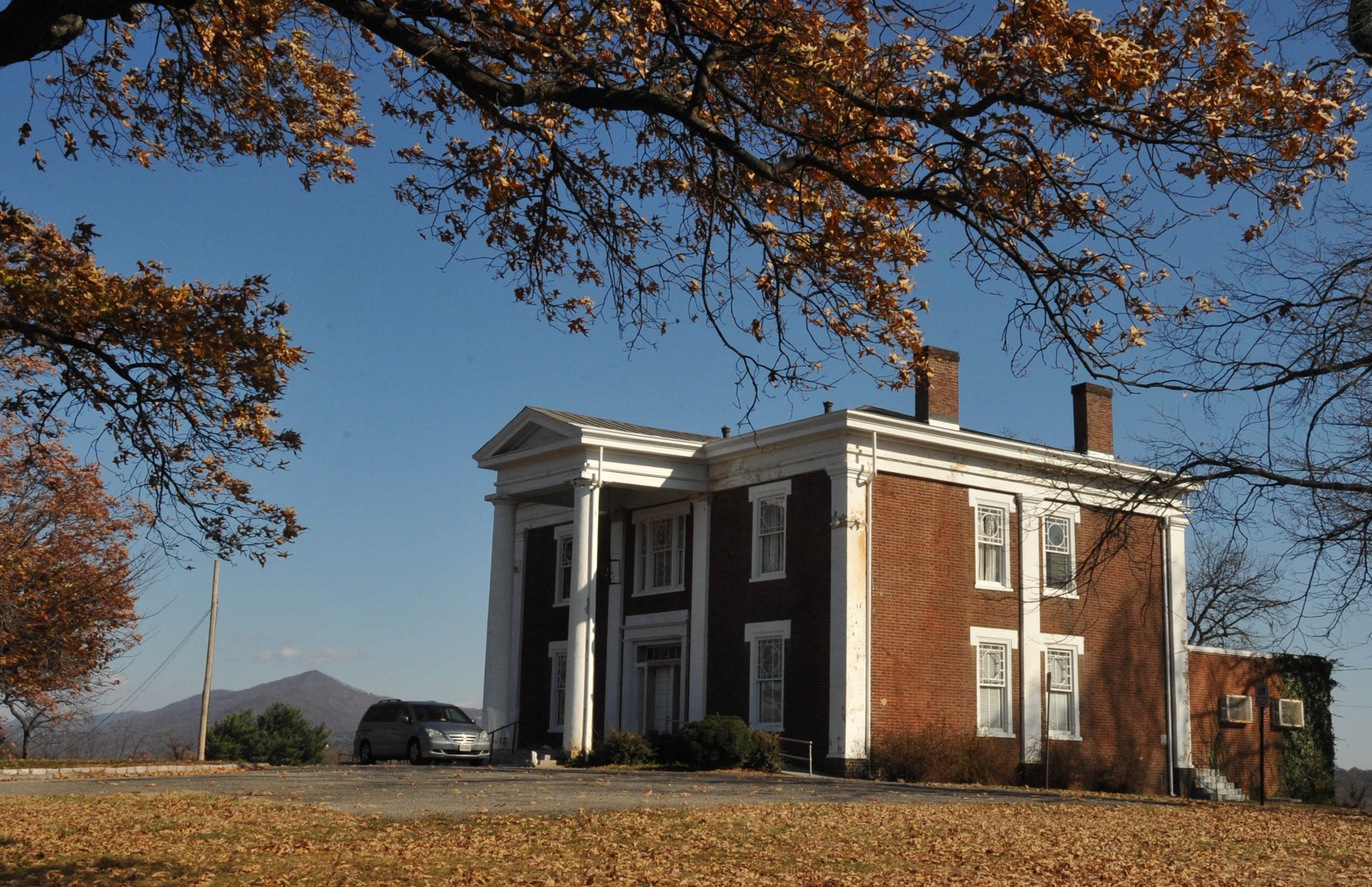
"Buena Vista", Roanoke, Virginia

== Roanoke promoter and politician ==
George Tayloe was a prominent figure in both state and local affairs. He was a charter member of the Valley Union Education Society, as well as of Roanoke College. However, Roanokers especially remember his support for Hollins University. His financial aid saw the school through difficult times and in 1844 he became one of the original thirteen members of the board of trustees. He later became chairman of its board of trustees and continued in that position until his death. Tayloe avidly promoted the City of Roanoke, particularly through the Buena Vista Land Company.

Roanoke voters elected Tayloe as their representative to the Virginia Secession Convention. Although Tayloe originally opposed secession, he signed the Ordinance of Secession.

Four of George's sons fought as Confederate soldiers. His home, Buena Vista, barely escaped burning at the hands of General David Hunter at the time of the burning of Virginia Military Institute, but was saved from destruction by a report that General Jubal Early and his staff were there.

== Later career ==
Tayloe was one of the three cotton planters who owned considerable estates in Arcola, Alabama, in 1860. Mr. Tayloe owned "Elmwood" (1,140 acres). He did not live there, however. He bought the place at public auction. He also owned the Walnut Grove plantation, some eight miles eastward on the Uniontown and Demopolis road.

All of the grandsons of Col. John Tayloe of the revolutionary time were soldiers of the Southern Confederacy. One of the sons-in-law of Mr. George P. Tayloe was Brigadier General Thomas T. Mumford of Virginia, one of the commanders of the cavalry of the Army of Northern Virginia.

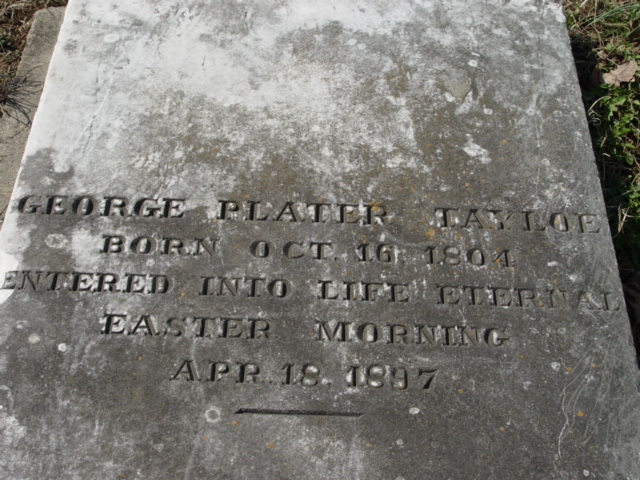
Grave of George Plater Tayloe of Buena Vista, Roanoke, VA

George died on April 18, 1897, in "Buena Vista", Roanoke Co., Virginia.

== The Octagon ==
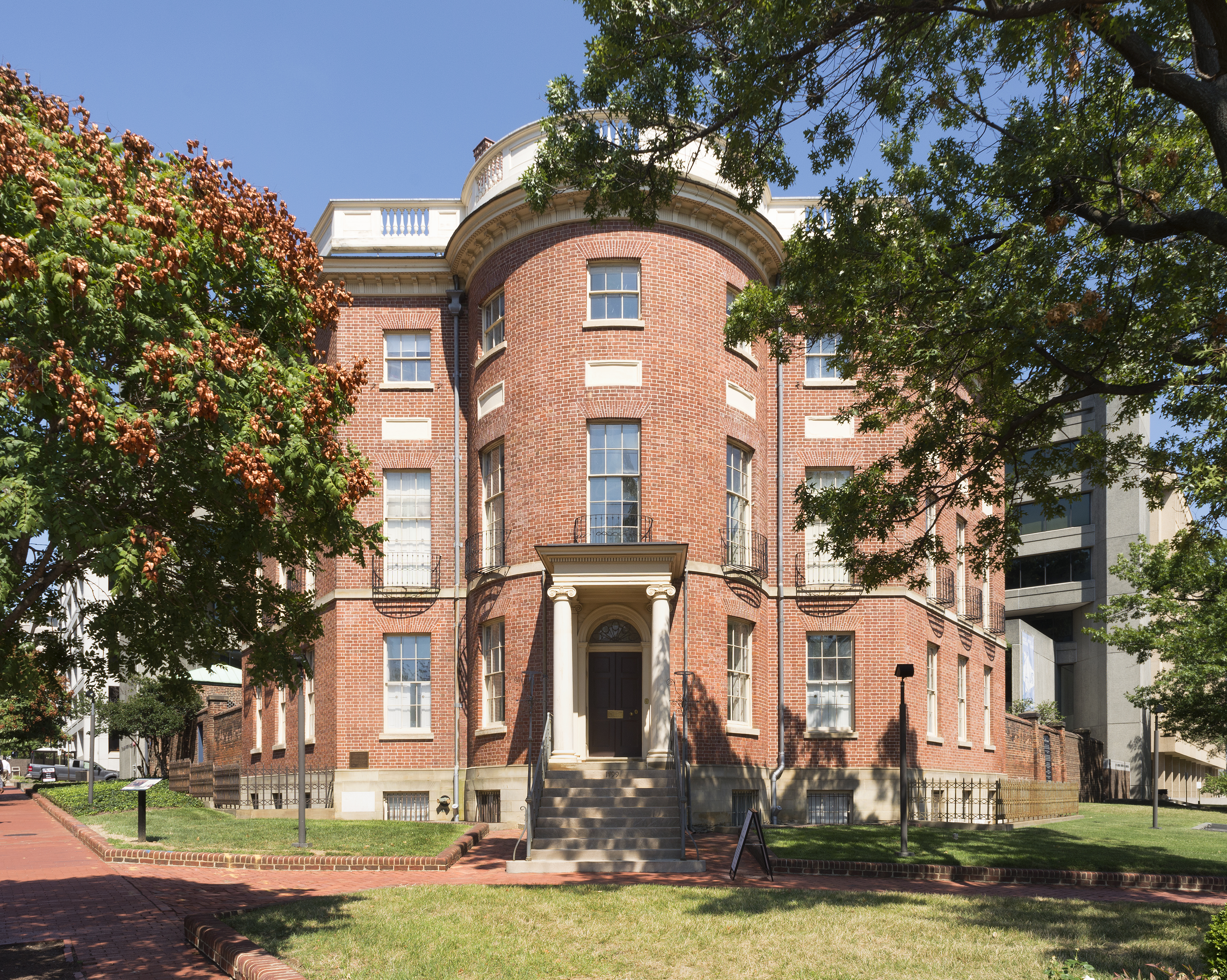
The Octagon House, Washington DC

Tayloe had very close ties to Washington, D.C. His father built the Octagon House in 1799. The Octagon was designed by Dr. William Thornton, the first architect of the U.S. Capitol. In 1814, Colonel Tayloe offered the use of his home to President James Madison and his wife, Dolley, for a temporary "Executive Mansion" after the burning of the White House by the British. Madison used the circular room above the entrance as a study and there, on February 17, 1815, he signed the Treaty of Ghent which ended the War of 1812.

Apparitions and the presence of otherworldly forces have reportedly been seen and felt in many places at The Octagon, including on the spiral staircase, the second floor landing, the third floor landing, the third floor bedroom, and the garden area in the rear. Among the eyewitnesses have been members of the public, curators and other employees hired by the museum which owns the house.

== Children ==
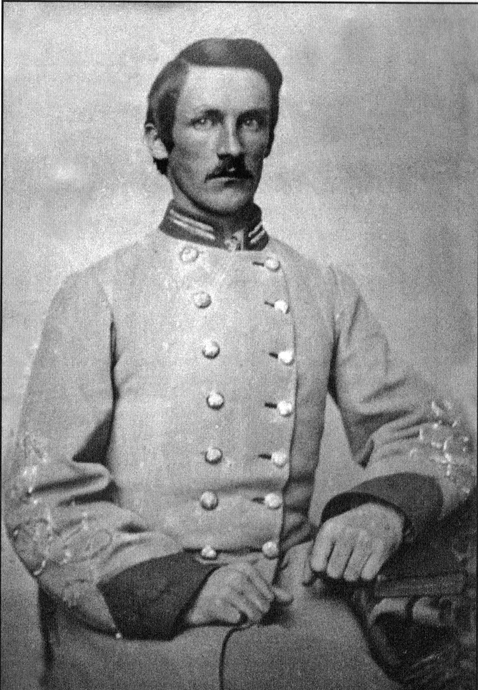
LT. James Langhorne Tayloe C.S.N.

George Tayloe had ten children:

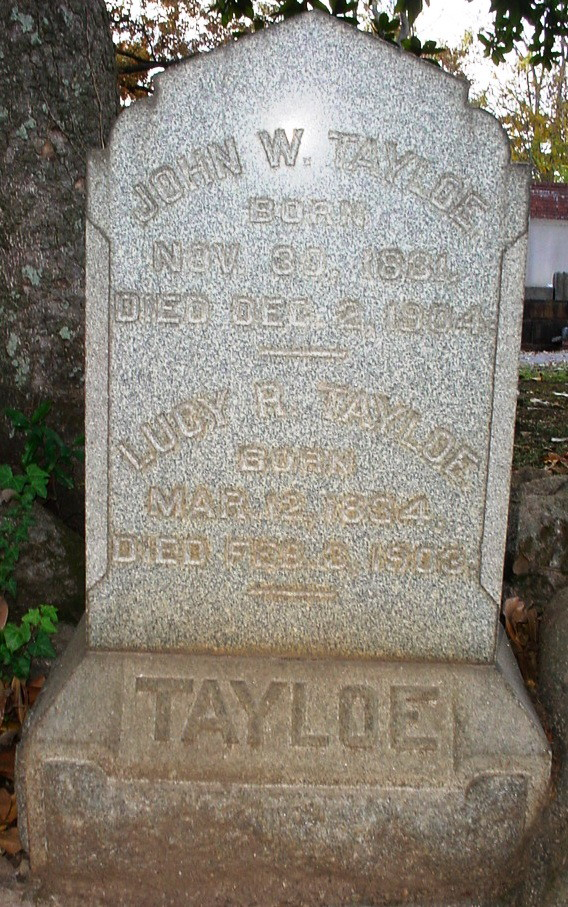
John William Tayloe

- John William Tayloe, Confederate States Army
- Elizabeth Henrietta Tayloe
- Ann Catherine Tayloe "Nannie"
- Mary Lavinia Tayloe
- George Edward Tayloe, Confederate States Army
- Rose Matilda Tayloe
- James Langhorne Tayloe, Confederate States Navy – Killed in the Battle of Hampton Roads
- Lomax Tayloe, Confederate States Army
- Henry Wharton Tayloe
- Virginia "Jenny" Tayloe

== Ancestry ==
Ancestors of George Plater Tayloe

16. William Tayloe (the nephew)
8. Col John Tayloe I
17. Ann Corbin
4. Col John Tayloe II
18. David Gwynn
9. Elizabeth Gwynn
19. Kathrine Griffin
2. Col John Tayloe III
20. George Plater I
10. George Plater II
21. Ann Rousby Burford
5. Rebecca Plater Tayloe
22. Colonel Thomas A. Addison, I
11. Rebecca Addison Bowles
23. Elizabeth Tasker
1. George Plater Tayloe
24. Samuel Ogle
12. Samuel Ogle
25. Ursula Markham
6. Benjamin Ogle
26. Benjamin Tasker Sr.
13. Anne Tasker
27. Ann Bladen
3. Ann Ogle
28. Joseph Hill
14. Henry Hill
29. Sarah Richardson
7. Henrietta Margaret Hill
30. Philip Thomas
15. Mary Thomas
31. Ann Chew
