= Louis Agassiz Shaw II =

American socialite and writer (1906–1987)

- Born: 1906
- Died: 1987 (aged 80–81)
- Occupations: Socialite, writer, murderer
- Parent(s): Robert Gould Shaw II; Mary Hannington

Louis Agassiz Shaw II (1906–1987) was an American socialite, writer and murderer.

== Biography ==
Shaw was born to Robert Gould Shaw II and Mary Hannington; the Shaws were a wealthy and influential Boston family. His father was a cousin of Colonel Robert Gould Shaw, noted for leading an African-American regiment in the Union Army during the Civil War.

He attended private school and Harvard University, where he graduated in 1929. Like Robert Gould Shaw, he was a member of the Porcellian Club, a men's-only final club at Harvard.

Upon graduation Shaw published a novel, Pavement (1929), using his nickname "Louis Second" as a pen name. He lived in a sprawling 15-room mansion in Topsfield, a town founded by the Gould family. According to Alex Beam's Gracefully Insane (a history of McLean Hospital, where Shaw spent the last years of his life) Shaw kept a copy of the Social Register next to the telephone and instructed his staff to refuse calls from anyone not listed. He often rode his horse along a bridle path from his estate, and through the area now known as the Ipswich River Wildlife Sanctuary, in order to reach the Myopia Hunt Club.

Like his elder half-brother Robert Gould Shaw III, Shaw struggled with depression and alcoholism. In 1964 he strangled his 64-year-old maid, who he said was plotting to murder him in his sleep. He confessed but pleaded not guilty; he was committed to Danvers State Hospital and later McLean Hospital, where he lived for 23 years.

Much of his art collection, which he intended to donate to the Fogg Museum, was discovered to be fakes.

== Bibliography ==
- Pavement (1929)
