= Langhorne House =

Historic house in Virginia, United States

- U.S. National Register of Historic Places
- U.S. Historic district – Contributing property
- Virginia Landmarks Register
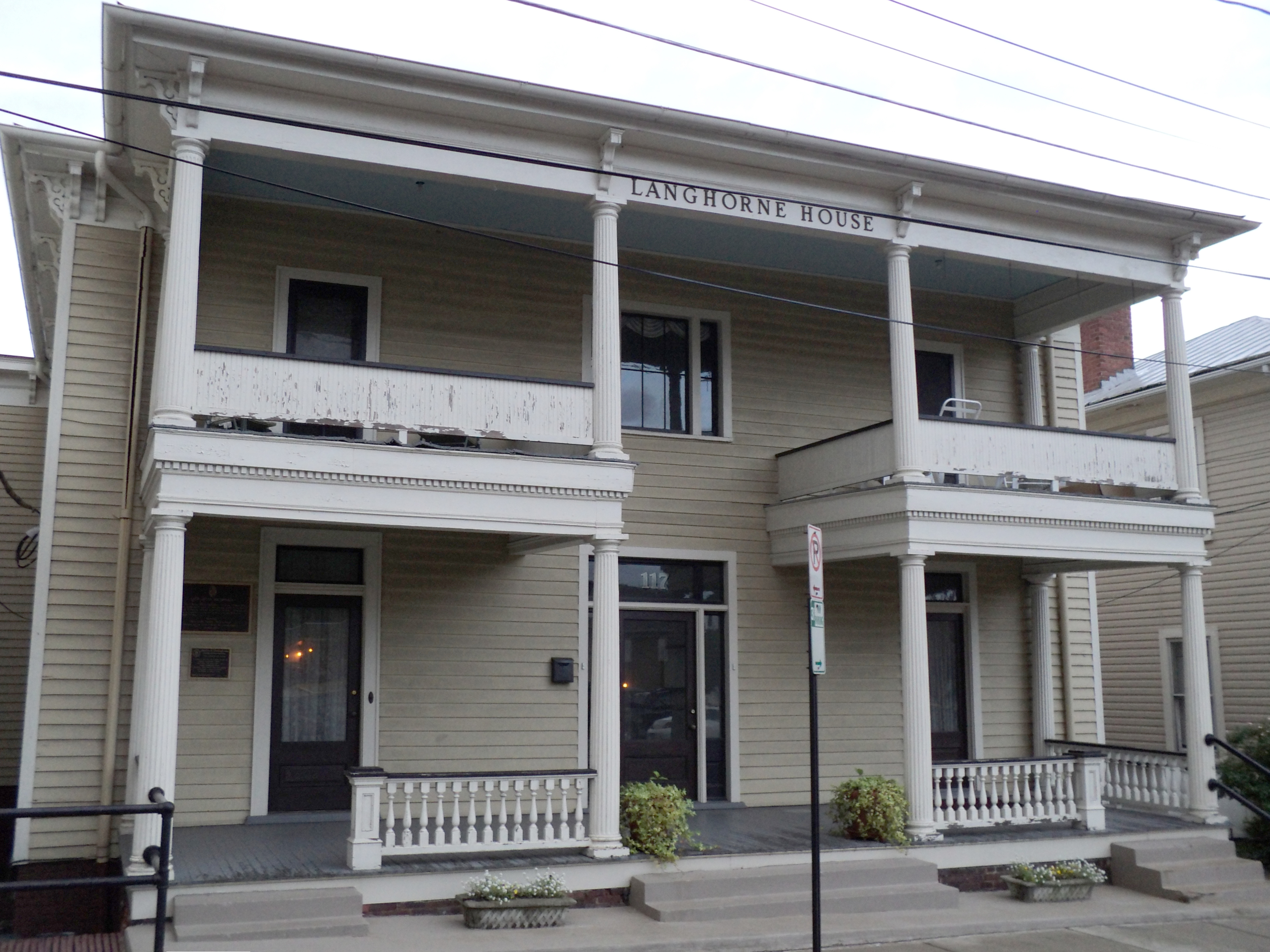
- Langhorne House, May 2010

- Location within Virginia Location within the United States
- Location: 117 Broad St., Danville, Virginia
- Coordinates: 36°34′48″N 79°24′12″W
- Area: 0.1 acres (0.040 ha)
- Built: 1874, 1878, 1921, 1922
- Architectural style: Central Passage, Italianate, Classical Revival
- Part of: Danville Historic District (ID73002207)
- NRHP reference No.: 05001586
- VLR No.: 108-0064

Significant dates
- Added to NRHP: February 1, 2006
- Designated CP: April 11, 1973
- Designated VLR: December 7, 2005

Langhorne House, also known as the Gwynn Apartments, is an historic late 19th-century house in Danville, Virginia later enlarged and used as an apartment house. Its period of significance is 1922, when Nancy Langhorne Astor, by then known as Lady Astor and the first woman to sit in the British Parliament, came to Danville to visit her birthplace and promote Anglo-American relations.

== History ==
The original dwelling was built in 1874 as a one-story, central-passage plan structure with a rear ell. It was enlarged in 1878 to add a second story and Italianate-style porch. In 1921, the house was moved to the next lot and further enlarged, with conversion for use as four apartments. The house was attached to a three-story apartment building constructed at its original site. The front facade features a two-tier porch with fluted Doric columns in the Classical Revival style and multiple entries. In 1990, the structure was restored to its appearance in 1922, when Lady Astor made a speech to 5,000 people from the second-story porch of the house.

Named after Civil War veteran and business magnate Chiswell Langhorne, the dwelling was the birthplace of his and his wife's several daughters, all noted for their beauty. Nancy Langhorne (1879-1964) moved to England as a young woman, married Waldorf Astor and won his former seat in the British Parliament in 1919. She returned to Virginia in 1922 to visit her birthplace and to promote relations between the important allies. Her visit to Danville received national coverage in the United States and is significant in local history.

The building was listed on the National Register of Historic Places in 2006. Owned by the Lady Astor Preservation Trust, it is located in the Danville Historic District and is open to the public on Saturday afternoons or by appointment.
