= Chiswell Langhorne =

American industrialist (1843–1919)

Chiswell Dabney Langhorne
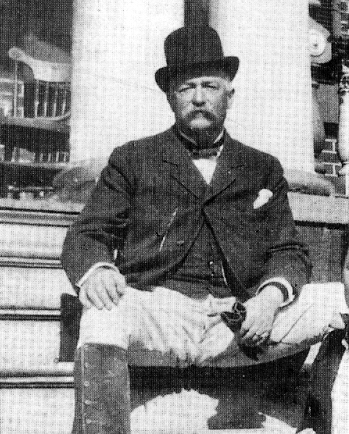
- Born: November 4, 1843; Lynchburg, Virginia, United States
- Died: February 14, 1919 (aged 75); Richmond, Virginia, United States
- Occupations: Auctioneer, industrialist
- Spouse: Nancy Witcher Keene (m. 1864; died 1903)
- Children: 11, including Nancy
- Parent(s): John Scarsbrook Langhorne; Sarah Elizabeth Dabney
- Relatives: Henry Scarsbrook Langhorne (grandfather)

Colonel Chiswell Dabney Langhorne (November 4, 1843 – February 14, 1919) was an American railroad industrialist. He was the father of Nancy Witcher Langhorne and the maternal grandfather of both Joyce Grenfell and Michael Langhorne Astor.

== Early life ==
Langhorne was born on November 4, 1843, in Lynchburg, Virginia, at Point of Honor. He was the eldest son of John Scarsbrook Langhorne and Sarah Elizabeth (née Dabney) Langhorne.

His father inherited Langhorne Mills in Lynchburg along with the bulk of his father Henry's property. His maternal family owned the Edgemont plantation. The family had been wealthy planters and slaveowners before the American Civil War. The Confederate General Jeb Stuart was a relative.

The Langhorne family lived in greatly reduced circumstances after the war. However, during the next quarterncentury, "Chilly" made a new fortune by working first in the tobacco auctioneering business and then in railroads.

== Career ==
As a young man, Langhorne served briefly in the Confederate Army before being discharged for disability in October 1861. Soon after the Civil War, he moved to Danville, Virginia, a major center for bright leaf tobacco. The sale of loose-leaf tobacco by auction on a warehouse floor had originated there just before the Civil War. The practice, which was called the "Danville System", was quickly and widely adopted. It is said that Langhorne originated the auctioneer's fast-talking "chant," which proved very effective at evoking a heightened sense of bidding, and was also copied everywhere.

Through the influence of his wartime commanding officer, he landed a construction contract with the Chesapeake and Ohio Railway. This was the start of his building a railroad fortune.

== Personal life ==
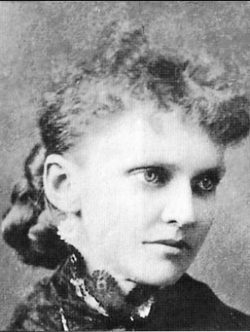
Langhorne's wife, Nancy Witcher Keene.

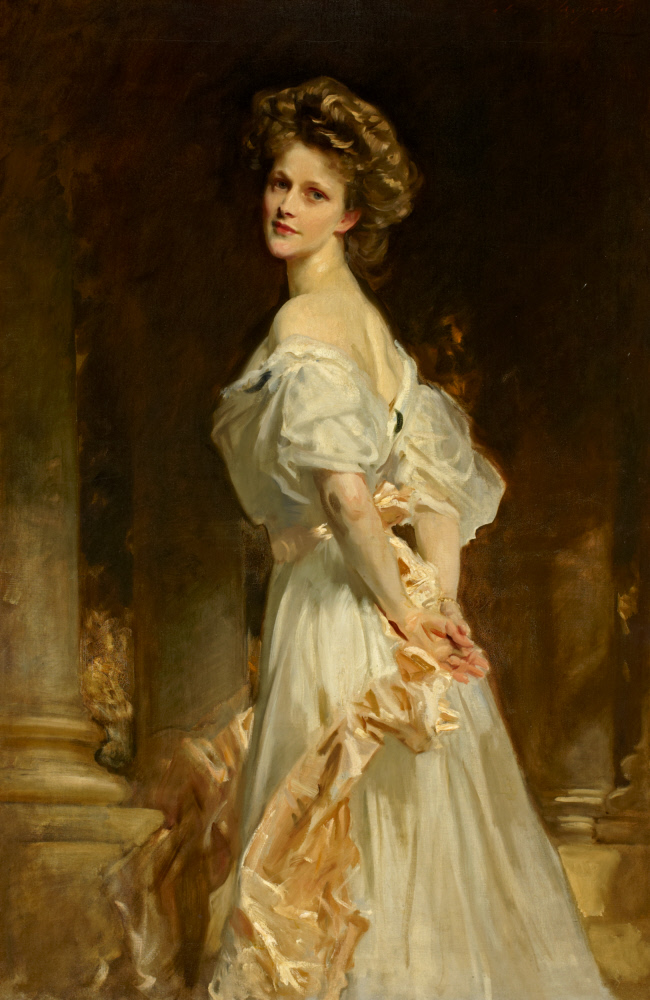
Langhorne's daughter, Nancy, Lady Astor.

In 1864, while the Civil War was still in progress, Langhorne married sixteen-year-old Nancy Witcher "Nanaire" Keene (1848–1903). Together, they had a total of eleven children; eight of whom survived childhood (three children, John, Mary, and Chiswell Jr., were born and died in infancy between 1870 and 1872), including:

- Elizabeth "Lizzie" Dabney Langhorne (1867–1914), who married Thomas Moncure Perkins.
- Elisha Keene Langhorne (1869–1916), who married Sadie Reynolds. After his death, she married Perkins Ellis.
- Irene Langhorne (1873–1956), who married to American illustrator Charles Dana Gibson, creator of the "Gibson Girl", an iconic image of the early 20th century, and later owner of Life magazine.
- Harry Langhorne (1874–1907), who married to Genevieve Peyton.
- Nancy Langhorne (1879–1964), who married Robert Gould Shaw II. They divorced and she remarried to Waldorf Astor, 2nd Viscount Astor, eldest son of William Waldorf Astor, 1st Viscount Astor and Mary Dahlgren Paul.
- Phyllis Langhorne (1880—1937), who married Robert Brand, 1st Baron Brand.
- William "Buck" Henry Langhorne (1886–1938), who married Edith Forsyth.
- Nora Langhorne (1889—1955), who married British architect Paul Phipps (1880–1953) and were the parents of actress Joyce Grenfell, and, later, Maurice Flynn.

In 1885, by which time they had at least six surviving children, he moved his family to Richmond. By 1892, he had installed his family at Mirador, a colonnaded house in Albemarle County, at the foot of the Blue Ridge Mountains.

Langhorne died on February 14, 1919, in Richmond, Virginia following an illness of several weeks. He was buried in Hollywood Cemetery, in Richmond. In 2006, the Langhorne House in Danville was listed under the U.S. National Register of Historic Places in Virginia.

=== Descendants ===
Through his eldest daughter Lizzie, he was the grandfather of Nancy Lancaster (née Nancy Keene Perkins), who married three times (including to Ronald Tree and Claude Lancaster) and became a noted interior decorator. Through daughter Irene, he was the grandfather of Irene Langhorne Gibson (wife of John J. Emery) and Langhorne Gibson.

Through her daughter Nancy, he was the grandfather of Robert Gould Shaw III, William Astor, 3rd Viscount Astor, Nancy Phyllis Louise Astor, Francis David Langhorne Astor, Michael Langhorne Astor, and John Jacob Astor VII.

Through his youngest daughter Nora, he was the grandfather of Joyce Irene Phipps, who became an actress/comedian, and Thomas Wilton Phipps, a scriptwriter.
