= Pauline Agassiz Shaw =

Swiss-born American philanthropist, social reformer

- Born: Pauline Agassiz; February 6, 1841; Neuchâtel, Switzerland
- Died: February 10, 1917 (aged 76); Boston, Massachusetts, U.S.
- Resting place: Forest Hills Cemetery, Boston
- Known for: Philanthropist; Social reformer; Suffragist
- Spouse: Quincy Adams Shaw
- Children: Louis Agassiz Shaw; Pauline Shaw; Marian Shaw; Quincy Adams Shaw; Robert Gould Shaw II
- Parent(s): Louis Agassiz; Cecilie Braun

Pauline Agassiz Shaw (February 6, 1841 – February 10, 1917) was an American philanthropist and social reformer who opened day nurseries, settlement houses, and other establishments in Boston to help new immigrants and the poor. She financed public kindergartens (one decade later this concept was adopted by the Boston Public Schools), and co-founded America's first trade school, the North Bennet Street School. She was also a vocal advocate for women's rights.

== Biography ==
Pauline Agassiz was born in Neuchâtel, Switzerland on February 6, 1841. Her father was the Swiss naturalist Louis Agassiz. In 1850, she moved with her family to Cambridge, Massachusetts, where her father was a professor of zoology and geology at Harvard University. It was in the United States, her father remarried Elizabeth Cabot Cary, co-founder of Radcliffe College. Her step-mother was a huge influence on Pauline's life.

In 1860, at the age of 19, Pauline married Quincy Adams Shaw. They had five children: Pauline, Marian, Louis Agassiz Shaw, Sr., Quincy Adams, and Robert Gould II.

Married to a wealthy investor from a well known Boston Brahmin family, Pauline Agassiz Shaw used her newfound wealth and social status to help Boston's poor. At the time, thousands of mostly Irish, Jewish, and Italian immigrants had moved to Boston's North End, many of them poor, unskilled, and non-fluent in English. To provide them with job training, she co-founded America's first trade school, the North Bennet Street Industrial School (later renamed the North Bennet Street School), which is still operating in the North End. Working with her good friend Elizabeth Palmer Peabody, she funded fourteen public kindergartens from 1878 and giving public demonstrations of their usefulness. The Boston Public Schools would formally adopt the model in the late 1880s. She opened "day nurseries", or day care centers, to provide a safe environment for the children of working women, and "neighborhood houses" in Boston and Cambridge where families received social services. These neighborhood houses, or settlement houses, were unusual for their time in that all area residents were welcome regardless of race. One, the Margaret Fuller Neighborhood House, is still in operation today. Other included: Cottage Place Neighborhood House, 1876; Children's House (now Roxbury Neighborhood House), 1878; Moore Street Neighborhood House, 1879; Ruggles Street Neighborhood House, 1879; North Bennett Street Industrial School, 1881; Civic Service House, 1901; and Social Service House, 1902 establishment.

A strong advocate of women's rights, she served as president of the Boston Equal Suffrage Association for Good Government for 16 years, and supported the Woman's Journal, a weekly suffrage newspaper. She and her husband also advocated for prison reform.

She died of bronchial pneumonia on February 10, 1917, at her home in Jamaica Plain. She is memorialized at two different sites on the Boston Women's Heritage Trail, one on the North End Walk and another on the Jamaica Plain walk. The Pauline Agassiz Shaw Elementary School in Boston is named in her honor. She is featured on two walks given by the Jamaica Plain Historical Society: The Monument Square tour which passes the plaque memorializing one of her first kindergartens and the Jamaica Pond tour which passes her home on the shores of the Pond.

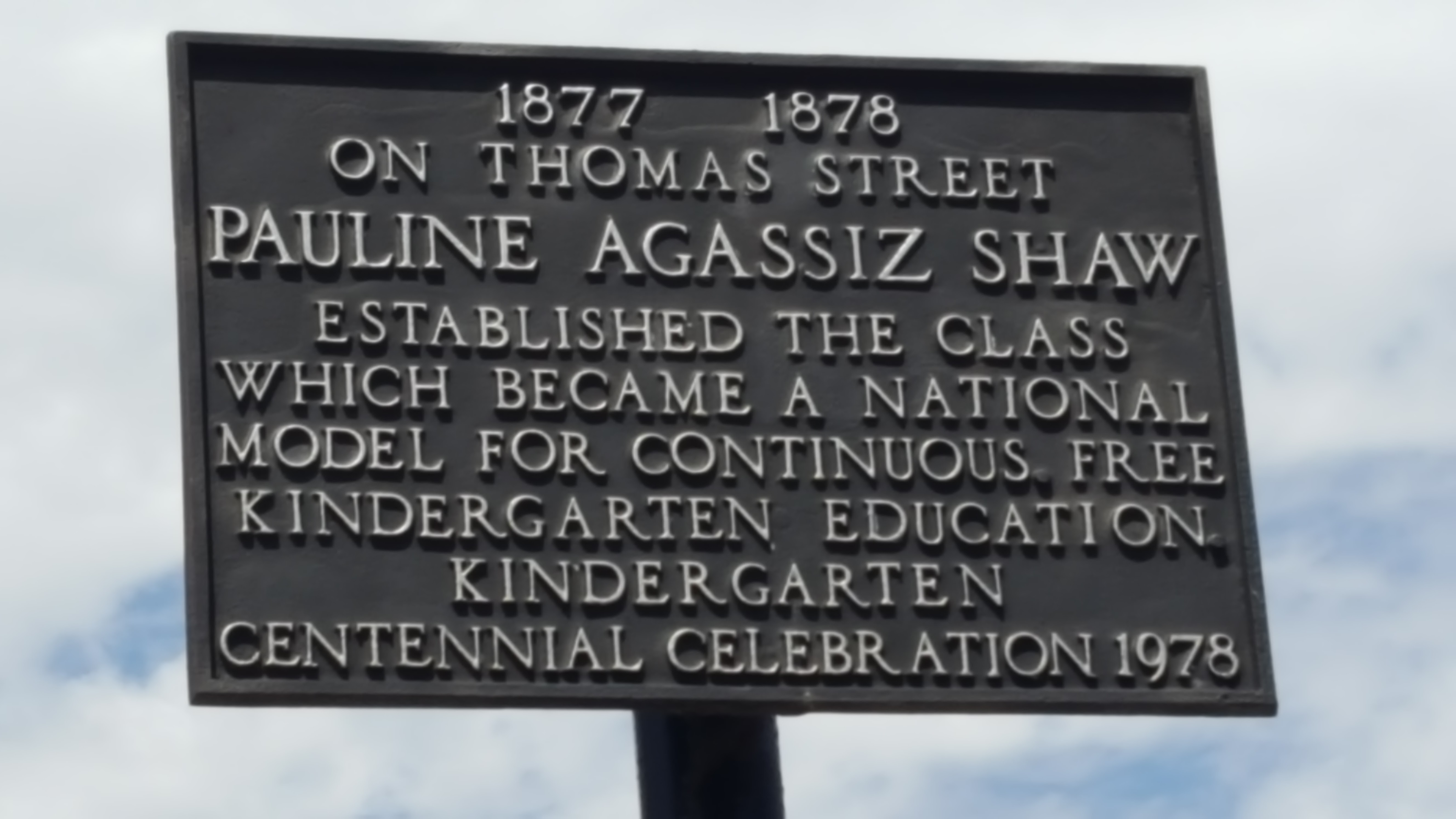
Plaque at Centre and Thomas Street, Jamaica Plain memorializing the site of one of Shaw's first kindergartens.
