= Buena Vista (Roanoke, Virginia) =

Historic house in Virginia, United States

- U.S. National Register of Historic Places
- Virginia Landmarks Register
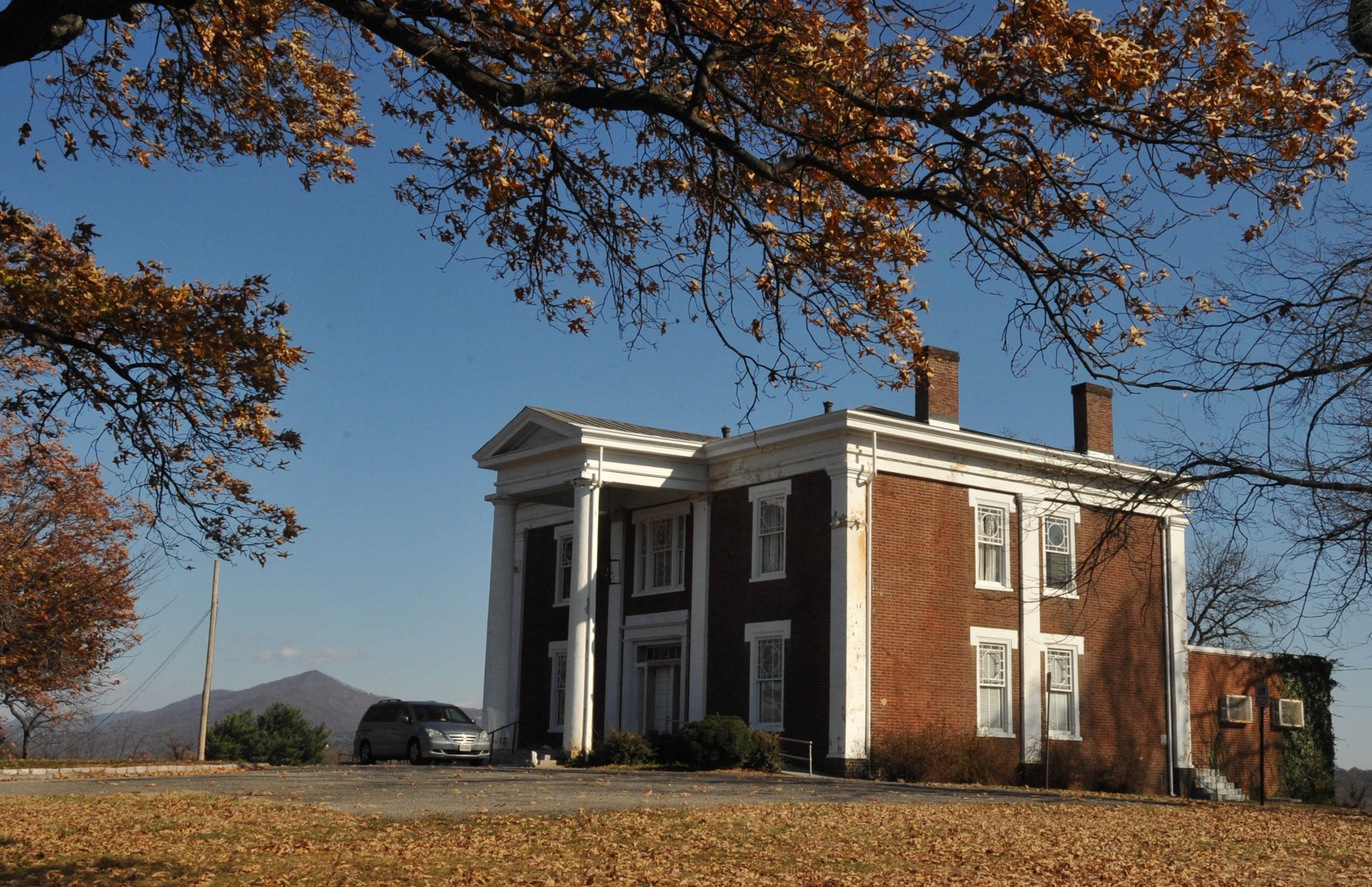
- Buena Vista in 2014

- Location within Virginia Location within the United States
- Location: Penmar Ave. and 9th St., Roanoke, Virginia
- Coordinates: 37°15′50″N 79°55′28″W
- Area: 20 acres (8.1 ha)
- Built: c. 1840; 186 years ago
- Architectural style: Greek Revival
- NRHP reference No.: 74002244
- VLR No.: 128-0001

Significant dates
- Added to NRHP: July 30, 1974
- Designated VLR: January 15, 1974

Buena Vista is a historic plantation house located in Roanoke, Virginia. It was built about 1840, and is a two-story, brick Greek Revival style dwelling with a shallow hipped roof and two-story, three-bay wing. The front facade features a massive two-story diastyle Greek Doric order portico. Buena Vista was built for George Plater Tayloe and his wife, Mary (Langhorne) Tayloe. George was the son of John Tayloe III and Anne Ogle Tayloe of the noted plantation Mount Airy in Richmond County and who built The Octagon House in Washington D.C. The property was acquired by the City of Roanoke in 1937, and was used as a city park and recreation center.

It was listed on the National Register of Historic Places in 1974.
