= Robert Gould Shaw III =

American-born English socialite (1898–1970)

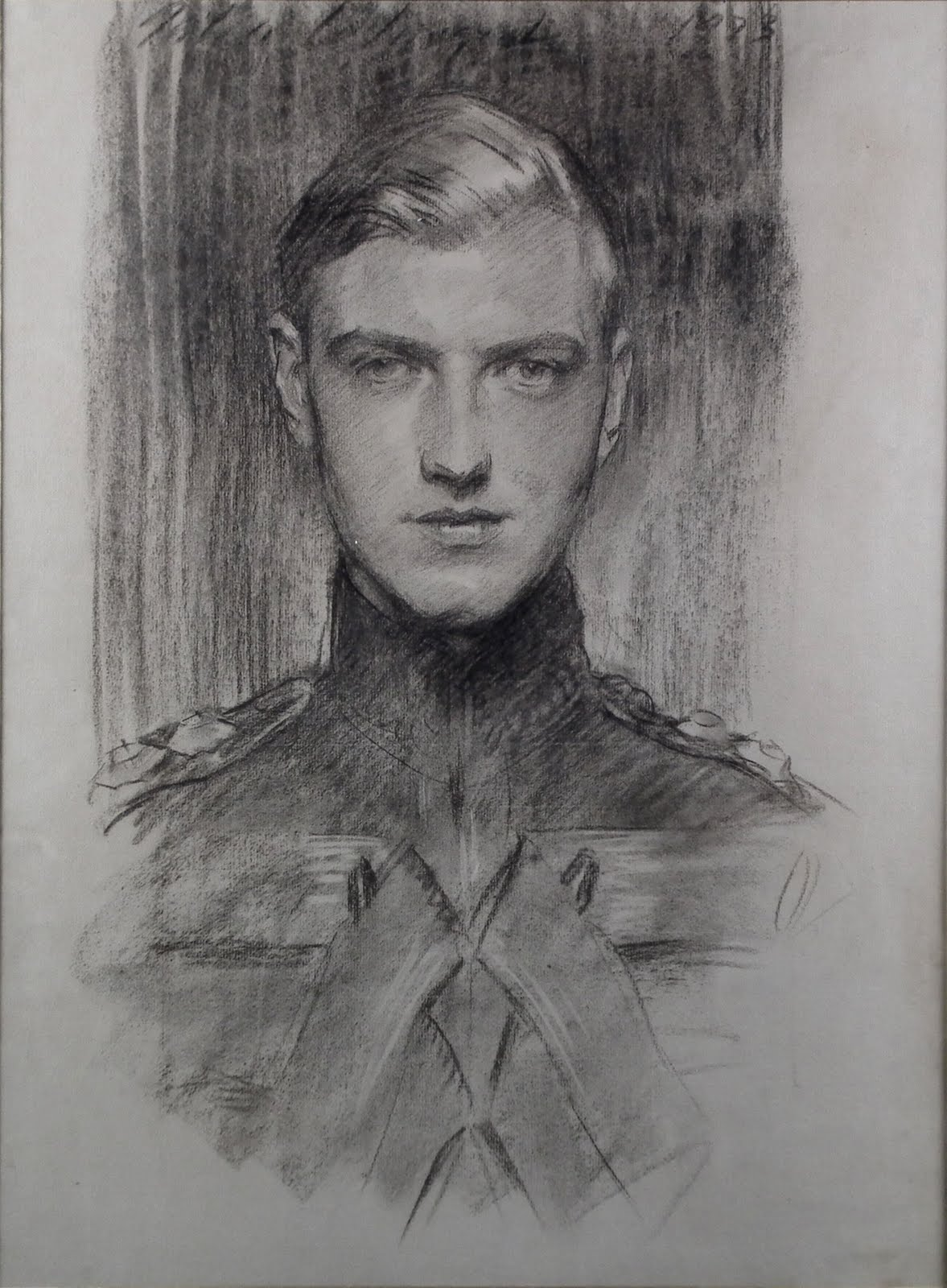
- Charcoal drawing of Shaw by John Singer Sargent
- Born: 18 August 1898; Beverly, Massachusetts, US
- Died: 10 July 1970 (aged 71); London, England
- Education: Shrewsbury School
- Partner: Alfred Edward Goodey
- Parent(s): Robert Gould Shaw II; Nancy Witcher Langhorne

Robert Gould Shaw III (18 August 1898 – 10 July 1970) was an American-born English socialite. He was the only child of Nancy Witcher Langhorne and Robert Gould Shaw II, a landowner and socialite. After his parents' divorce in 1903, he moved to England with his mother Nancy, who later married Waldorf Astor, 2nd Viscount Astor and became the first woman in Britain to take her seat as a member of parliament.

== Life ==
Robert Gould Shaw III was born on 18 August 1898 in Beverly, Massachusetts. Through his father, he was a grandson of investor Quincy Adams Shaw and cousin of Civil War Union casualty Colonel Robert Gould Shaw. His maternal grandparents were railroad millionaire Chiswell Dabney Langhorne and Nancy Witcher (née Keene) Langhorne.

Robert Gould Shaw III's father had a limited role in his life while he had a close, if occasionally difficult, relationship with his mother. His parents divorced in 1903, and in 1904 he moved to England with his mother Nancy where she married Waldorf Astor, 2nd Viscount Astor in 1906, with whom she had five more children, including William Astor, 3rd Viscount Astor. In 1919, she was the first woman to take her seat as Member of Parliament and served as MP for Plymouth until 1945.

After moving to England, Robert Gould Shaw III was educated at Shrewsbury School. He was commissioned from the Royal Military College into the Royal Horse Guards as a second lieutenant on 21 December 1917, and was transferred to the Guards Machine Gun Regiment on 12 August 1918. He ceased to be employed with that regiment on 31 January 1919, and was promoted to lieutenant in the Royal Horse Guards on 21 June 1919. On 9 March 1920 he was transferred to the Royal Horse Guards' Reserve of Officers, but he rejoined the regular establishment of the regiment on 24 September 1921. However, his increasing alcoholism caused difficulty, and he retired, still in the rank of lieutenant, on 17 July 1929.

=== Troubles and death ===
Robert Gould Shaw III had long had suicidal tendencies and his life mostly went adrift from an early point. In 1931, he was imprisoned for six months for homosexual offences, and his name was removed from the Army List on 17 July 1931. His alcoholism, his mother's death, and the death of his half-brother William in 1966 may have increased his suicidal tendencies. He killed himself on 10 July 1970. His ashes are buried in the Octagon Temple, the estate chapel of Cliveden.

John Singer Sargent did a 1923 charcoal portrait of Shaw in his military uniform. His mother gave the portrait to Alfred E. Goodey, art collector and Shaw's partner, and it was later sold in England in 2011 for £23,000.
