= Quincy Adams Shaw =

American business magnate and art collector (1825–1908)

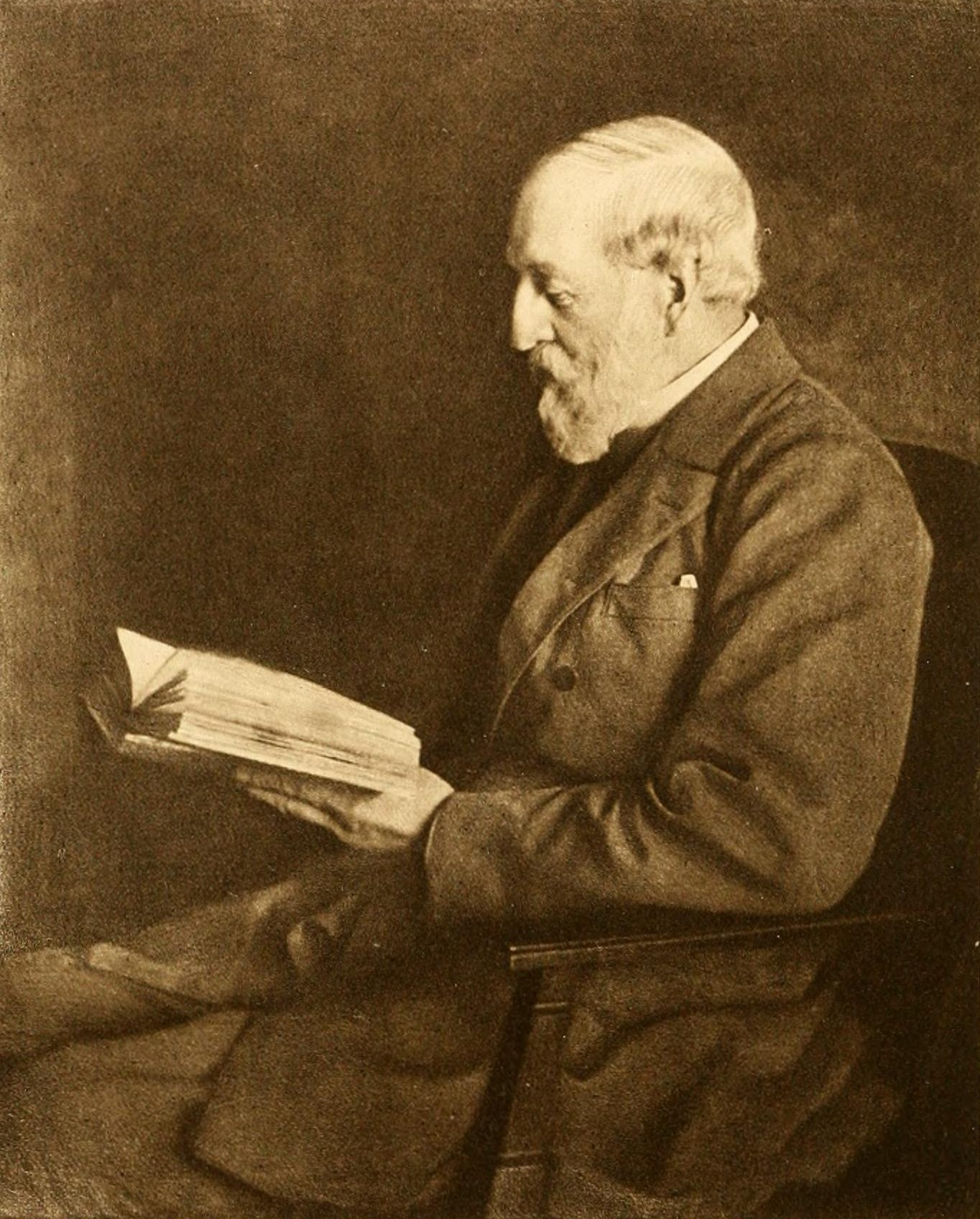
- Born: February 8, 1825; Boston, Massachusetts, U.S.
- Died: June 12, 1908 (aged 83); Boston, Massachusetts, U.S.
- Resting place: Forest Hills Cemetery, Jamaica Plain, Massachusetts, U.S.
- Spouse: Pauline Agassiz (m. 1860)
- Children: 5, including Robert Gould Shaw II

Signature
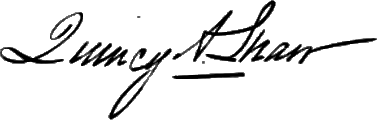

Quincy Adams Shaw (February 8, 1825 – June 12, 1908) was a Boston Brahmin investor and business magnate who was the first president of Calumet and Hecla Mining Company.

== Family and early life ==
Shaw came from a famous and moneyed Boston family. With a net worth of $1,000,000 in 1846 (equivalent to $34,996,000 in 2024), Shaw's father, Robert Gould Shaw (1776–1853), was one of the wealthiest men in Boston. His mother was Elizabeth Willard Parkman (March 31, 1785 – April 14, 1853), whose father Samuel Parkman (August 22, 1751 – June 11, 1824) was the original source of capital upon which her husband built one of the wealthiest and largest business enterprises in Boston at that time. George Parkman (February 19, 1790 – November 23, 1849), a wealthy Boston physician who was murdered in 1849 in a gruesome and highly publicized case, was Elizabeth's brother.

Shaw was good friends with his cousin, American historian Francis Parkman Junior (September 16, 1823 – November 8, 1893), and the pair travelled together to the American West after graduating from Harvard University in 1845. Parkman's 1849 book, The Oregon Trail: Sketches of Prairie and Rocky-Mountain Life, is dedicated to Shaw.

Shaw's older brother Francis George Shaw (October 23, 1809 – November 7, 1882) was an outspoken advocate of the abolition of slavery. Shaw's nephew, son of Francis George, was Robert Gould Shaw (October 10, 1837 – July 18, 1863). The latter was a colonel in the Volunteer Army of the United States during the American Civil War, and commander of the all-black 54th Regiment. Colonel Robert Gould Shaw was killed in action during the Second Battle of Fort Wagner in 1863.

== Later life ==
On November 30, 1860, Shaw married Pauline Agassiz (February 6, 1841 – February 10, 1917), daughter of Louis Agassiz and the step daughter of Elizabeth Cabot Cary. They had five children: Pauline, Marian, Louis Agassiz Shaw, Sr. (September 18, 1861 – July 2, 1891), Quincy Adams Shaw, Jr. (July 30, 1869 – May 8, 1960), and Robert Gould Shaw II (1873–1930).

Shaw's grandson, Louis Agassiz Shaw, Jr., is credited along with Philip Drinker for inventing the Drinker respirator, the first widely used iron lung.

== Career ==
Shaw and his brother-in-law Henry Lee Higginson (1834–1919) became major investors in the Calumet and Hecla Mining Company, and Shaw was the first president of the company. Shaw retained that position for only a few months before Alexander Emanuel Agassiz (another brother-in-law) took over.

In his Boston Daily Globe obituary, Shaw was named "the heaviest individual taxpayer in Massachusetts" and "the head of the family whose members in various ways have done much to promote the educational and commercial interests of Boston."
