= Robert Gould Shaw II =

American landowner and socialite (1872–1930)

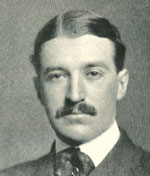
- Born: June 16, 1872; Boston, Massachusetts, U.S.
- Died: March 29, 1930 (aged 57); New York City, New York, U.S.
- Burial place: Forest Hills Cemetery, Jamaica Plain, Massachusetts, U.S.
- Occupations: Landowner, socialite
- Spouses: Nancy Witcher Langhorne (m. 1897; div. 1903) Mary Hannington (after 1903)
- Children: 5, including Robert III and Louis
- Parent(s): Quincy Adams Shaw; Pauline Agassiz

Signature
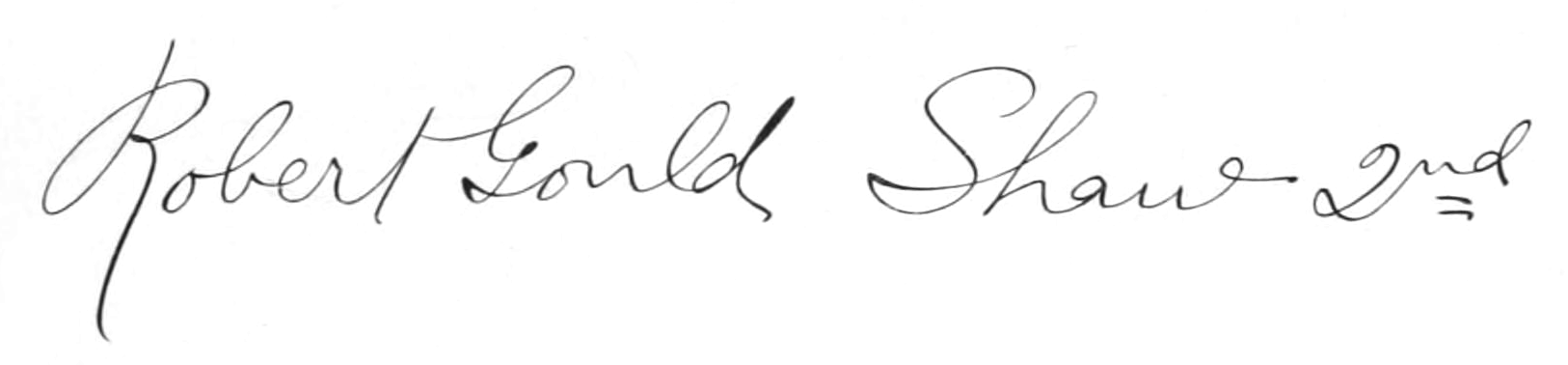

Robert Gould Shaw II (sometimes referred to as RGS II) (June 16, 1872 – March 29, 1930) was a wealthy landowner, international polo player of the Myopia Hunt Club and socialite in the greater Boston area of Massachusetts. He was one of the prominent figures of the boom years at the turn of the century, sometimes called the Gilded Age.

Born in 1872 into one of the wealthiest and most influential families in Boston, he was a first cousin of Civil War soldier Robert Gould Shaw. As an adult, RGS II gained a reputation for alcohol abuse and promiscuity. His first wife was Nancy Witcher Langhorne, and they had a son, Robert Gould Shaw III (called RGS III or "Bobby"). RGS II and Langhorne divorced after four years of marriage. She moved to England after some time, where she met and married Waldorf Astor, who later succeeded his father as Viscount. RGS II married again and had four other sons, including Louis Agassiz Shaw II.

== Early life ==
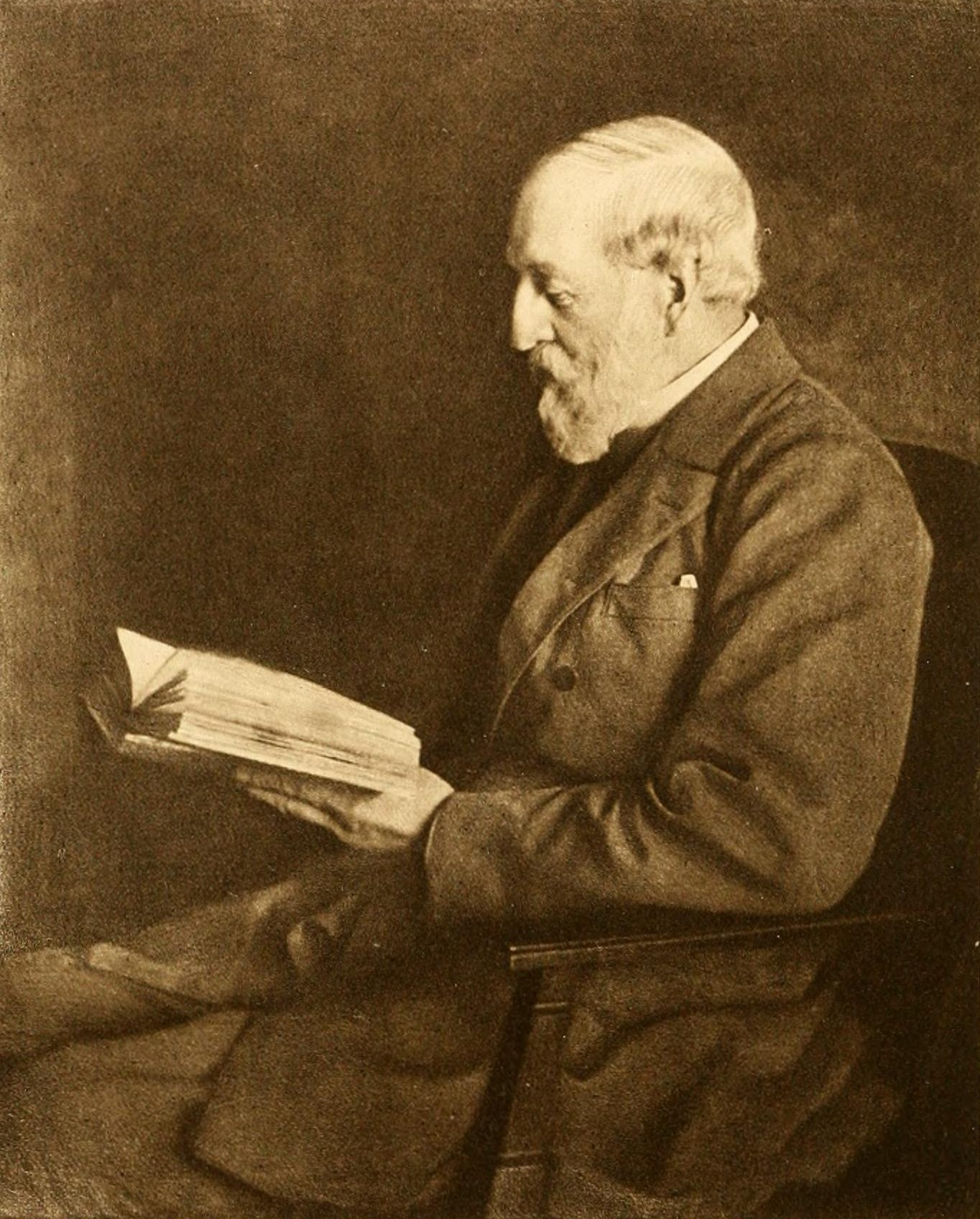
Quincy Adams Shaw, father of RGS II

RGS II was the youngest child of Quincy Adams Shaw and Pauline (née Agassiz) Shaw. Quincy was one of the wealthiest men in Massachusetts as a result of his investment in the Calumet and Hecla Mining Company. RGS II's four older siblings were Louis, Pauline, Marian, and Quincy Jr.

Quincy's side of the family had Anglo-American roots extending back to passengers on the Mayflower. His paternal grandparents were Robert G. Shaw and Elizabeth Willard (née Parkman) Shaw. His maternal grandfather, Louis Agassiz, was a prominent paleontologist, glaciologist, geologist, and scholar of the Earth's natural history who immigrated from Switzerland in 1846.

Shaw's relatives included granduncle George Parkman, first cousin (once removed) Francis Parkman, uncle Alexander Emanuel Agassiz, cousin Rodolphe L. Agassiz, cousin Josephine Shaw Lowell, and nephew Louis Agassiz Shaw Jr.

== Personal life ==
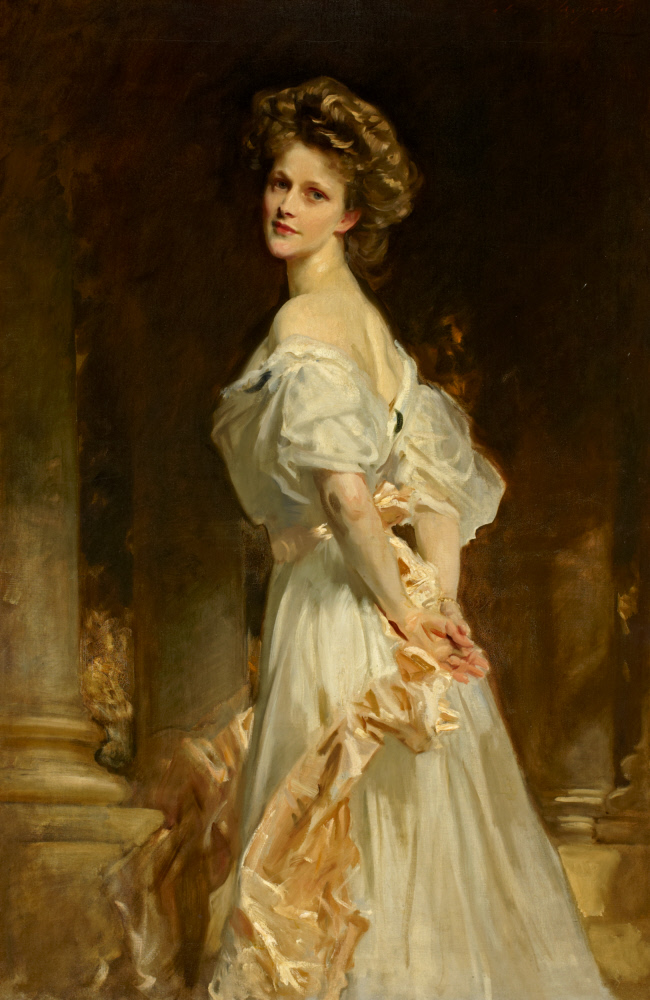
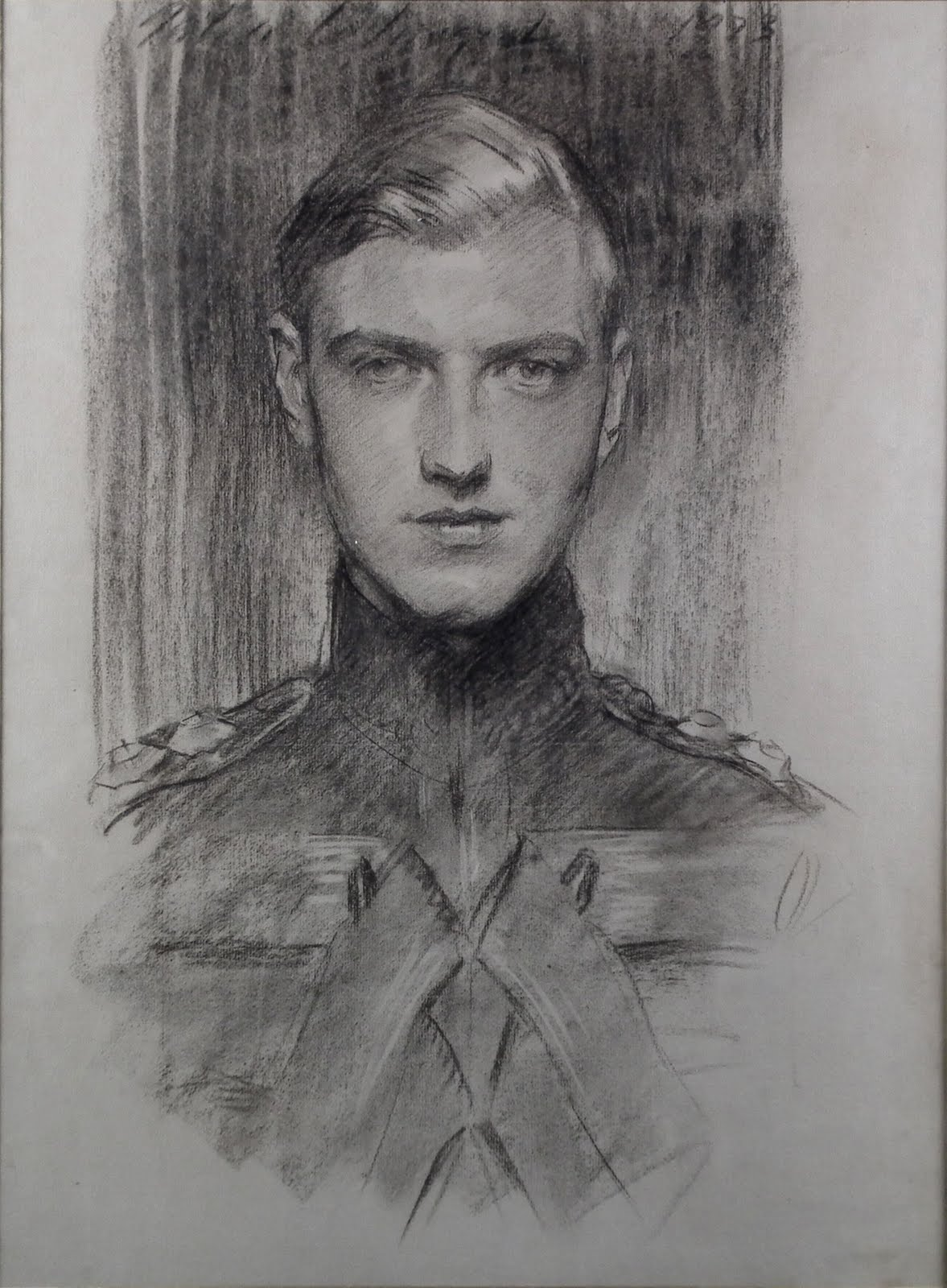
Nancy Witcher Langhorne (left), first wife of RGS II, and their son Robert Gould Shaw III (right)

On October 27, 1897, RGS II married Nancy Witcher Langhorne (1879–1964) in New York City. She was the 18-year-old daughter of railroad millionaire Chiswell Dabney Langhorne and Nancy Witcher Keene. They had one son:

- Robert Gould Shaw III (1898–1970). Died unmarried and without children.

The marriage was unhappy for both and Shaw's friends accused her of being puritanical and rigid, while Nancy's friends contended that he was an alcoholic and a womanizer. Nancy left Shaw numerous times during their brief marriage, the first time during their honeymoon. In 1903, Nancy's mother died and she divorced him, returning to Mirador, her childhood home. After his ex-wife and son moved to England, Shaw had a limited role in his son Bobby's life.

In 1905, while a passenger on a trans-Atlantic ship to England, the recently divorced Nancy met Waldorf Astor, eldest son of William Waldorf Astor and Mary Dahlgren Paul of the Astor family. The couple were married in May 1906, settling in Cliveden, a present from his father and the Astor family estate in Taplow, Buckinghamshire, England. In 1919, Nancy ran for Parliament and won, becoming the first woman to sit as a Member of Parliament in the House of Commons.

=== Second marriage ===
Shaw was married to Mary Hannington (1874–1937) and they had four sons:

- Gould Agassiz Shaw (1904-1955) Married three times. First to Hilda Shaw (née Burt) and had two children: Penelope Gould "Penny" Shaw (1925-)and Yolande Agassiz Shaw (1931-~1960). They divorced and remarried to divorcée and club singer Margaret Graham Vogel Shaw (née Townsend) and had one child: Alexander Agassiz Shaw (1951-). She died in 1951 of a throat virus at 29. Married thirdly and lastly to Brazilian Rita Shaw (née Garcia) and moved to Brazil. Died of cardiac arrest in Recife, Brazil.
- Alexander Agassiz Shaw (1905-1967) Married first to Helen Shaw (née Ellsworth) and had one child: Robert Gould Shaw IV (1928-2021). They quickly divorced that same year and he later remarried to Dianne Shaw (née Duncan) who had a daughter Phyllis from a previous marriage. Died in Topsfield, Massachusetts.
- Louis Agassiz Shaw II (1906–1987) Died unmarried and without children at McLean Hospital, Belmont, Massachusetts.
- Paul Agassiz Shaw (1912–1983) World War Two Veteran, Investor, and Livestock Breeder. Married first to Elizabeth "Betty" Shaw (née Pope) and had children: Paul Agassiz Shaw Jr., Robert Gould Shaw V., and Frederic Patrick Shaw. After Elizabeth's death, he later married June Shaw (née Battles). Died in Naples, Florida.

Shaw purchased a tract of land in Oak Hill, Newton, shortly after the death of its owner, William Sumner Appleton in 1903 (father of William Sumner Appleton Jr.). He commissioned Boston architect James Lovell Little Jr. to design and construct several buildings on the property, including outbuildings of a carriage house and horse stable in 1910, a cow barn in 1912, and a primary residence (the Appleton/Shaw House) in 1912. As the Gilded Age gave way to the Progressive Era and eventually the Great Depression, the Shaw fortune collapsed.

Shaw died at the Plaza Hotel after a brief illness in 1930.

== Legacy ==
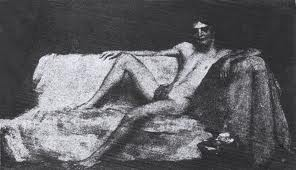
Robert Gould Shaw II as "Little Billee" from the novel Trilby, by R. G. Harper Pennington

The vacant and decaying Shaw estate in Newton was sold in 1939 to Dr. William Fitts Carlson. Carlson used the property as the new campus for Mount Ida Junior College. Adjoining tracts of land were converted into the Wells Avenue office park in the 1970s, and the Charles River Footpath (since renamed the Helen Heyn Riverway) in the 1990s.

=== In popular culture ===
Artist R. G. Harper Pennington in one of his paintings depicted a nude RGS II as the character "Little Billee" from the bohemian novel Trilby (1894) by George du Maurier. This painting hung in the bedroom of Henry Symes Lehr, the homosexual husband of Elizabeth Wharton Drexel.

In a 1982 episode of Masterpiece Theatre that chronicled the life of Nancy Astor, Pierce Brosnan portrayed RGS II as a profligate and promiscuous gambler. In this version, Nancy Langhorne Astor continued to love RGS II after her marriage to Waldorf Astor, but this has not been documented. For this performance, Brosnan was nominated for a Best Supporting Actor in 1985.
