= Nancy Astor, Viscountess Astor =

British politician (1879–1964)

The Right Honourable The Viscountess Astor CH
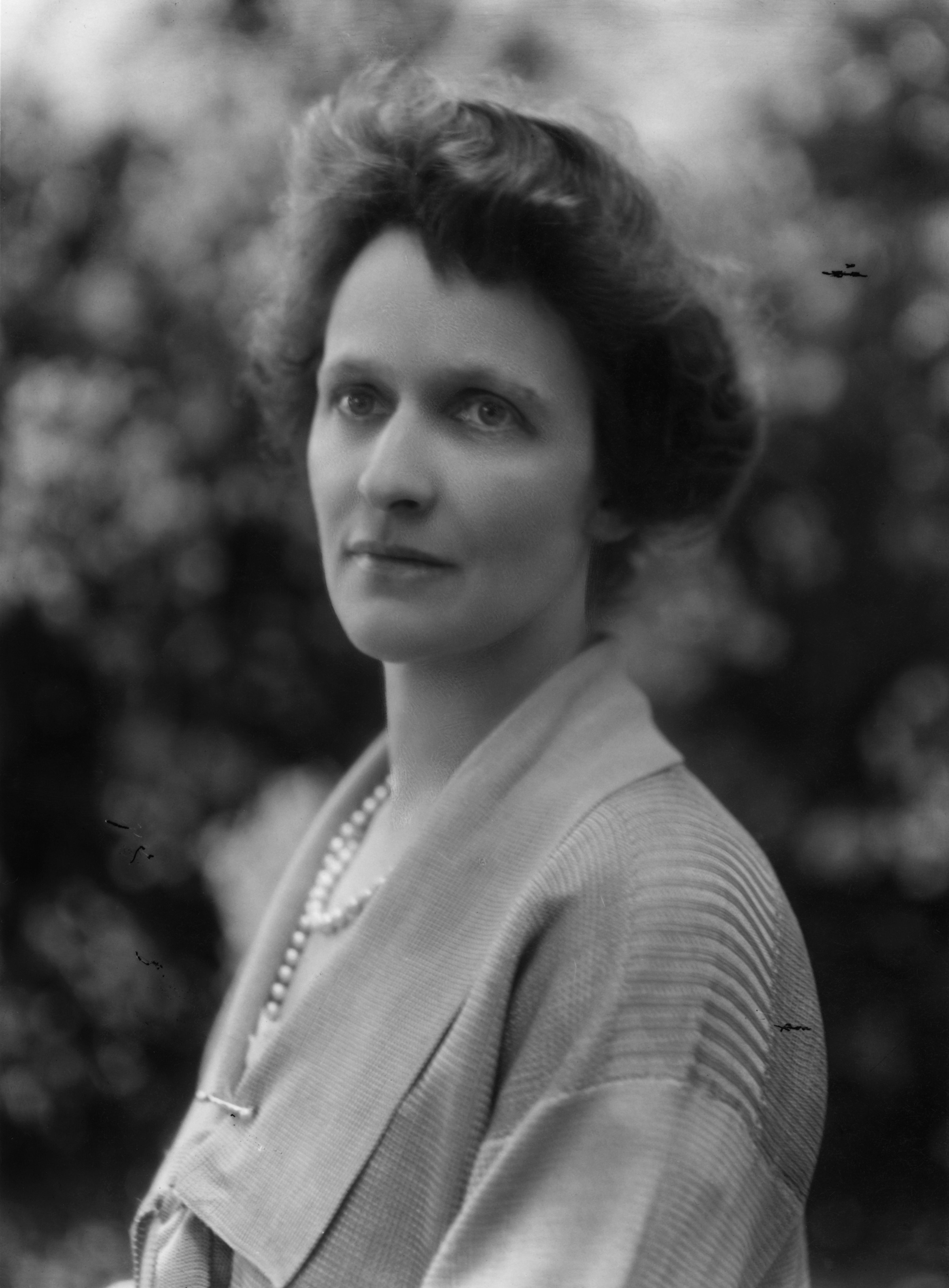
- Astor in 1923

Member of Parliament for Plymouth Sutton
- In office 28 November 1919 – 15 June 1945
- Preceded by: Waldorf Astor
- Succeeded by: Lucy Middleton

Personal details
- Born: Nancy Witcher Langhorne; 19 May 1879 Danville, Virginia, US
- Died: 2 May 1964 (aged 84) Grimsthorpe, Lincolnshire, England
- Party: Conservative
- Spouses: Robert Gould Shaw II (m. 1897; div. 1903) Waldorf Astor (m. 1906; died 1952)
- Children: Robert Gould Shaw III; William Waldorf Astor II; Nancy Phyllis Louise Astor; Francis David Langhorne Astor; Michael Langhorne Astor; John Jacob Astor VII
- Parents: Chiswell Dabney Langhorne; Nancy Witcher Keene
- Relatives: Astor family
- Occupation: Politician
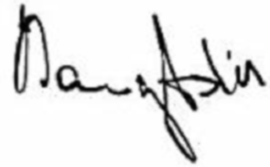
- Signature

Nancy Witcher Langhorne Astor, Viscountess Astor (19 May 1879 – 2 May 1964) was an American-born British politician who was the first woman seated as a Member of Parliament (MP), serving from 1919 to 1945. (Note: Constance Markievicz, a member of Sinn Féin, was the first woman elected to Parliament in 1918 but refused to take her seat in line with party policy. She was also detained in Holloway Prison at the time. Instead, Markievicz joined the First Dáil of the revolutionary Irish Republic.) Astor was born in Danville, Virginia, and raised in Greenwood, Virginia. Her first marriage, to socialite Robert Gould Shaw II, was unhappy and ended in divorce. She then moved to England and married American-born Englishman Waldorf Astor in 1906.

After her second husband succeeded to his father's peerage and entered the House of Lords, she entered politics as a member of the Unionist Party (now the Conservative Party) and, at the by-election caused by his elevation, won his former seat of Plymouth Sutton in 1919, becoming the first woman to sit as an MP in the House of Commons. During her time in Parliament, Astor was an advocate for temperance, welfare, education reform and women's rights. She was also an ardent anti-Catholic and anti-communist, and received criticism for her antisemitism and sympathetic view of Nazism.

Astor served in Parliament until 1945 when she was persuaded to step down, as her outspokenness had made her a political liability in the final years of the Second World War. She retired from politics and largely withdrew from public life following the death of her husband. Astor died in 1964 at Grimsthorpe Castle in Lincolnshire and was interred at her family estate at Cliveden.

== Early life ==
Nancy Witcher Langhorne was born at the Langhorne House in Danville, Virginia. She was the eighth of eleven children born to the American railroad businessman Chiswell Langhorne and Nancy Witcher Keene. Following the abolition of slavery in the US in 1865, Chiswell struggled to make his operations profitable, and due to the destruction caused by the American Civil War, the family lived in near-poverty for several years before Nancy was born. After her birth, her father gained a job as a tobacco auctioneer in Danville, the centre of bright leaf tobacco and a major marketing and processing centre.

In 1874, he won a construction contract with the Chesapeake and Ohio Railroad, using former contacts from his service in the Civil War. By 1892, when Nancy was thirteen years old, her father had re-established his wealth and built a sizeable home. Chiswell Langhorne later moved his family to an estate, known as Mirador, in Albemarle County, Virginia.

Nancy Langhorne had four sisters and three brothers who survived childhood. All of the sisters were known for their "good looks". Nancy and her sister Irene both attended St. Catherine's Episcopal School in Richmond, followed by a finishing school in New York City. There Nancy met her first husband, the socialite Robert Gould Shaw II, a first cousin of Colonel Robert Gould Shaw, who commanded the 54th Massachusetts Regiment, the first unit in the Union Army to be composed of African Americans. They married in New York City on 27 October 1897, when she was 18.

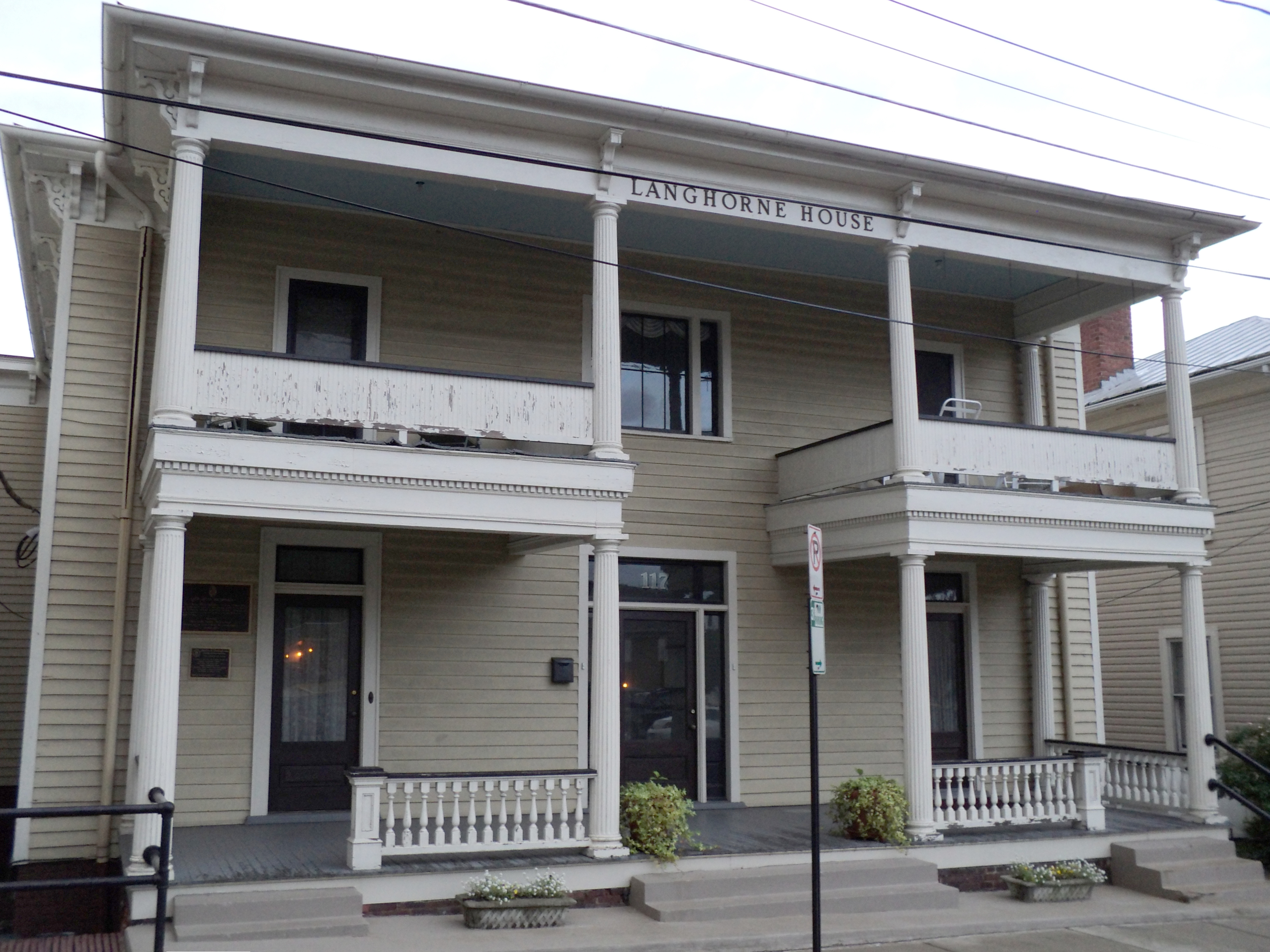
Nancy's childhood home, the Langhorne House in Danville, Virginia.

The marriage was unhappy. Shaw's friends said Nancy became puritanical and rigid after marriage. Her friends said that Shaw was an abusive alcoholic. During their four-year marriage, they had one son, Robert Gould Shaw III (Bobbie). Nancy left Shaw numerous times during their marriage, the first during their honeymoon. In 1903, Nancy's mother died; Nancy gained a divorce and moved back to Mirador to try to run her father's household but was unsuccessful.

In 1904, Nancy took a tour of England, taking with her her son Bobbie, of whom she had gained custody. She fell in love with the country. Since she had been so happy there, her father suggested she move to England. Seeing that she was reluctant, Nancy's father said it was also her mother's wish, and he suggested she take her younger sister Phyllis with her. Nancy and Phyllis moved together to England in 1905. Their older sister Irene had married the artist Charles Dana Gibson and became a model for his Gibson Girls.

== England ==
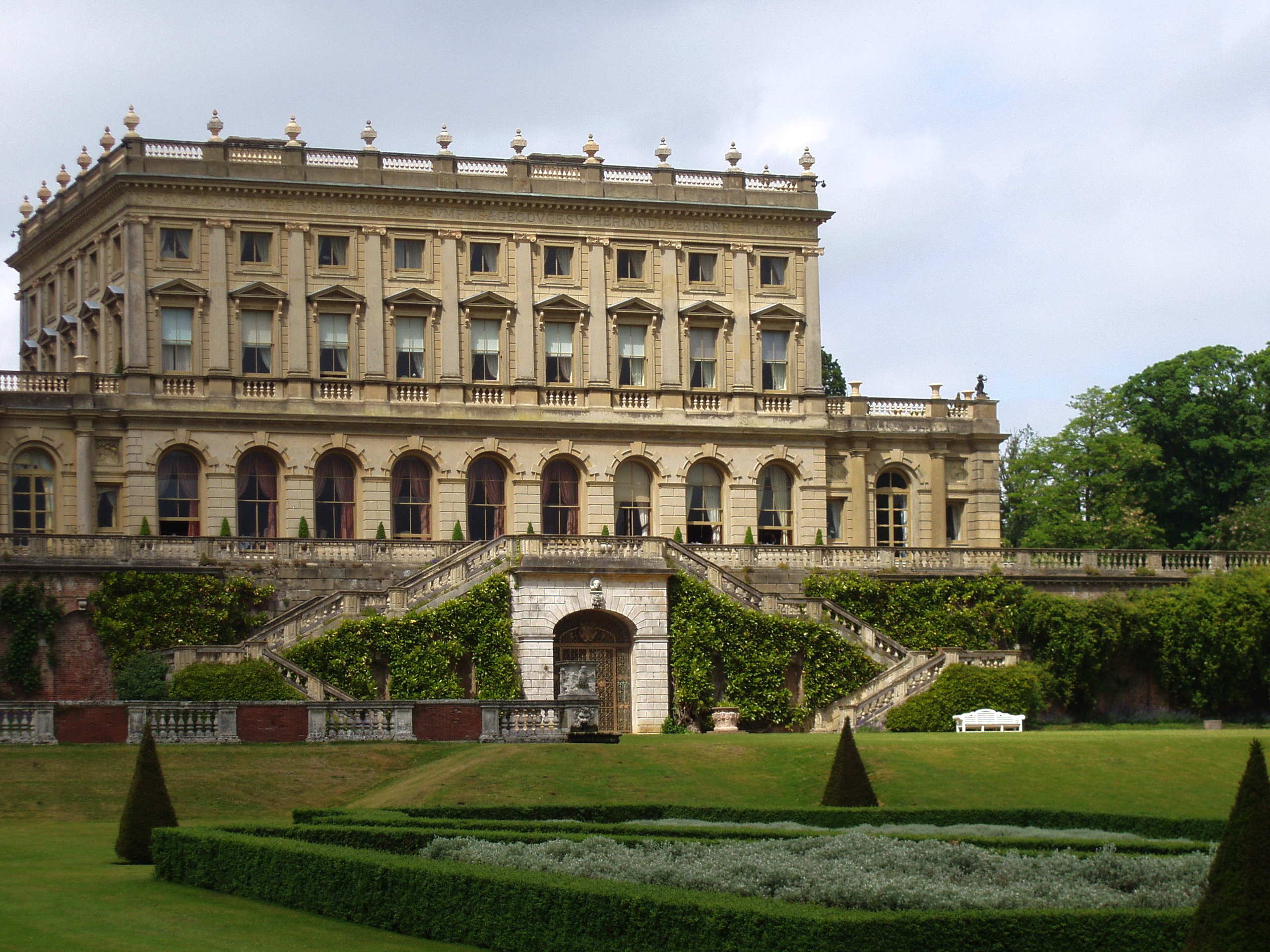
A contemporary view of Cliveden, Nancy Astor's country house

Nancy Shaw was already known in English society as an interesting and witty American at a time when numerous wealthy young American women had married into the aristocracy. Her tendency to be saucy in conversation but religiously devout and almost prudish in behaviour confused many of the English men but pleased some of the older socialites. Nancy also began to show her skill at winning over critics. She was once asked by an English woman, "Have you come to get our husbands?" Her unexpected response, "If you knew the trouble I had getting rid of mine...", charmed her listeners and displayed the wit for which she became known.

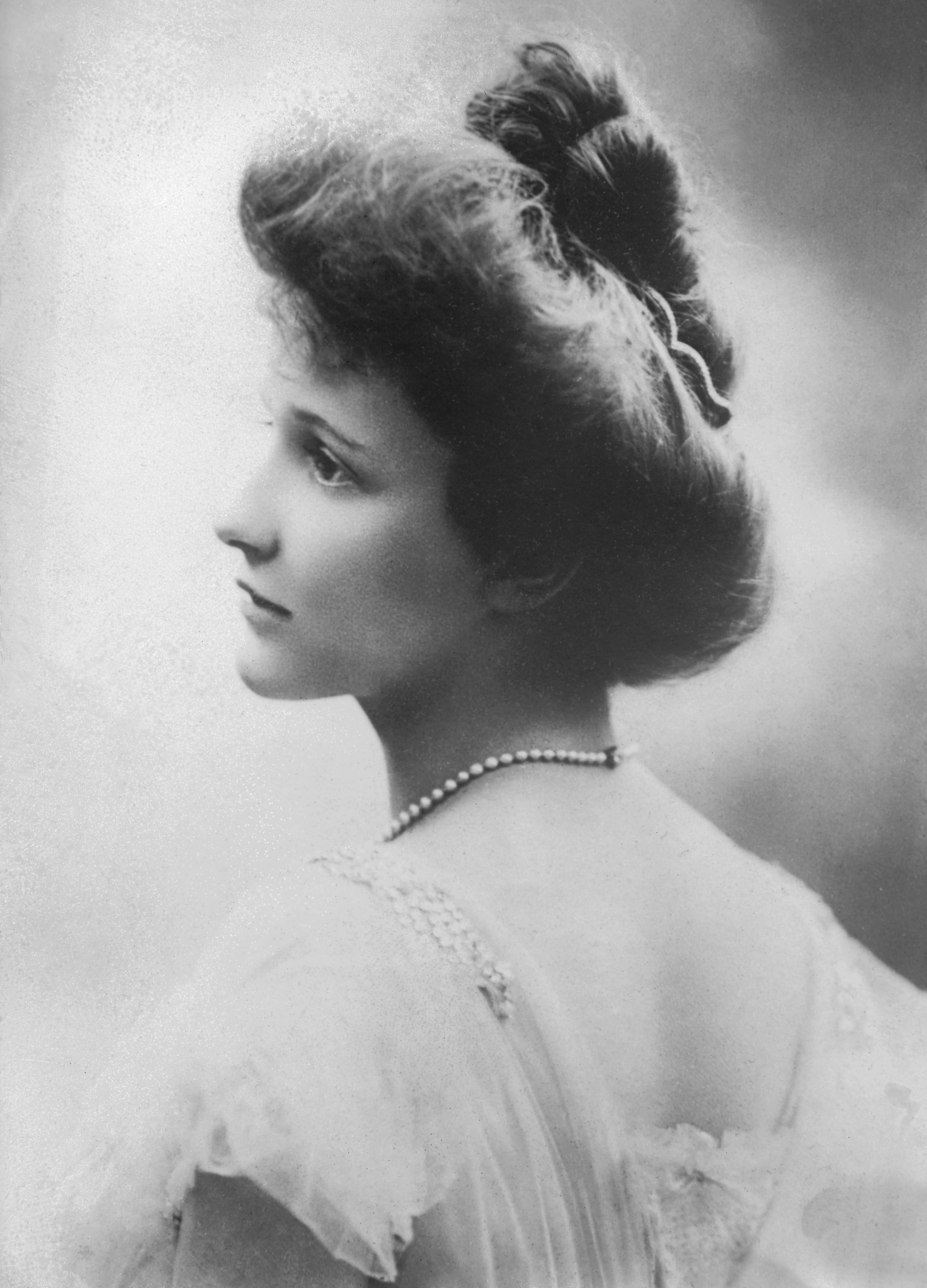
Nancy photographed around the time of her engagement to Waldorf Astor in 1906.

She married an Englishman, albeit one born in the United States, Waldorf Astor. When he was twelve, his father William Waldorf Astor had moved the family to England and raised his children in the English aristocratic style. The couple were well matched, as both were American expatriates with similar temperaments. They were of the same age and even born on the same day, 19 May 1879. Astor shared some of Nancy's moral attitudes and had a heart condition that may have contributed to his restraint. After the marriage, the Astors moved into Cliveden, a lavish estate in Buckinghamshire on the River Thames; it was a wedding gift from Astor's father. Nancy Astor developed as a prominent hostess for the social elite. (Note: Her social efforts were not always successful. Harold Nicolson recorded an entry in his diary for 29 November 1930: "Down to Cliveden. A desultory drivel. After dinner, in order to enliven the party, Lady Astor dons a Victorian hat and a pair of false teeth. It does not enliven the party".)

The Astors also bought a substantial London house, No. 4 St. James's Square, now the premises of the Naval & Military Club. A blue plaque unveiled in 1987 commemorates Astor at St. James's Square. Through her many social connections, Lady Astor became involved in a political circle called Milner's Kindergarten. Considered liberal in their age, the group advocated unity and equality among English-speaking people and a continuance or expansion of the British Empire.

== First campaign for Parliament ==
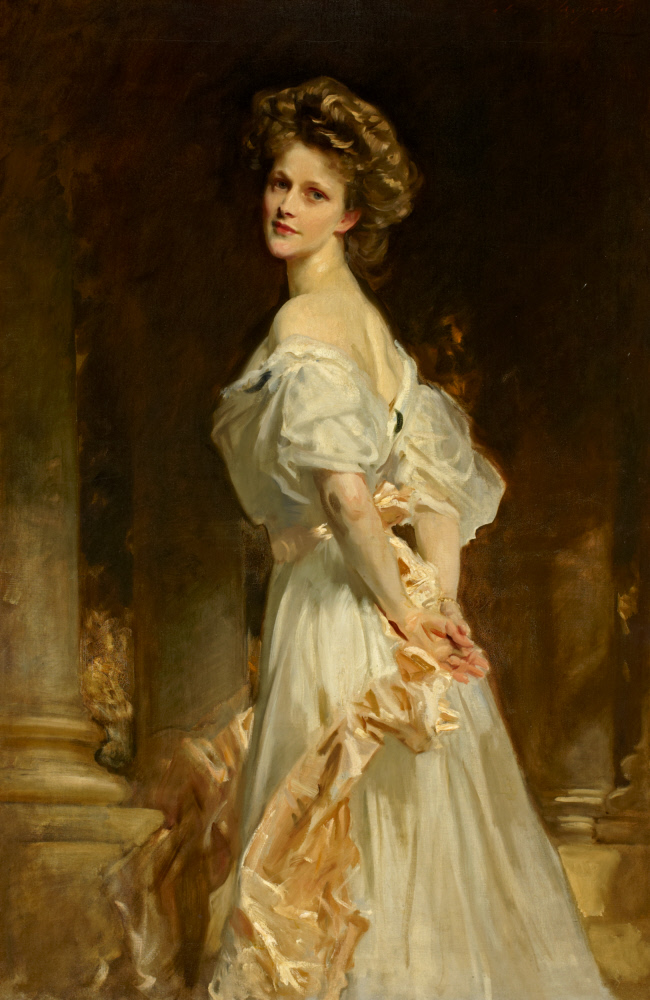
1909 portrait of Astor by John Singer Sargent

Several elements of Viscountess Astor's life influenced her first campaign, but she became a candidate after her husband succeeded to the peerage and House of Lords in 1919. He had enjoyed a promising political career for several years before World War I in the House of Commons; after his father's death, he succeeded to his father's peerage as the 2nd Viscount Astor. He automatically became a member of the House of Lords and consequently had to forfeit his seat of Plymouth Sutton in the House of Commons. With this change, Lady Astor decided to contest the by-election for the vacant Parliamentary seat.

Astor had not been connected with the women's suffrage movement in the British Isles. However, she was met as she arrived at London Paddington railway station on the day after her election by a crowd of suffragettes, including unnamed women who had been imprisoned and on hunger strike. One said, "This is the beginning of our era. I am glad to have suffered for this."

Viscountess Astor was not the first woman elected to the Westminster Parliament. That was achieved by Constance Markievicz, who was the first woman MP elected to Westminster in 1918, but Lady Astor is sometimes erroneously referred to as the first woman MP, or the first woman elected to the UK Parliament, rather than the first woman MP to take her seat in Parliament. Countess Markievicz had been in Holloway prison for Sinn Féin activities during her election; as she was an Irish Republican, she did not take her seat. Markievicz said Lady Astor was "of the upper classes, out of touch".

Astor was hampered in the popular campaign for her published and at times vocal teetotalism and her ignorance of current political issues. Astor appealed to voters on the basis of her earlier work with the Canadian soldiers, allies of the British, charitable work during the war, her financial resources for the campaign and her ability to improvise. Her audiences appreciated her wit and ability to turn the tables on hecklers. Once a man asked her what the Astors had done for him and she responded with, "Why, Charlie, you know," (Note: a mildly sexual innuendo) and later had a picture taken with him. This informal style baffled yet amused the British public. She rallied the supporters of the current government, moderated her Prohibition views, and used women's meetings to gain the support of female voters. The by-election was held on 28 November 1919, and she took up her seat in the House on 1 December as a Unionist (also known as "Tory") Member of Parliament.

Astor was the first woman to be elected through what has been termed the "halo effect" of women taking over their husbands' parliamentary seats, a process which accounted for the election of ten woman MPs (nearly a third of the women elected to parliament) between the two world wars.

== Early years in Parliament ==
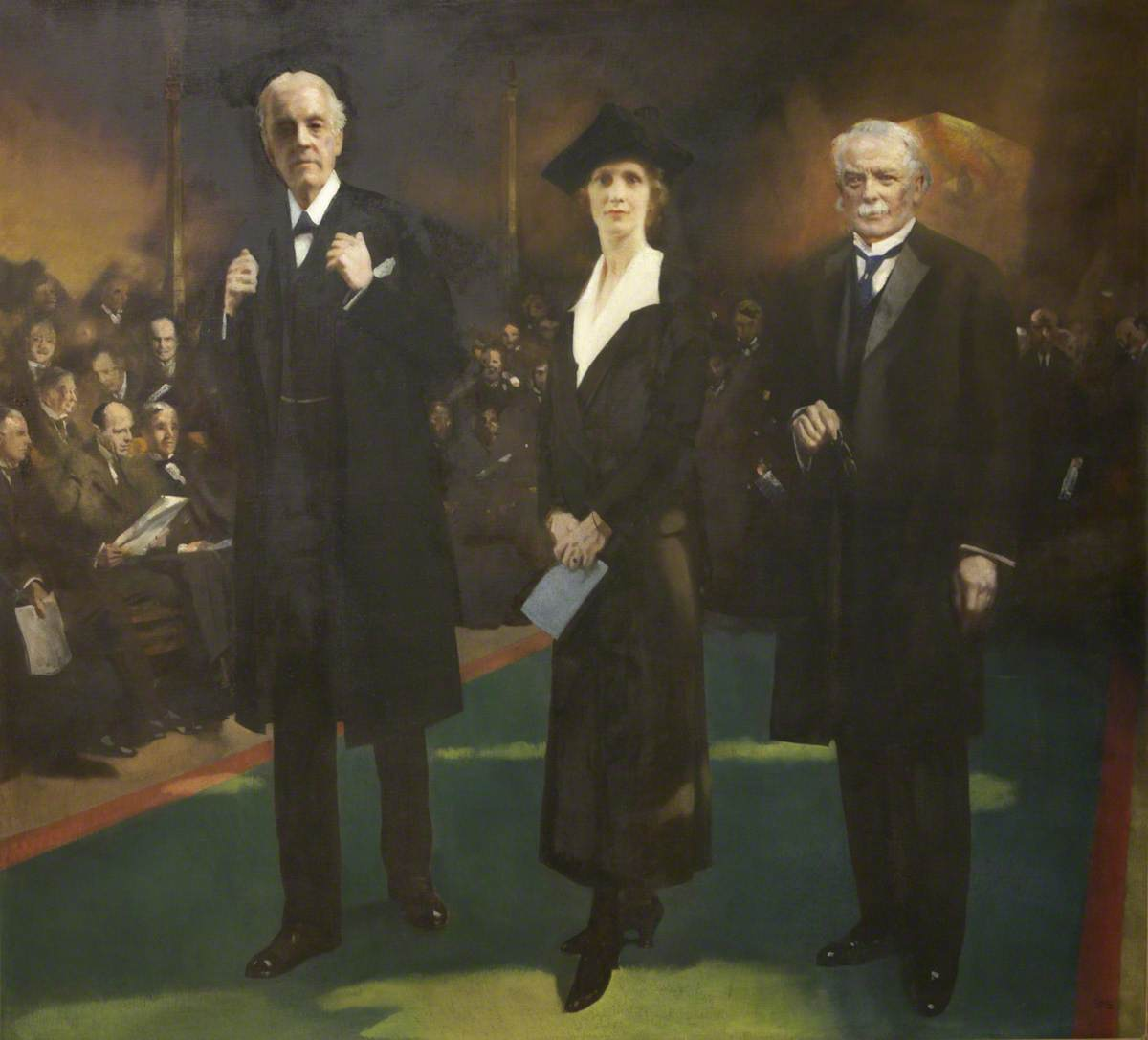
Charles Sims, Introduction of Lady Astor as the First Woman MP, c. 1919, The Box, Plymouth

Astor's Parliamentary career was the most public phase of her life. She gained attention as a woman and as someone who did not follow the rules, often attributed to her American upbringing. On her first day in the House of Commons, she was called to order for chatting with a fellow House member, not realising that she was the person who was causing the commotion. She learned to dress more sedately and avoided the bars and smoking rooms frequented by the men.

Early in her first term, MP Horatio Bottomley wanted to dominate the "soldier's friend" issue and, believing her to be an obstacle, sought to ruin her political career. He capitalised on her opposition to divorce reform and her efforts to maintain wartime alcohol restrictions. Bottomley portrayed her as a hypocrite, as she was divorced. He said that the reform bill that she opposed would allow women to have the same kind of divorce she had in America. Bottomley was later imprisoned for fraud, which Astor used to her advantage in other campaigns.

Astor made friends among women MPs, including members of the other parties. Margaret Wintringham was elected after Astor had been in office for two years. Astor befriended Ellen Wilkinson, a member of the Labour Party (and a former Communist). Astor later proposed creating a "Women's Party", but the female Labour MPs opposed that, as their party was then in office and had promised them positions. Over time, political differences separated the women MPs; by 1931 Astor became hostile to female Labour members such as Susan Lawrence.

Nancy Astor's accomplishments in the House of Commons were relatively minor. Despite defending her seat in five consecutive elections throughout the 1920s, she never held a position with much influence or any post of ministerial rank although her time in Commons saw four Conservative Prime Ministers in office. Katharine, Duchess of Atholl (elected to Parliament in 1923, four years after Lady Astor) rose to higher levels in the Conservative Party before Astor. Astor felt if she had more position in the party, she would be less free to criticise her party's government.

During this period, Nancy Astor continued to be active outside government by supporting the development and expansion of nursery schools for children's education. She was introduced to the issue by socialist Margaret McMillan, who believed that her late sister helped guide her in life. Lady Astor was initially sceptical of that aspect, but the two women later became close. Astor used her wealth to aid their social efforts.

Although active in charitable efforts, Astor became noted for a streak of cruelty. On hearing of the death of a political enemy, she expressed her pleasure. When people complained, she did not apologise but said, "I'm a Virginian; we shoot to kill." Angus McDonnell, a Virginia friend, angered her by marrying without consulting her on his choice. She later told him, regarding his maiden speech, that he "really must do better than that." During the course of her adult life, Astor alienated many with her sharp words as well.

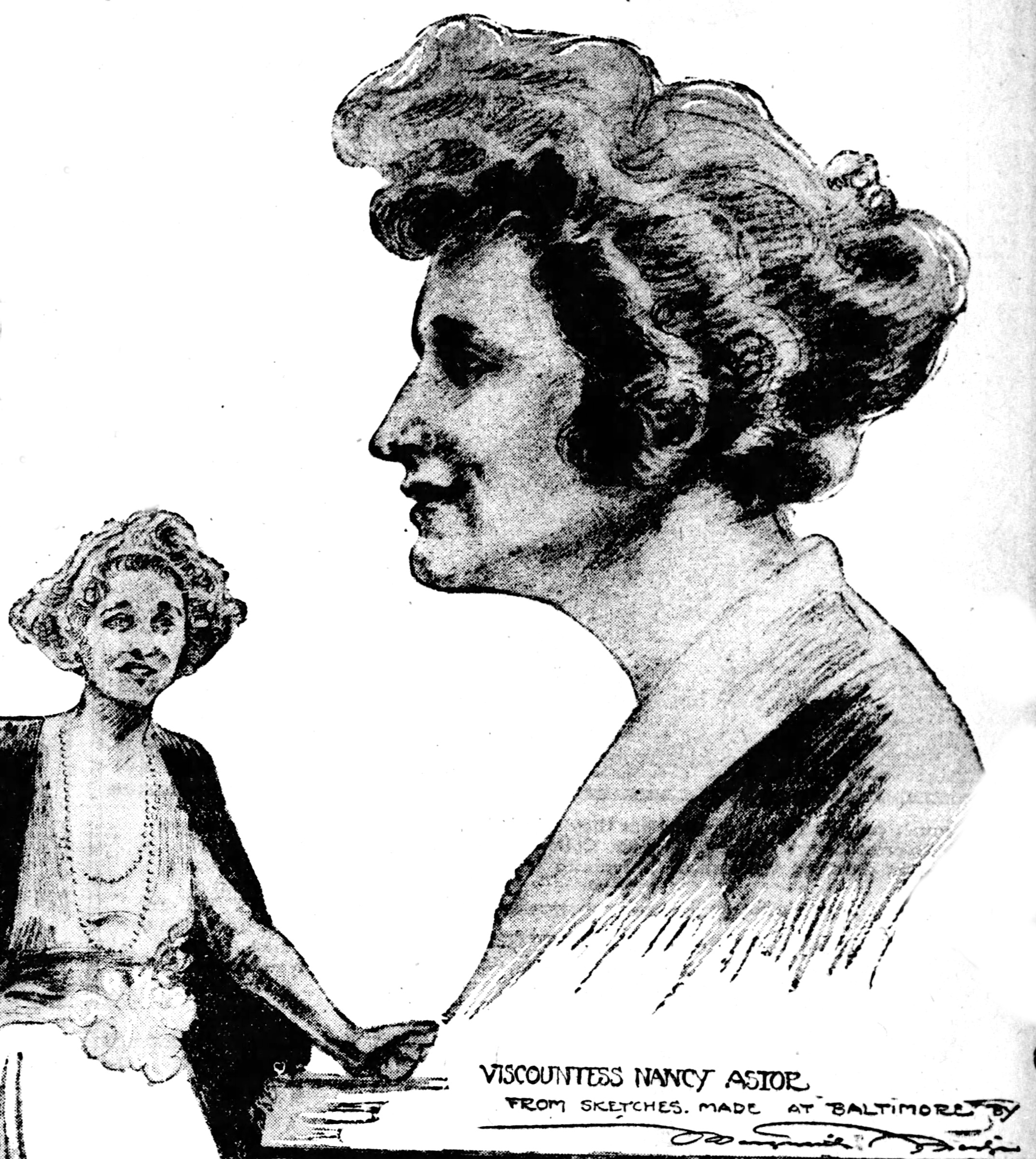
Astor as sketched in 1922 by Marguerite Martyn of the St. Louis Post-Dispatch

During the 1920s, Astor made several effective speeches in Parliament, and gained support for her Intoxicating Liquor (Sale to Persons under 18) Bill (nicknamed "Lady Astor's Bill"), raising the legal age for consuming alcohol in a public house from 14 to 18. Her wealth and persona brought attention to women who were serving in government. She worked to recruit women into the civil service, the police force, education reform, and the House of Lords. She was well-liked in her constituency, as well as the United States during the 1920s, but her success is generally believed to have declined in the following decades.

In May 1922, Astor was guest of honour at a Pan-American conference held by the League of Women Voters in Baltimore, Maryland.

Astor became the first President of the newly-formed Electrical Association For Women in 1924.

She chaired the first ever International Conference of Women In Science, Industry and Commerce, a three-day event held London in July 1925, organised by Caroline Haslett for the Women's Engineering Society in co-operation with other leading women's groups. Astor hosted a large gathering at her home in St James's to enable networking amongst the international delegates, and spoke strongly of her support of and the need for women to work in the fields of science, engineering and technology.

She was concerned about the treatment of juvenile victims of crime: "The work of new MPs, such as Nancy Astor, led to a Departmental Committee on Sexual Offences Against Young People, which reported in 1925."

== 1930s ==
The 1930s were a decade of personal and professional difficulty for Lady Astor. In 1929, she won a narrow victory over the Labour candidate. In 1931, Bobby Shaw, her son from her first marriage, was arrested for homosexual offences. As her son had previously shown tendencies towards alcoholism and instability, Astor's friend Philip Kerr, 11th Marquess of Lothian suggested the arrest might act as a catalyst for him to change his behaviour, but he was incorrect.

Astor made a disastrous speech stating that alcohol use was the reason for England's national cricket team being defeated by the Australian national cricket team. Both the English and Australian teams objected to that statement. Astor remained oblivious to her growing unpopularity almost to the end of her career.

Astor's friendship with George Bernard Shaw helped her through some of her problems although his own nonconformity caused friction between them. They held opposing political views and had very different temperaments. However, his own tendency to make controversial statements or put her into awkward situations proved to be a drawback for her political career.

After Bobby Shaw was arrested, Gertrude Ely, a Pennsylvania Railroad heiress from Bryn Mawr, Pennsylvania offered to provide a guided tour to Moscow for Lady Astor and Bobby. Because of public comments by her and her son during this period, her political career suffered. Her son made many flattering statements about the Soviet Union, and Astor often disparaged it because she did not approve of Communism. In a meeting, she asked Joseph Stalin directly why he had slaughtered so many Russians, but many of her criticisms were translated as less challenging statements. Some of her conservative supporters feared she had "gone soft" on Communism; her question to Stalin may have been translated correctly only because he insisted on being told what she had said. The Conservatives felt that her son's praise of the Soviet Union served as a coup for its propaganda and so they were unhappy with her tour.

Astor became increasingly harsh in her antisemitic and anticommunist sentiments during this period. After the passage of the Munich Agreement, she said that if the Czech refugees fleeing Nazi oppression were communists, they should seek asylum with the Soviets, instead of the British. While supporters of appeasement felt that to be out of line, Lothian encouraged her comments.

== World War II ==
When World War II began, Astor admitted that she had made mistakes, and voted against Chamberlain, but left-wing hostility to her politics remained. In a 1939 speech, the Labour MP Stafford Cripps called her "The Member for Berlin".

Astor's fear of Catholics increased and she made a speech saying that a Catholic conspiracy was subverting the Foreign Office. Based on her opposition to Communists, she insulted Stalin's role (from 1941) as one of the Allied Powers during the war. Her speeches became rambling and incomprehensible; an opponent said that debating her had become "like playing squash with a dish of scrambled eggs". On one occasion she accosted a young American soldier outside the Houses of Parliament. "Would you like to go in?" she asked. The GI replied: "You are the sort of woman my mother told me to avoid".

The period from 1937 to the end of the war was personally difficult for Astor: in January of that year she lost her sister Phyllis, followed by her only surviving brother in 1938. In 1940, Lothian died. He had been her closest Christian Scientist friend even after her husband converted. George Bernard Shaw's wife died three years later. During the war, Astor's husband had a heart attack. After this, their marriage grew cold, likely due to her subsequent discomfort with his health problems. She ran a hospital for Canadian soldiers as she had during the First World War, but openly expressed a preference for the earlier soldiers.

It was generally believed that Lady Astor, during a World War II speech, referred to the men of the Eighth Army who were fighting in the Italian campaign as the "D-Day Dodgers", suggesting they were avoiding the "real war" in France and the future invasion. The Allied soldiers in Italy were so incensed that Major Hamish Henderson of the 51st Highland Division composed a bitingly sarcastic song to the tune of the popular German song "Lili Marleen", called "The Ballad of the D-Day Dodgers". This song has also been attributed to Lance-Sergeant Harry Pynn of the Tank Rescue Section, 19 Army Fire Brigade. However, there is no record that she actually said this, in or out of Parliament, and she denied ever saying it.

When told she was one of the people listed to be arrested, imprisoned and face possible execution in "The Black Book" under a German invasion of Britain, Lady Astor commented: "It is the complete answer to the terrible lie that the so-called 'Cliveden Set' was pro-Fascist."

== Final years ==
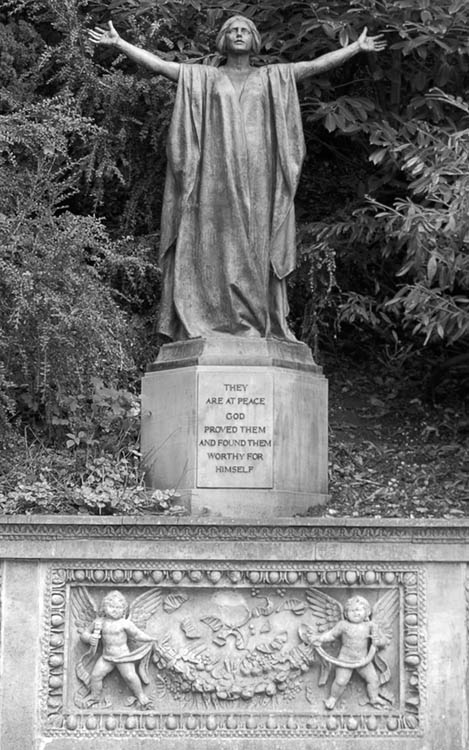
A statue at Cliveden, overlooking 42 inscribed stones dedicated to the dead of World War I. Sir Edgar Bertram Mackennal's figure represents Canada with the head reputedly modelled by Lady Astor

Lady Astor believed her party and her husband caused her retirement in 1945. As the Conservatives believed she had become a political liability in the final years of World War II, her husband said that if she stood for office again the family would not support her. She conceded but, according to contemporary reports, was both irritated and angry about her situation.

Lady Astor struggled in retirement, which put further strain on her marriage. In a speech commemorating her 25 years in parliament, she stated that her retirement was forced on her and that it should please the men of Britain. The couple began travelling separately and soon were living apart. Lord Astor also began moving towards left-wing politics in his last years, and that exacerbated their differences. However, the couple reconciled before his death on 30 September 1952.

Lady Astor's public image suffered, as her ethnic and religious views were increasingly out of touch with cultural changes in Britain. She expressed a growing paranoia regarding ethnic minorities. In one instance, she stated that the President of the United States had become too dependent on New York City. To her this city represented "Jewish and foreign" influences that she feared. During a US tour, she told a group of African-American students that they should aspire to be like the black servants she remembered from her youth. On a later trip, she told African-American church members that they should be grateful for American slavery because it had allowed them to be introduced to Christianity. In Rhodesia she proudly told the white minority government leaders that she was the daughter of a slave owner.

After 1956, Nancy Astor became increasingly isolated. In 1959, she was honoured by receiving the Freedom of City of Plymouth. By this time, she had lost all her sisters and brothers, her colleague "Red Ellen" Wilkinson died in 1947, George Bernard Shaw died in 1950, and she did not take well to widowhood. Her eldest son Bobby Shaw became increasingly combative and committed suicide after her death. Her youngest son Jakie married a prominent Catholic woman, which hurt his relationship with his mother. She and her other children became estranged. Gradually she began to accept Catholics as friends. However, she said that her final years were lonely.

Lady Astor died in 1964 at her daughter Nancy Astor's home at Grimsthorpe Castle in Lincolnshire. She was cremated and her ashes interred at the Octagon Temple at Cliveden.

== Alleged exchanges with Churchill ==
She was known for purported exchanges with Winston Churchill, though most of these are not well documented. Churchill told Lady Astor that having a woman in Parliament was like having one intrude on him in the bathroom, to which she retorted, "You're not handsome enough to have such fears." Astor is also said to have responded to a question from Churchill about what disguise he should wear to a masquerade ball by saying, "Why don't you come sober, Prime Minister?" A famous anecdote, of which there are variations, tells of Churchill's exchange with Astor when she failed to best him in an argument; she broke off with the remark "If you were my husband, I'd put poison in your tea." He retorted with "Madam, if I were your husband, I'd drink it with pleasure." On another occasion, Astor, who disapproved of alcohol, allegedly came upon an intoxicated Churchill saying, "Winston, you're drunk!" To which Churchill replied "And you are ugly. However, tomorrow I shall be sober". However, evidence indicates that this exchange actually occurred with Bessie Braddock, so that the misattribution to Nancy Astor is an urban myth.

== Views ==
=== Anti-Catholicism, antisemitism and anticommunism ===
Despite having several Catholic friends including Hilaire Belloc, Astor held strong anti-Catholic views during her lifetime. She attempted to discourage the hiring of Jews and Catholics to senior positions at The Observer, a newspaper owned by her husband. With Milner's Kindergarten, Astor began her association with Lothian. The friendship became important in her religious life; they met shortly after Lothian had suffered a spiritual crisis regarding his once devout belief in Catholicism. They were attracted to Christian Science, to which they both eventually converted. After converting, she began to proselytise for that faith and played a role in Lothian's conversion to it. She also tried to convert Belloc's daughters to Christian Science, which led to a rift between them.

Astor also held strong antisemitic and anticommunist views during her lifetime. She was reportedly a supporter of the Nazis as a solution to what she saw as the "world problems" of Jews and communists. In 1938, Astor met Joseph P. Kennedy Sr., a well-known antisemite. She asked him not to take offence at her anti-Catholic views and wrote, "I'm glad you are smart enough not to take my [views] personally". She highlighted the fact that she had a number of Catholic friends. Astor and Kennedy's correspondence is reportedly filled with antisemitic language, and Edward J. Renehan Jr. wrote:

As fiercely anti-Communist as they were anti-Semitic, Kennedy and Astor looked upon Adolf Hitler as a welcome solution to both of these "world problems" (Nancy's phrase). ... Kennedy replied that he expected the "Jew media" in the United States to become a problem, that "Jewish pundits in New York and Los Angeles" were already making noises contrived to "set a match to the fuse of the world".

Astor commented to Kennedy that Hitler would have to do worse than "give a rough time... to the killers of Christ" for Britain and America to risk "Armageddon to save them. The wheel of history swings round as the Lord would have it. Who are we to stand in the way of the future?" Astor made various other documented anti-Semitic comments, such as her complaint that the Observer newspaper, which was owned at the time by her husband, was "full of homosexuals and Jews", and her tense antisemitic exchange with MP Alan Graham in 1938, as described by Harold Nicolson:

In the corridor a friend of mine named Alan Graham came up to Nancy and said, 'I do not think you behaved very well' [in a meeting of the Foreign Affairs Select Committee]. She turned upon him and said, 'Only a Jew like you would dare to be rude to me.' He replied, 'I should like very much to smack you in your face.' I think she is a little mad.

David Feldman of the Pears Institute for the Study of Antisemitism has also related that whilst attending a dinner at the Savoy Hotel in 1934, Astor asked the League of Nations' High Commissioner for Refugees whether he believed "that there must be something in the Jews themselves that had brought them persecution throughout the ages". Dr Feldman acknowledged, however, that it was "not an unusual view" and explained it "was a conventional idea in the UK at the time". Some years later, during a visit to New York in 1947, she apparently "clashed" with reporters, renouncing her antisemitism, telling one that she was "not anti-Jewish but gangsterism isn't going to solve the Palestine problem".

Astor was also deeply involved in the so-called Cliveden set, a group of aristocrats that was described by one journalist as having subscribed to their own form of fascism. In 1936 the group welcomed the German foreign minister, Joachim von Ribbentrop, who subsequently communicated to Hitler that the Cliveden set was one of the organisations "that want a fresh understanding with Germany and who hold that it would not basically be impossible to achieve". The Sunday newspaper Reynolds News also reported that "Cliveden has been the centre of friendship with German influence". To that end, several of her friends and associates, especially Lothian, were involved in the policy of appeasement towards Nazi Germany. Astor, however, was worried that the group might be viewed as a pro-German conspiracy, and her husband wrote in a letter to The Times: "To link our weekends with any particular clique is as absurd as is the allegation that those of us who desire to establish better relations with Germany or Italy are pro-Nazis or pro-Fascists".

At the request of her friend Felix Frankfurter, a future US Supreme Court justice who was Jewish, Astor intervened with the Nazis in Vienna and secured the release of Frankfurter's Jewish uncle, Solomon. Astor occasionally met with Nazi officials in keeping with Neville Chamberlain's policies, and she was known to distrust and to dislike British Foreign Secretary (later Prime Minister) Anthony Eden. She is alleged to have told one Nazi official that she supported German rearmament because the country was "surrounded by Catholics". She also told Ribbentrop, the German ambassador, who later became the foreign minister of Germany, that Hitler looked too much like Charlie Chaplin to be taken seriously. Those statements are the only documented incidents of her direct expressions to Nazis.

== Legacy ==
In 1982 the BBC broadcast a nine-part television drama serial about her life, Nancy Astor, which starred Lisa Harrow. A bronze statue of Lady Astor was installed in Plymouth, near her former family home, in 2019 to commemorate the 100th anniversary of her election to Parliament.

Astor's antisemitism has been widely documented and has been criticised in recent years, particularly in light of former Prime Minister Theresa May's unveiling of the Plymouth statue honouring her with Prime Minister Boris Johnson in attendance, and more recently after Labour MP Rachel Reeves commemorated Astor in a series of tweets. The leader of the Labour Party, Jeremy Corbyn, while opposed to her anti-Semitism, recognised she was the first woman MP to take up her place in Parliament and so praised installation of the statue, commenting "I'm really pleased the statue is going up".

During the George Floyd protests in 2020, the word "Nazi" was spray-painted on the statue's base. It was on a list published on a website called Topple the Racists.

== Children ==
1. Robert Gould Shaw III (1898–1970)
2. William Waldorf Astor II (1907–1966)
3. Nancy Phyllis Louise Astor (1909–1975)
4. Francis David Langhorne Astor (1912–2001)
5. Michael Langhorne Astor (1916–1980)
6. John Jacob Astor VII "Jakie" (1918–2000)

== Sources ==
- Astor, Michael, Tribal Feelings (Readers Union, 1964)
- Cowling, Maurice, The Impact of Hitler: British Policies and Policy 1933–1940 (Cambridge University Press, 1975), p. 402, ISBN 0-521-20582-4
- Fort, Adrian, Nancy: The Story of Lady Astor (Jonathan Cape, 2012) ISBN 978-0-224-09016-2
- Fox, James, The Langhorne Sisters (Granta Books, 1998) ISBN 978-1-862-07071-4.
- Grigg, John, Nancy Astor: Portrait of a Pioneer (Sidgwick & Jackson, 1980) ISBN 978-0-283-98631-4
- Masters, Anthony (1981). Nancy Astor: A Biography. New York City: McGraw-Hill Education. ISBN 0-07-040784-3.
- Harrison, Rosina. Rose: My Life in Service (Littlehampton, 1975)
- Harrison, Rosina, The Lady's Maid. My Life in Service (Ebury Publishing, 2011)
- Musolf, Karen J., From Plymouth to Parliament (St. Martin's Press, 1999)
- Nicolson, Harold (1966). Nigel Nicolson (ed.). Diaries and Letters: 1930–1939. London, UK: William Collins, Sons. OCLC 874514916.
- Sykes, Christopher (1984). Nancy: The Life of Lady Astor. Chicago: Academy Chicago Publishers. ISBN 0-89733-098-6.
- Astor, Lady Nancy (1997). Martin Thornton (ed.). Nancy Astor's Canadian Correspondence, 1912–1962. Lewiston, New York: Edwin Mellen Press. ISBN 0-7734-8452-3.
- Wearing, J. P. (editor), Bernard Shaw and Nancy Astor (University of Toronto Press, 2005)

Parliament of the United Kingdom
Preceded by Waldorf Astor	Member of Parliament for Plymouth Sutton; 1919–1945	Succeeded by Lucy Middleton
