= Folly Mills Creek Fen Natural Area Preserve =

Protected area in Virginia, US

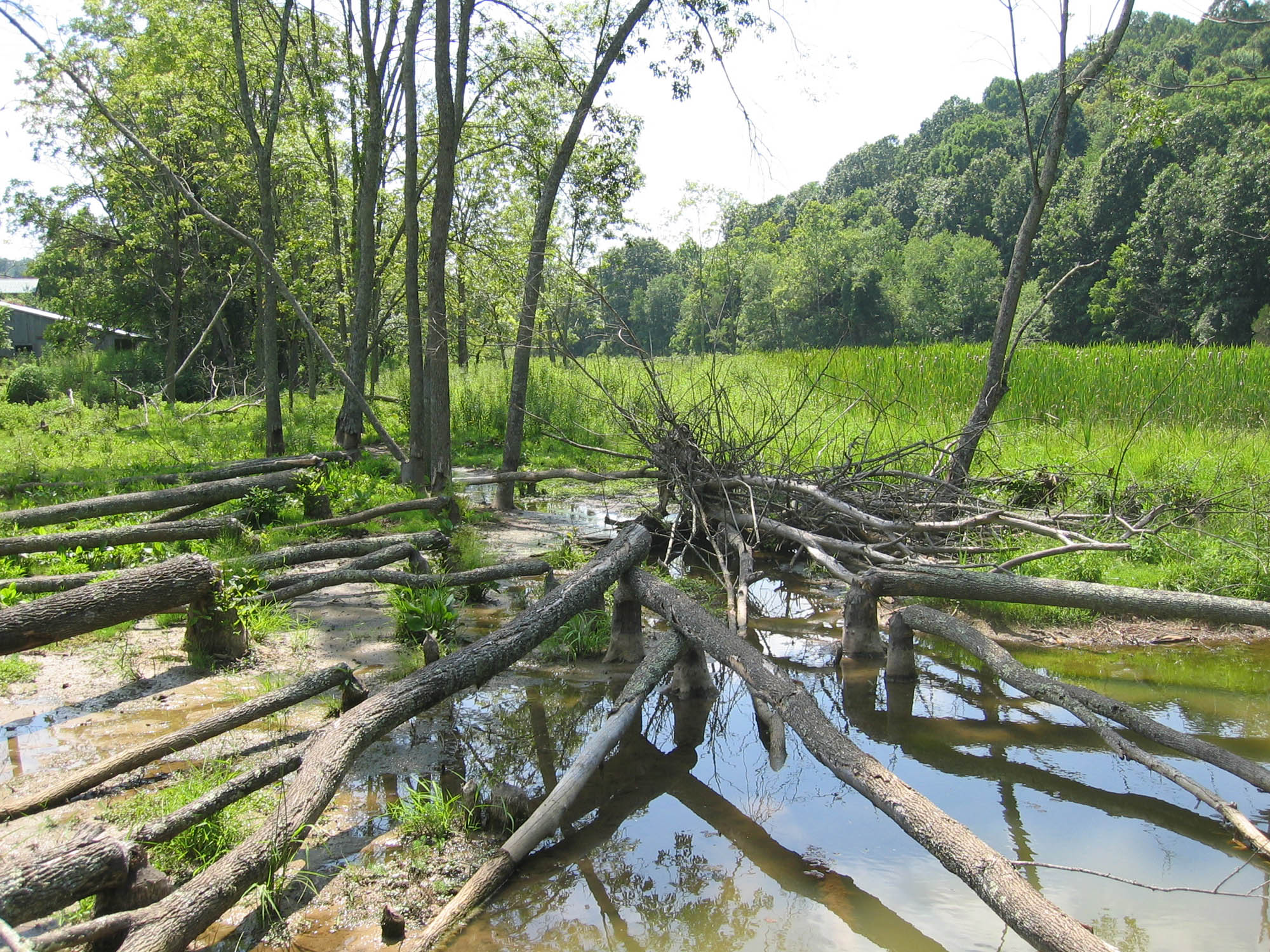
- Folly Mills Fen, 2006

- Location within Virginia Location within the United States
- Location: Augusta County, Virginia
- Coordinates: 38°05′59″N 79°08′00″W
- Area: 28 acres (11 ha)
- Owner: Private

Folly Mills Creek Fen Natural Area Preserve is a Natural Area Preserve located in Augusta County, Virginia. The preserve was dedicated in 1998, and was the first privately owned Natural Area Preserve to be dedicated in the state.

The 28-acre (11 ha) preserve contains a Shenandoah Valley fen community; the property is located in the floodplain of Folly Mills Creek, a tributary of Christians Creek. The fen is fed by artesian springs from an aquifer in the region's limestone bedrock; this fosters the development of numerous rare and unusual plants. Such wetlands were once more common in the Shenandoah Valley, but few remain. The habitat contains mainly sedges, cattails, and various shrubs. Among the rare species are bog buckbean (Menyanthes trifoliata), pussywillow (Salix discolor), queen-of-the-prairie (Filipendula rubra), shining ladies' tresses (Spiranthes lucida), prairie sedge (Carex prairea), and prairie loosestrife (Lysimachia quadriflora).

The preserve is privately owned, and public access is restricted. Visitors must make arrangements with the property's owners and a state-employed land steward prior to visiting.

== See also ==
- List of Virginia Natural Area Preserves
