= Mirador (Greenwood, Virginia) =

Historic house in Virginia, United States

- U.S. National Register of Historic Places
- Virginia Landmarks Register
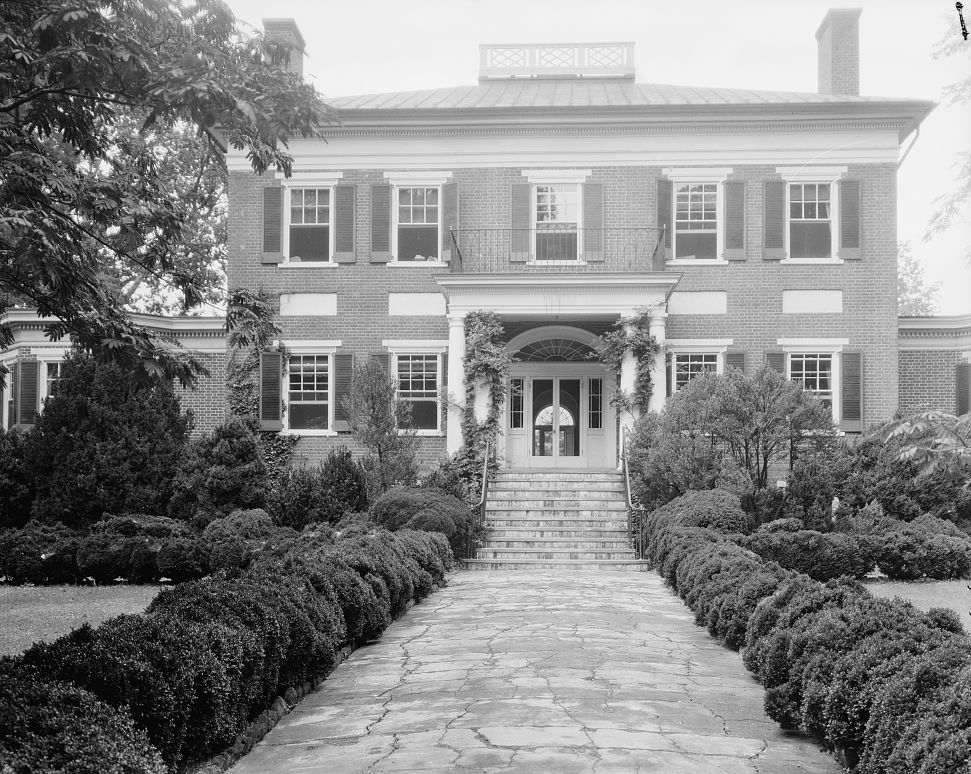
- Mirador, photograph by Frances Benjamin Johnston, 1926

- Location within Virginia Location within the United States
- Location: 7459 Mirador Farm Rd., US 250, Greenwood, Virginia
- Coordinates: 38°2′17″N 78°45′24″W
- Area: 32 acres (13 ha)
- Built: 1842, renovated 1920s
- Architect: William Adams Delano
- Architectural style: Federal, Georgian Revival
- NRHP reference No.: 83003256
- VLR No.: 002-0100

Significant dates
- Added to NRHP: April 7, 1983
- Designated VLR: September 16, 1982, June 12, 2002

Mirador is a historic home located near Greenwood, Albemarle County, Virginia, United States. It was built in 1842 for James M. Bowen (1793–1880), and is a two-story, brick structure on a raised basement in the Federal style. It has a deck-on-hip roof capped by a Chinese Chippendale railing. The front facade features a portico with paired Tuscan order columns. The house was renovated in the 1920s by noted New York architect William Adams Delano (1874–1960), who transformed the house into a Georgian Revival mansion.

Mirador was the childhood home of Nancy Langhorne Astor, who was born in Danville, Virginia. Her father Chiswell Langhorne's finances were decimated by the American Civil War, but he later made a fortune in the tobacco business and railroads and was able to purchase Mirador. Nancy Langhorne, later Lady Astor, lived at the home from 1892 to 1897, and her sister Irene, later the wife of artist Charles Dana Gibson and a model for the Gibson Girl, also spent part of her youth at the estate.

It was listed on the National Register of Historic Places in 1983.

== Grounds ==
Mirador is surrounded by extensive landscaped grounds that include a sunken lawn and a walk bordered by serpentine brick walls. Near the main house is an antebellum period brick kitchen-like dependency and an antebellum period frame smokehouse, an antebellum two-story brick and frame dwelling known as the Corner House, and a brick Colonial Revival stable dating to about 1910. Beyond the house are the farm buildings built in the 1920s including a Colonial Revival dairy barn complex arranged around a cobblestone courtyard, a brick farm manager's house, a concrete block tenant house, two lakes, and the Sam Black Tavern, a log building built ca.1769 and moved to the property from the neighboring Seven Oaks Farm.

== Outbuildings ==
=== Sam Black's Tavern ===
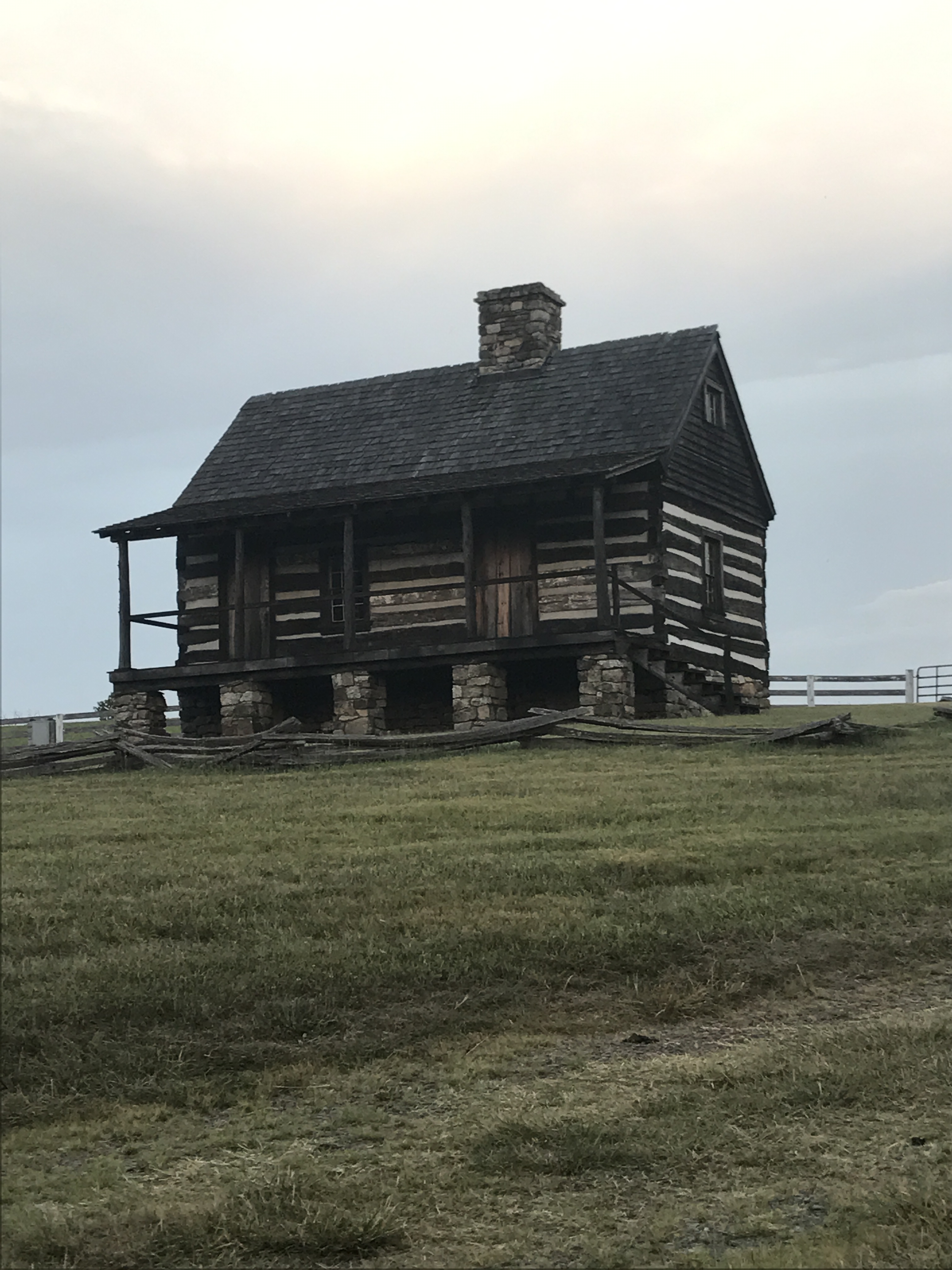
Sam Black's Tavern 2017

The cabin was built by Samuel Black, the son of Rev. Samuel Black, Albemarle County's first Presbyterian minister. The cabin originally sat adjacent to U.S. Route 250 at the front of the Seven Oaks property, the building's original site. In 1978, the tavern was moved away from the road further into the Seven Oaks property. The tavern was dismantled and moved again to Mirador Farm in 2001. The single story and garret, v-notched log building has the basic form and appearance it had attained by 1930. Most of the wall logs are original, and other construction materials are older materials reused from other contexts. The building features a wood-shingled gable roof, a granite foundation and interior chimney, a front porch on skinned cedar log posts, and six-over-six windows. The interior is divided into two rooms by a log partition and the stone chimney, which includes two fireplaces and a bread warmer. Other interior features include exposed log walls, batten doors on strap hinges, hewn ceiling joists, and pegged floor boards.

There were several notable visitors who went to the tavern. Thomas Jefferson stopped at Black's Tavern eleven recorded times between 1768 and 1772, according to his memorandum books. This was while he was practicing law in Albemarle County and surrounding areas and traveling frequently to Staunton, located over the Blue Ridge. Often Jefferson stopped at Black's for meals or to feed his horse. In August 1768, he noted that the visit included entertainment, his term for an overnight stay. Another famous visitor was George Rogers Clark, who stayed overnight in 1777. Meriwether Lewis also stopped at the cabin at least once.

== See also ==
- Ramsay (Greenwood, Virginia)
- Emmanuel Church (Greenwood, Virginia)
