= Folly (Staunton, Virginia) =

Historic house in Virginia, United States

- U.S. National Register of Historic Places
- Virginia Landmarks Register
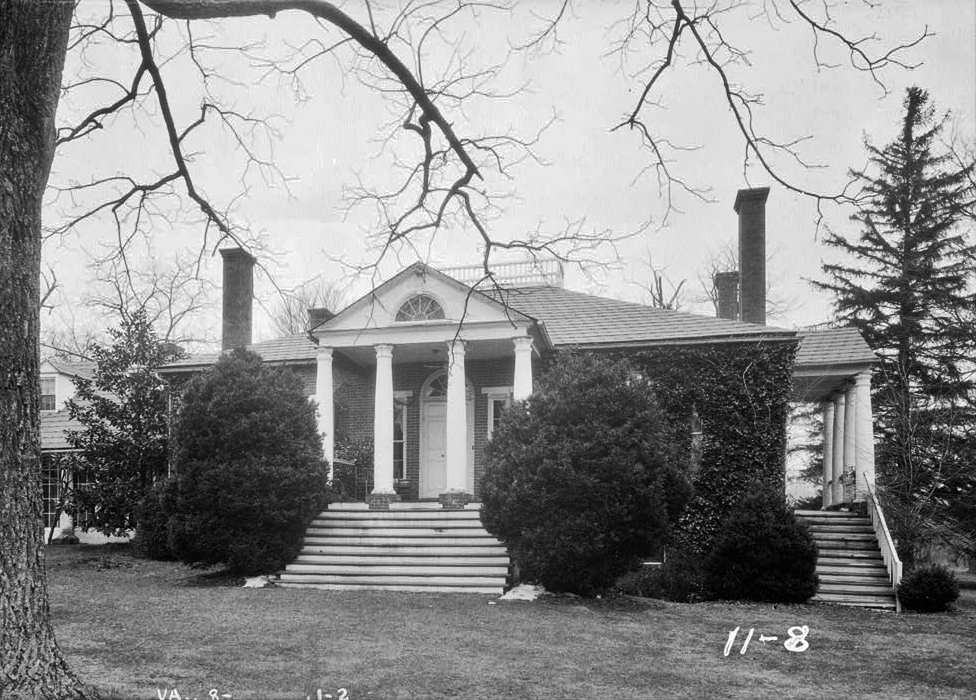

- Location within Virginia Location within the United States
- Location: South of Staunton on U.S. 11, near Staunton, Virginia
- Coordinates: 38°05′21″N 79°06′05″W
- Area: 570 acres (230 ha)
- Built: c. 1818
- Architectural style: Early Republic, Jeffersonian Classicism
- NRHP reference No.: 73001995
- VLR No.: 007-0015

Significant dates
- Added to NRHP: October 25, 1973
- Designated VLR: September 18, 1973

Folly is a historic plantation house located near Staunton, Augusta County, Virginia. The one-story, porticoed, brick structure was built about 1818 in the Jeffersonian style, although Jefferson is not known to have designed it. As of 2024, the house remains in the hands of the descendants of the original owner.

It was listed on the National Register of Historic Places in 1973.

== History and description ==
Joseph Smith served in the House of Delegates in 1817, where he might have interacted with Thomas Jefferson. Construction of the house began the following year. While the dwelling clearly shows the influence of Jefferson's distinctive interpretation of Palladian forms, no documentary evidence has come to light indicating that Jefferson had a direct hand in its design. Smith may have known the owner of Edgemont near Covesville, Virginia, which Folly closely resembles. Smith undoubtedly knew Jefferson's buildings at the University of Virginia as he copied its serpentine walls for his garden. According to family lore, the house's long, low service wing was the first part built and served as the residence while the rest of the house was being built. The farm was the site of the first public demonstration of Cyrus McCormick's reaper in July 1839.

"The house was built about 1818, and is a one-story, brick structure with a full basement. It has a deck-on-hip roof with a simple wooden balustrade around the deck. The main cornice is a simple molded brick one typical of Shenandoah Valley farmhouses. Enhancing the formality of the mass are two slender interior-end chimneys located on each of the side walls. The walls are laid in very fine Flemish bond with narrow mortar joints. It has an original rear ell fronted by a Tuscan colonnade. The front facade features a tetrastyle pedimented portico with stuccoed Tuscan columns and a simple lunette in the pediment. A similar portico is on the north side and a third portico was replaced by a wing added in 1856. Also on the property are associated original brick serpentine walls, a spring house, smokehouse and icehouse."

== See also ==
- Folly Mills Creek

== Bibliography ==
- Nutt, Joe (2007). Historic Houses of Augusta County, Virginia: Pen & Ink Drawings of Fifty-two Homes with Historical Narratives. The Humphries Press. ISBN 978-1-4243-3276-2.
