= Blue Ridge Farm =

Blue Ridge Farm may refer to:

- Blue Ridge Farm (Greenwood, Virginia), listed on the National Register of Historic Places in Albemarle County, Virginia
- Blue Ridge Farm (Upperville, Virginia), a different farm run by Cary Travers Grayson and listed on the National Register of Historic Places in Fauquier County, Virginia
