= Milton L. Grigg =

American architect

Milton Grigg (1905–1982) was an American architect from Virginia, best known for his restoration work at Colonial Williamsburg and Monticello. In his career as an independent architect in Charlottesville, he worked as a modernist within the Jeffersonian tradition. K. Edward Lay, author of The Architecture of Jefferson County, called Grigg "one of the premier architectural restoration/preservationists of his time – always with an inquisitive mind on the forefront of architectural inquiry".

== Biography ==
Grigg was born in Alexandria, Virginia. He studied architecture at the University of Virginia in the late-1920s. Between 1929 and 1933, he worked on restorations at Colonial Williamsburg. In 1933, he established his office in Charlottesville. Floyd Johnson was added as a partner in 1936. That partnership lasted until 1940, when Grigg associated with William Newton Hale, Jr.. By 1977, the firm was known as Grigg, Wood and Browne.

== Notable works ==
- Beverley Hills Community United Methodist Church (Alexandria, Virginia)
- Emmanuel Church (Greenwood, Virginia), Greenwood, Virginia
- Ramsay (Greenwood, Virginia), Greenwood, Virginia
- Braddock Street United Methodist Church (Winchester, Virginia)
- Marquis Memorial United Methodist Church (Staunton, Virginia)
- Hollymead, restoration, 1937, (Charlottesville, Virginia)
- Edgemont (Covesville, Virginia), renovation, 1948
- Moorefield Presbyterian Church, renovation, 1964, (Moorefield, West Virginia)
- Delta Tau Delta Founders House, renovation, 1970s, (Bethany, West Virginia)
- The Valley Road Cottage, 1937, (Charlottesville, Virginia)
- Heritage Baptist Church, 1970, (Annapolis, Maryland)
