= Folly Mills Creek =

River in Virginia, United States

Coordinates: 38°05′02″N 79°02′27″W

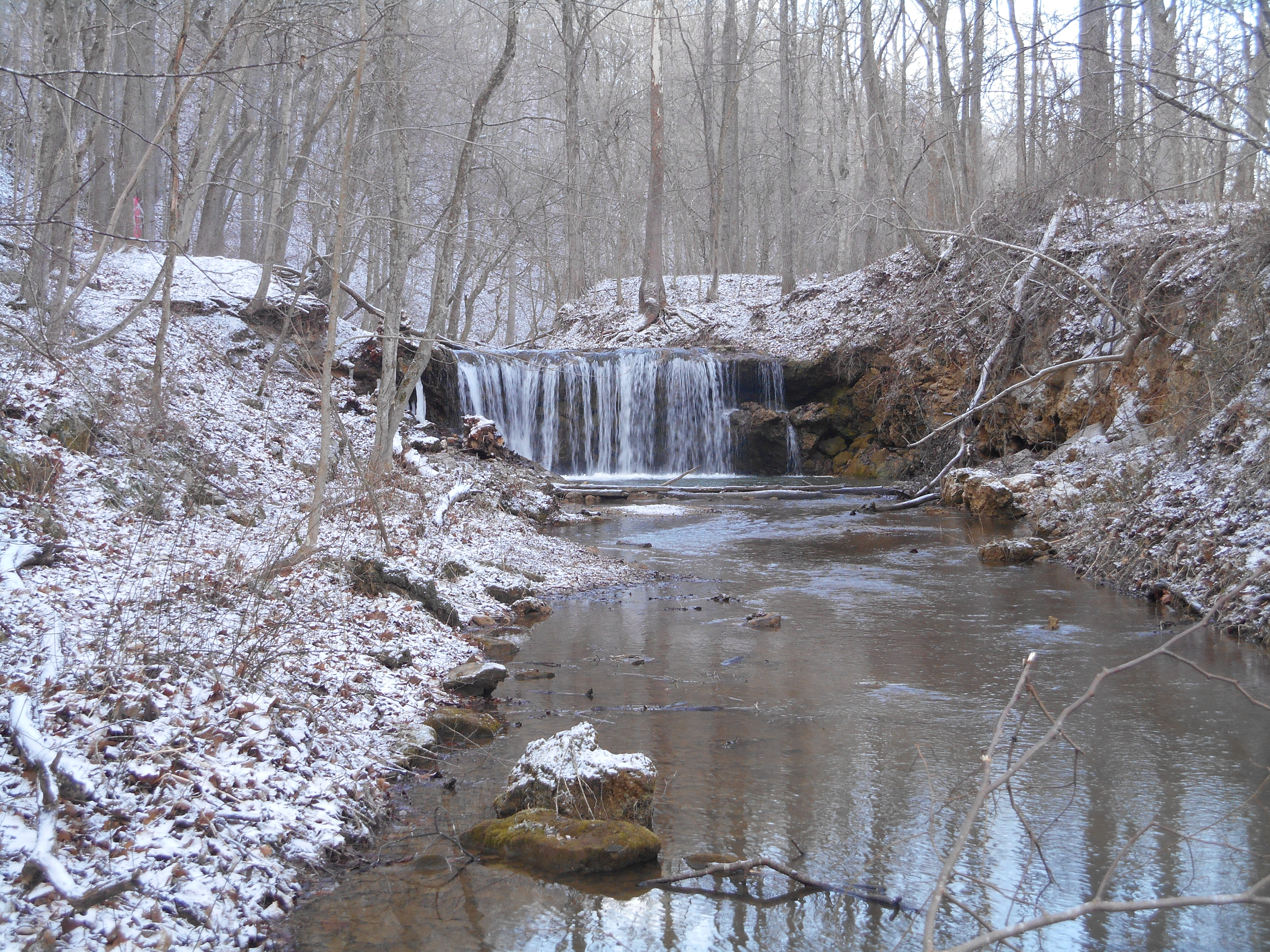
Folly Mills Falls in the snow

Folly Mills Creek is a tributary of Christians Creek in Augusta County, Virginia. Located approximately 5 miles SSW of Staunton, Virginia, it features Folly Mills Falls.

== See also ==
- Folly (Staunton, Virginia)
- Folly Mills Creek Fen Natural Area Preserve
- List of rivers of Virginia
