= Emmanuel Church (Greenwood, Virginia) =

Historic church in Virginia, US

- U.S. National Register of Historic Places
- Virginia Landmarks Register
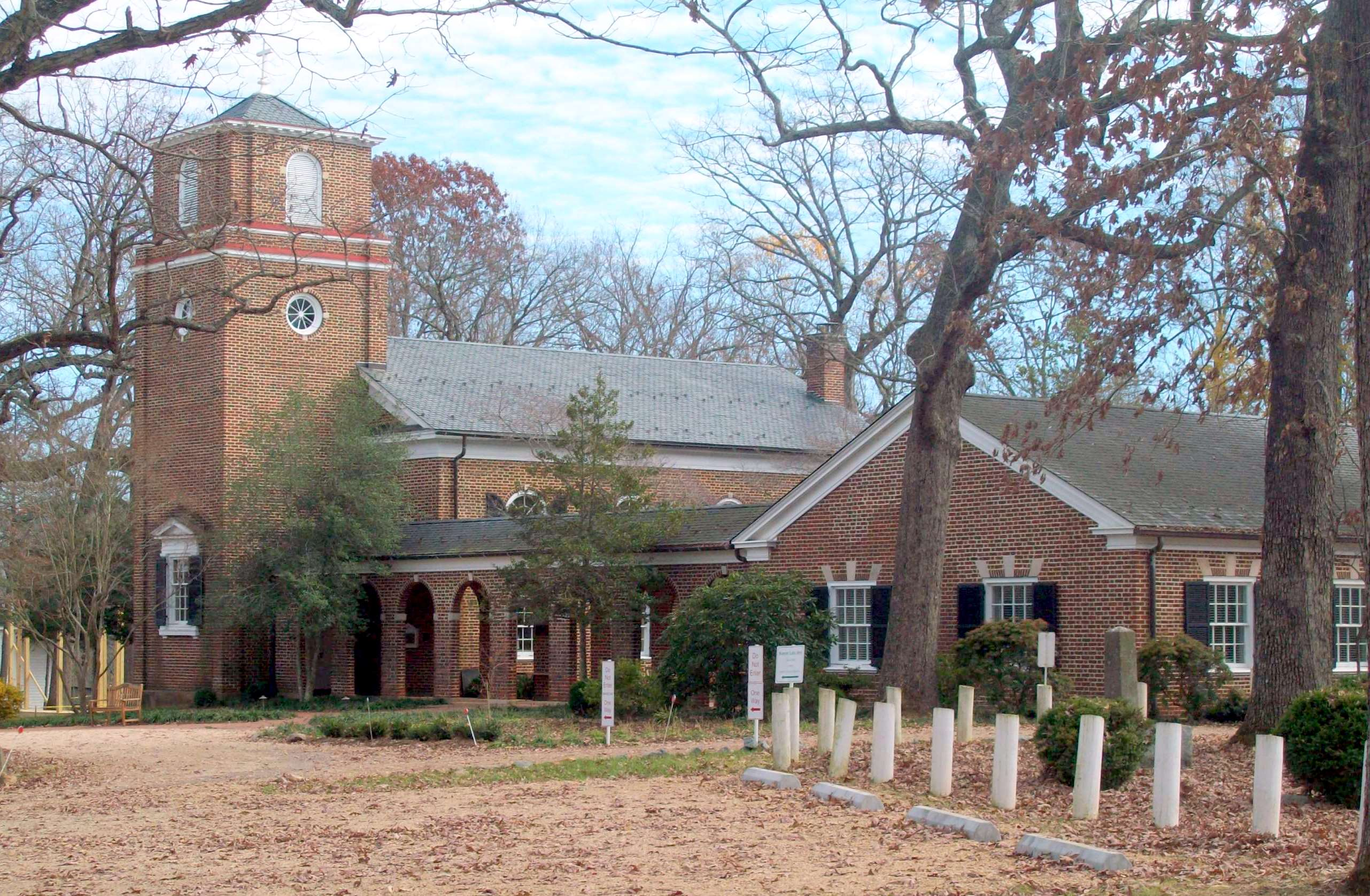
- Emmanuel Church, November 2010

- Location within Virginia Location within the United States
- Nearest city: US 250, Greenwood, Virginia
- Coordinates: 38°1′59″N 78°45′48″W
- Area: 6 acres (2.4 ha)
- Built: 1863
- Architect: Wood, Waddy
- Architectural style: Colonial Revival
- NRHP reference No.: 82004535
- VLR No.: 002-0399

Significant dates
- Added to NRHP: July 8, 1982
- Designated VLR: January 20, 1981, 1981

Emmanuel Church is a historic Episcopal church located at Greenwood in Albemarle County, Virginia. Emmanuel Episcopal Church is a parish church of the Episcopal Diocese of Virginia.

The mission of Emmanuel Episcopal Church is: ""May we live in Christ and seek to do His Work from this place."

== History of Emmanuel Church ==
In the 1850s church members began meeting in homes and then in a Baptist church in Hillsboro. The first service in the new building was on Christmas Day 1863 with preaching by Reverend Dabney C. T. Davis. In 1868 the church entered into an agreement with St. Paul's – Ivy to share a rector and resources. In 1899 the church planted St. Georges Chapel where services were held from 1899 to 1941. In 1900 Archdeacon Neve established the Church of the Holy Cross near Batesville as a mission of Emmanuel.

The original church was built in 1863, Thomas Conrad Bowen (Grandfather of James Armistead Shirley Sr. of Greenwood) gave the original building materials for the Church, with additions and modifications made in 1905 and 1911. The 1911 modifications were largely financed by children of Chiswell Langhorne, including Nancy Astor, Viscountess Astor. These modifications were designed by architect Waddy Butler Wood (1869-1944). The church consists of a narthex located in the bell tower, nave with gallery, and chancel flanked by two small rooms. It is a rectangular brick building with a slate roof. The parish hall was doubled in size and restorations made to the church about 1940 by Charlottesville architect Milton L. Grigg (1905-1982). Arcades connect the church to the parish hall and form a cloistered courtyard. It was added to the National Register of Historic Places in 1982.

== Rectors ==
- Rev. Dabney C. T. Davis, 1860-1864
- Rev. Samuel R. Slack, 1864 – 1865
- Rev. William Clement Butler, 1866-1867
- Rev. William Meade Nelson, 1867-1871
- Rev. John Albert Greaves, 1874-1884
- Rev. George Moseley Murray, 1884
- Rev. John Armitage Farrar, 1887
- Rev. Frederick W. Neve, 1888 – 1905
- Rev. Walter Russell Bowie, 1908-1911
- Rev. Clifford D. Powers, 1912-1915
- Rev. Campbell Mayers, 1915-1921
- Rev. Edward H. Vogt, 1923-1925
- Rev. John Scott Meredith, 1926-1957
- Rev. H. Lee Marston, 1937-1969
- Rev. Howard A. LaRue, 1969-1995
- Rev. Charles A. Mullaly, 1997-2012
- Rev. Christopher Garcia, 2013-2017

== Gallery ==
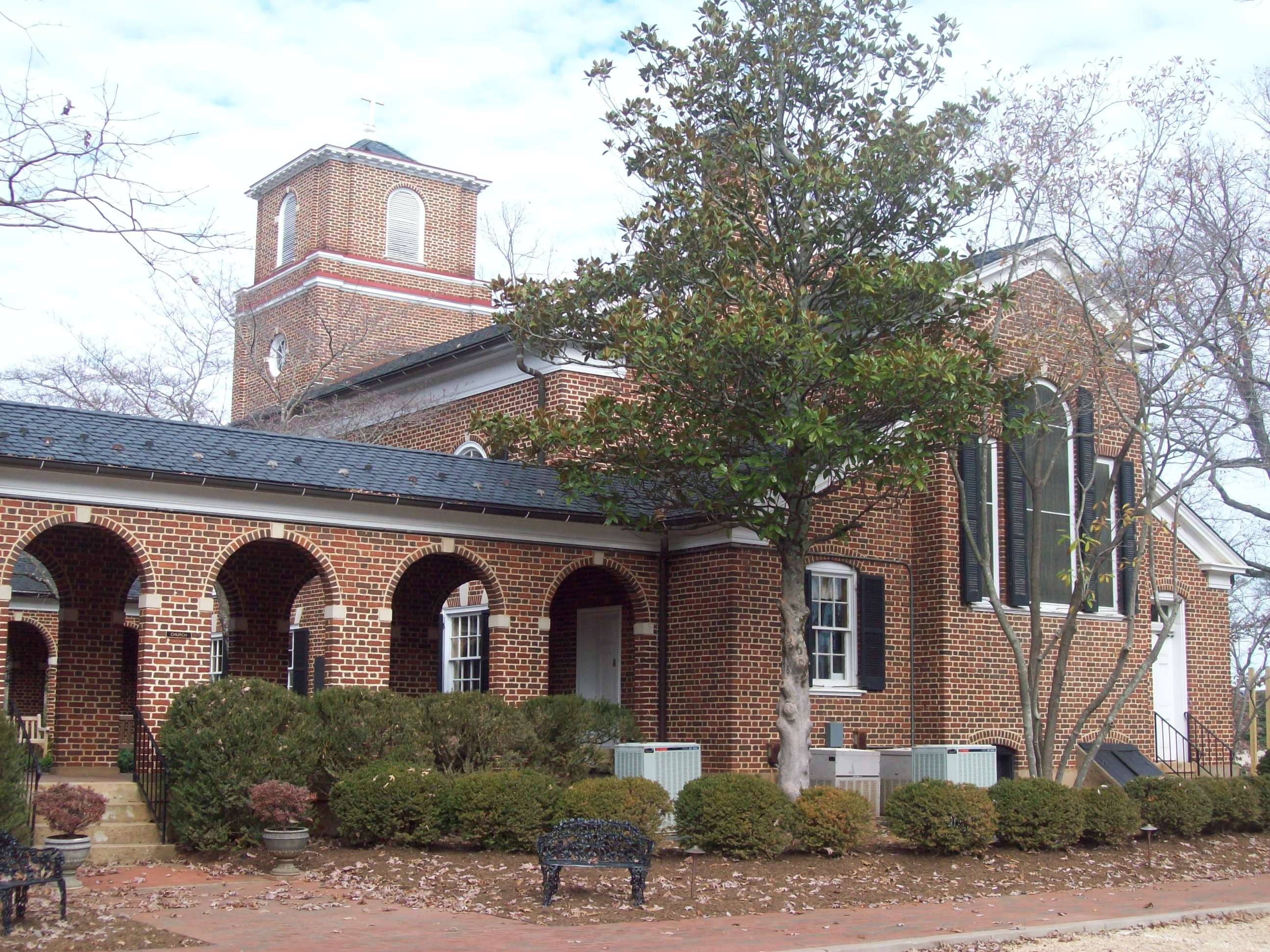
Emmanuel Church Rear View, November 2010

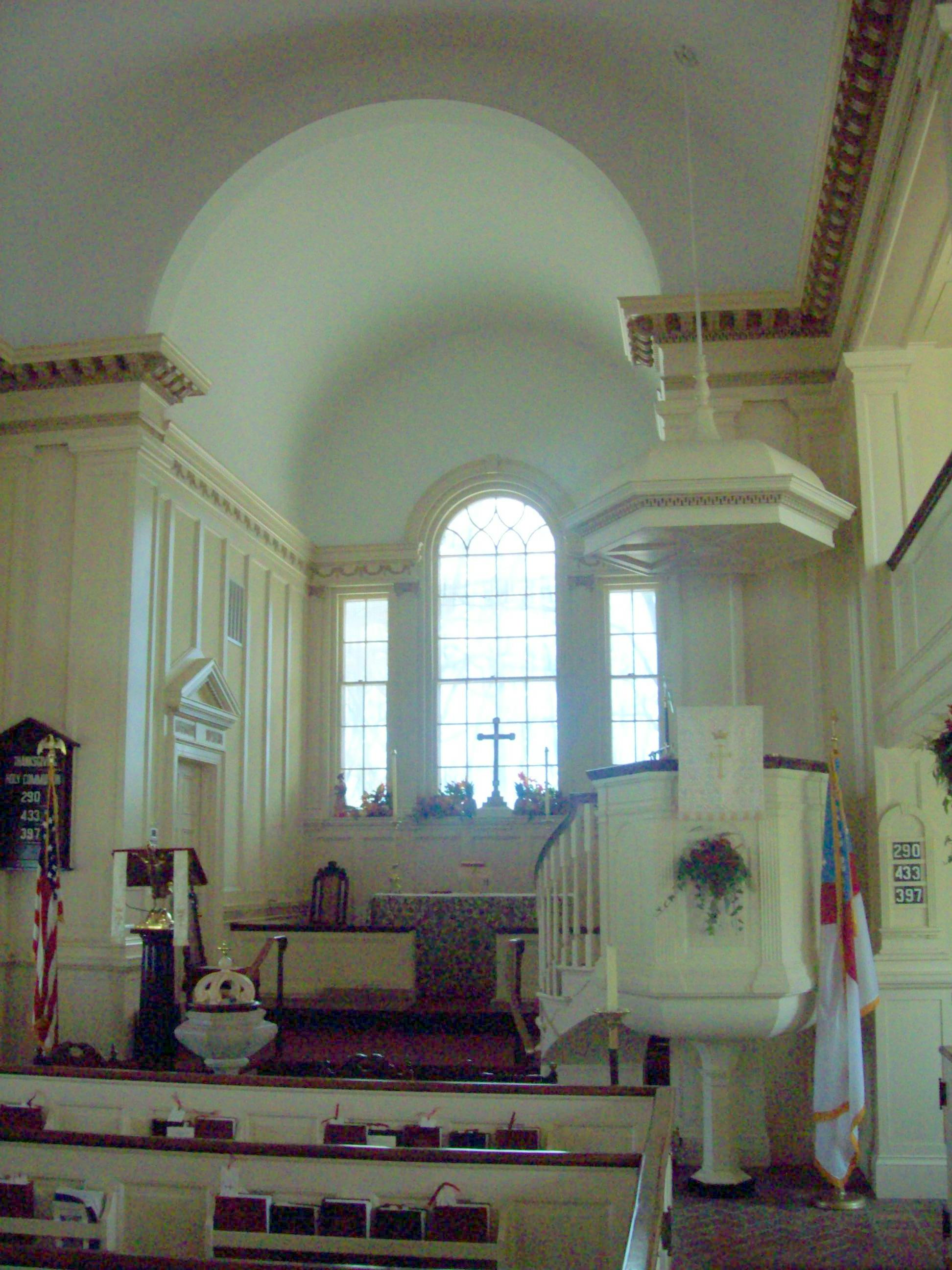
Emmanuel Church, Interior View, November 2010

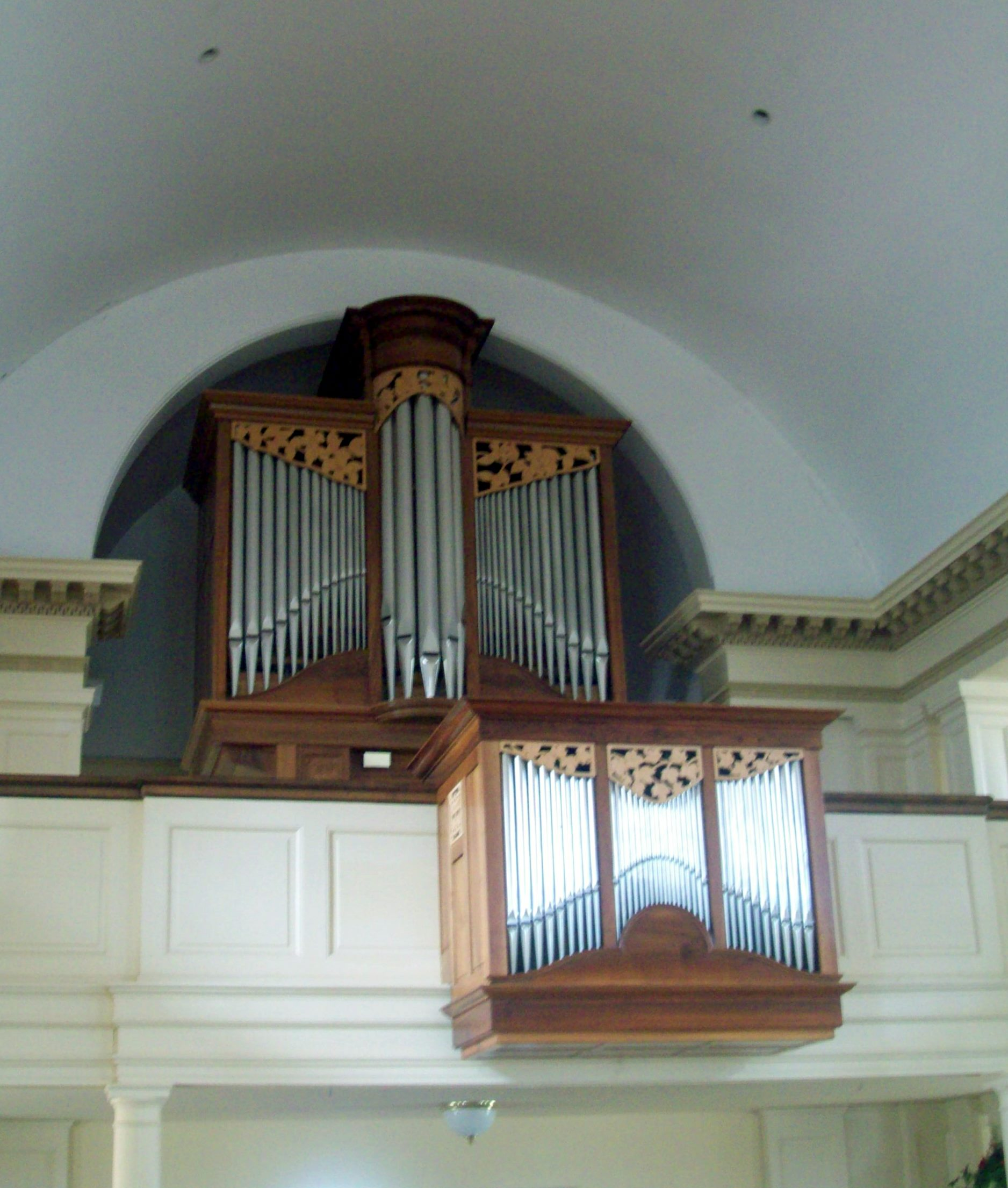
Emmanuel Church, Organ Loft View, November 2010

== References and Sources ==
- Jubilee – The Emmanuel Family – 1860-1985 – a comprehensive record of Emmanuel’s history from 1860 – 1985 compiled by Rev. Howard LaRue.

== See also ==
- Ramsay (Greenwood, Virginia)
- Mirador (Greenwood, Virginia)
