= Redlands (Covesville, Virginia) =

Historic house in Virginia, United States

- U.S. National Register of Historic Places
- U.S. Historic district – Contributing property
- Virginia Landmarks Register
- Drawing of the house

- Location within Virginia Location within the United States
- Location: Junction of VA 708 and VA 627, near Covesville, Virginia
- Coordinates: 37°55′04″N 78°31′50″W
- Area: 1,200 acres (490 ha)
- Built: c. 1798-1808
- Architectural style: Georgian, Federal, Tidewater Georgian
- NRHP reference No.: 69000218
- VLR No.: 002-0067

Significant dates
- Added to NRHP: November 12, 1969
- Designated VLR: September 9, 1969

Redlands is a historic home located near Covesville, Albemarle County, Virginia. It was built between about 1798 and 1808, and is a rectangular two-story, five-bay, brick structure covered by a hipped roof in the Federal style. It features a Tuscan order front porch. Its interior is notable for its fine Adamesque woodwork. The master builder of the house was Martin Thacker, of neighboring Cedar Grove. It was built for Robert Carter, grandson of John Carter, around the time of his marriage to Mary Eliza Coles of neighboring Enniscorthy.

It was added to the National Register of Historic Places in 1969.
