= Cove Presbyterian Church =

Historic church in Virginia, United States

- U.S. National Register of Historic Places
- Virginia Landmarks Register
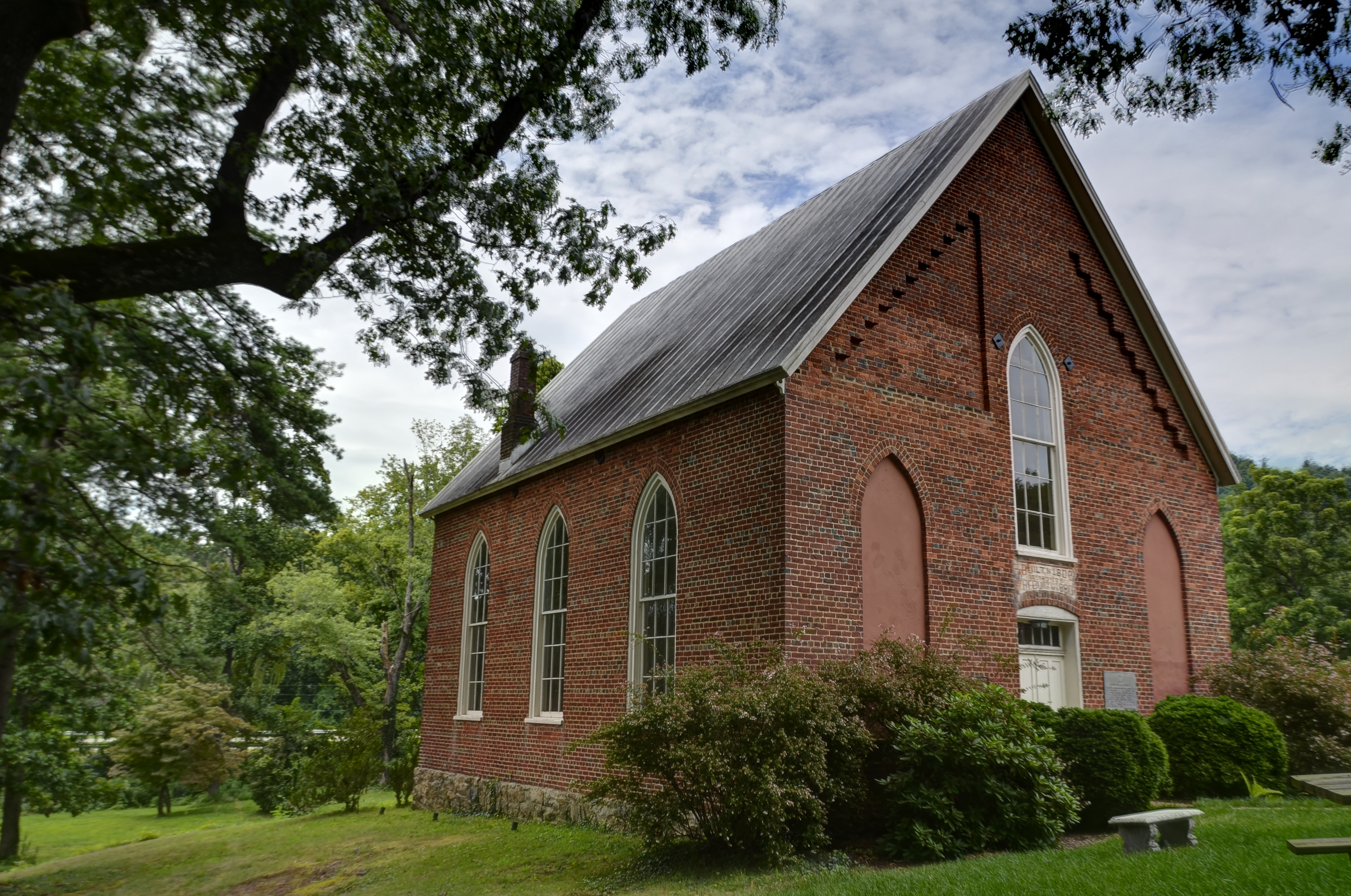

- Location within Virginia Location within the United States
- Location: US 29, N of VA 699, Covesville, Virginia
- Coordinates: 37°52′37″N 78°42′54″W
- Area: 3.5 acres (1.4 ha)
- Built: 1809
- Architectural style: Gothic Revival, Builder's Gothic
- NRHP reference No.: 89001935
- VLR No.: 002-0705

Significant dates
- Added to NRHP: November 2, 1989
- Designated VLR: April 18, 1989

Cove Presbyterian Church, also known as Cove Meeting House and Rich Cove, is a historic Presbyterian church located at Covesville, Albemarle County, Virginia. It was built in 1809 and is a one-story, rectangular one-room, brick building. The building was rebuilt and renovated in 1880 after it was destroyed by a tornado on June 12, 1880. It features Gothic arched windows and a steeply pitched gable roof. It was built for a congregation established in 1747, and has remained in continuous use.

It was added to the National Register of Historic Places in 1989.
