= The Cedars (Greenwood, Virginia) =

Historic house in Virginia, United States

- U.S. National Register of Historic Places
- Virginia Landmarks Register
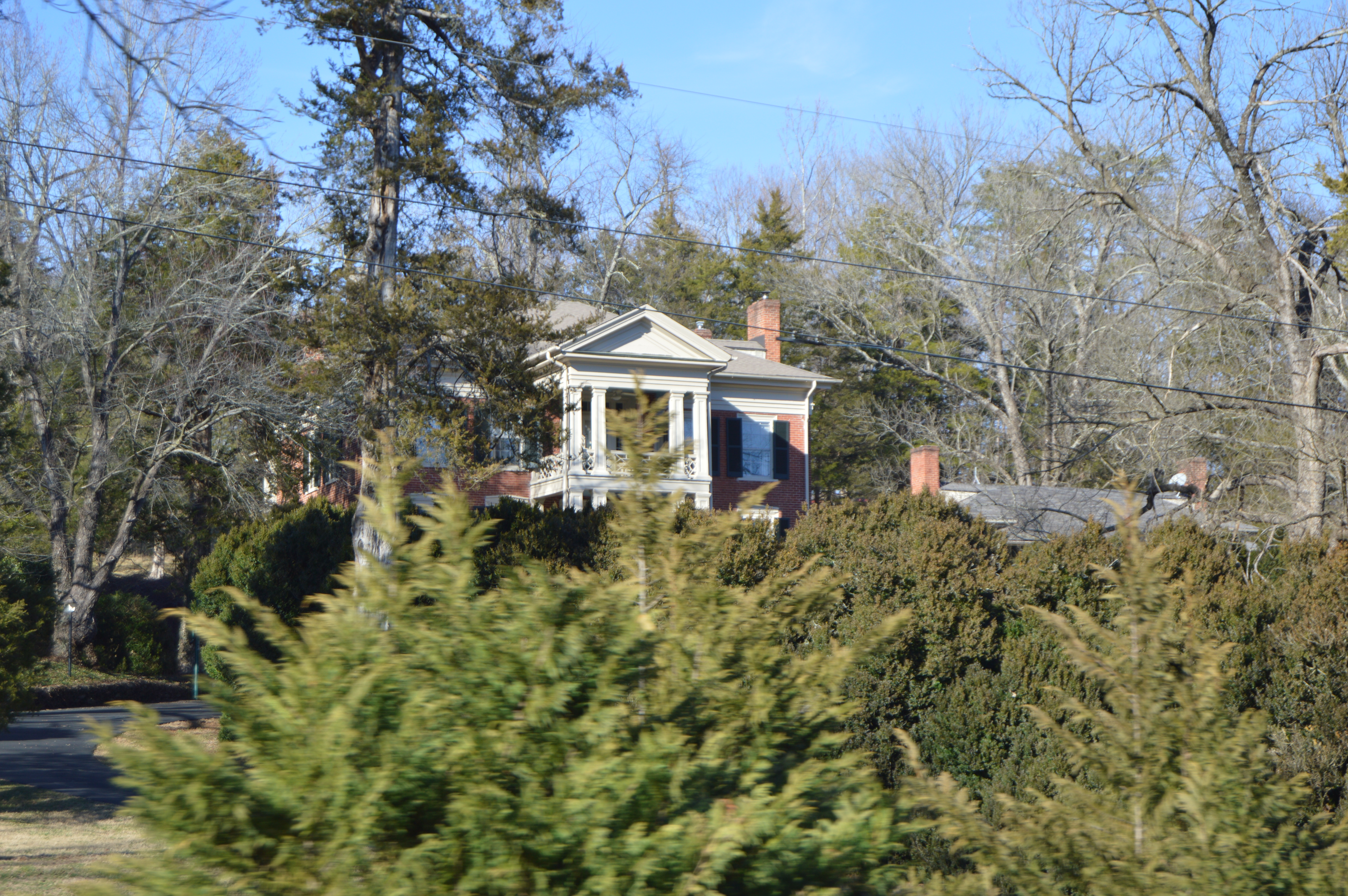
- Seen from US 250

- Location within Virginia Location within the United States
- Location: U.S. Route 250, west of Interstate 64, near Greenwood, Virginia
- Coordinates: 38°2′28″N 78°44′20″W
- Area: 10.1 acres (4.1 ha)
- Architectural style: Greek Revival
- NRHP reference No.: 89001909
- VLR No.: 002-0086

Significant dates
- Added to NRHP: December 27, 1990
- Designated VLR: April 18, 1989

The Cedars, also known as Cocke's Tavern and The Casino, is a historic home located near Greenwood, Albemarle County, Virginia. It was built about 1850–1860, and is a large, two-story, five-bay, hipped-roof brick house in the Greek Revival style. It has a full grade-level basement, paired gable end chimneys, and prominent front and back porches. The front porch is two-stories and has a striking pediment. Also on the property is a contributing kitchen / servants quarter. The house has served as a residence, a boys' school, Civil War hospital, tanyard business and gambling casino, as well as (possibly) a tavern. It is considered one of the most architecturally distinguished antebellum houses in western Albemarle County.

There have been some claims of ghost sightings and haunted activities on the property.

It was added to the National Register of Historic Places in 1990.
