= Piedmont (Greenwood, Virginia) =

Historic house in Virginia, United States

- U.S. National Register of Historic Places
- Virginia Landmarks Register
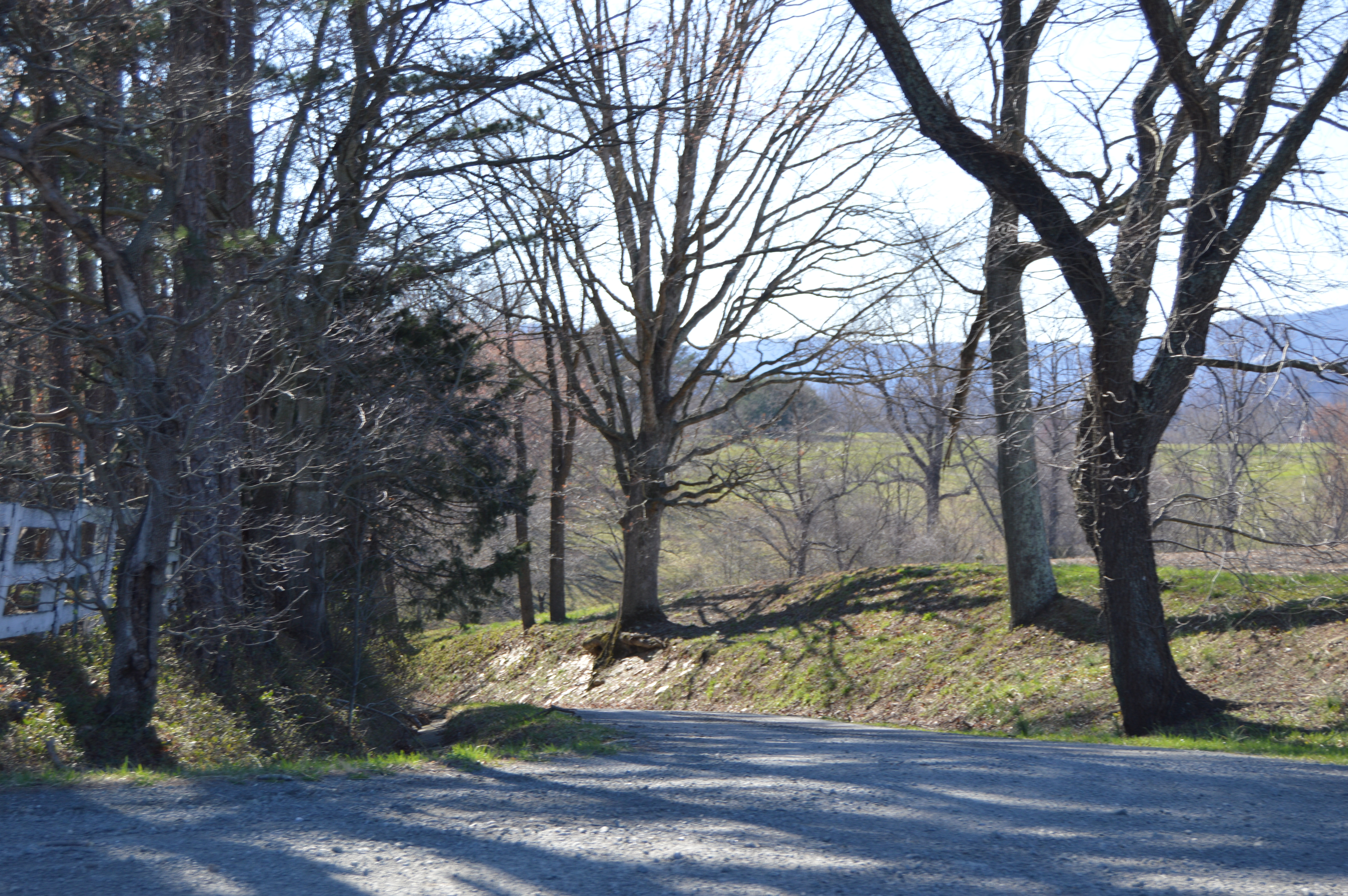
- Entrance to the property

- Location within Virginia Location within the United States
- Location: Junction of I-64 and VA 691, near Greenwood, Virginia
- Coordinates: 38°2′39″N 78°46′36″W
- Area: 52 acres (21 ha)
- Built: 1838
- Architectural style: Greek Revival, Federal
- NRHP reference No.: 90002184
- VLR No.: 002-0114

Significant dates
- Added to NRHP: February 1, 1991
- Designated VLR: December 11, 1990

Piedmont is a historic home and farm located near Greenwood, Albemarle County, Virginia. The main house was built in two sections. The older sections is a two-story, three-bay, gable-roofed log half (now stuccoed), that was built possibly as early as the late-18th century. Attached perpendicular to the log section is a two-story, gable roofed brick half built in 1838. The house exhibits Greek Revival and Federal design details. Also on the property are a log smokehouse, log slave cabin and the ruins of a large stone chimney and hearth.

It was added to the National Register of Historic Places in 1991.
