= Edgemont (Covesville, Virginia) =

Historic house in Virginia, United States

- U.S. National Register of Historic Places
- U.S. Historic district – Contributing property
- Virginia Landmarks Register
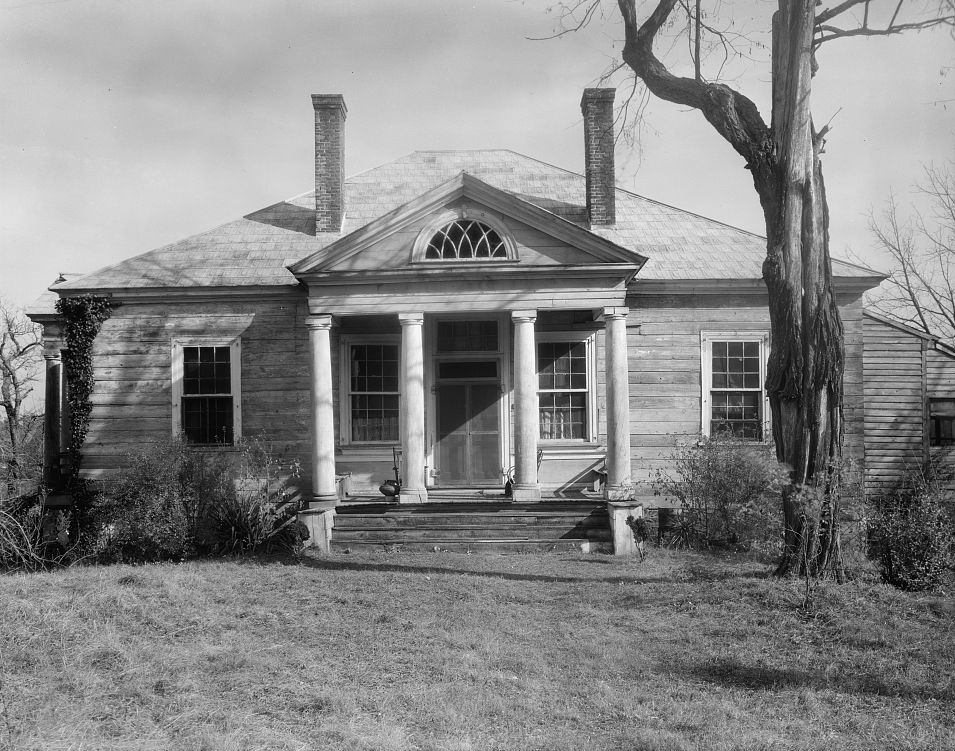
- Edgemont, Carnegie Survey of the Architecture of the South, 1935

- Location within Virginia Location within the United States
- Location: Junction of VA 708 and VA 627, near Covesville, Virginia
- Coordinates: 37°54′16″N 78°36′55″W
- Area: 30 acres (12 ha)
- Built: c. 1796
- Architect: Jefferson, Thomas; Grigg, Milton
- Architectural style: Early Republic, Jeffersonian
- NRHP reference No.: 80004162
- VLR No.: 002-0087

Significant dates
- Added to NRHP: November 28, 1980
- Designated VLR: September 16, 1980

Edgemont, also known as Cocke Farm, is a historic home located near Covesville, Albemarle County, Virginia. It was built about 1796, and is a one- to two-story, three-bay, frame structure in the Jeffersonian style. It measures 50 feet by 50 feet, and sits on a stuccoed stone exposed basement. The house is topped by a hipped roof surmounted by four slender chimneys. The entrances feature pedimented Tuscan order portico that consists of Tuscan columns supporting a full entablature. Also on the property is a rubble stone garden outbuilding with a hipped roof. The house was restored in 1948 by Charlottesville architect Milton Grigg (1905–1982). Its design closely resembles Folly near Staunton, Virginia.

It was added to the National Register of Historic Places in 1980.
