= Casa Maria =

Historic house in Virginia, United States

- U.S. National Register of Historic Places
- Virginia Landmarks Register
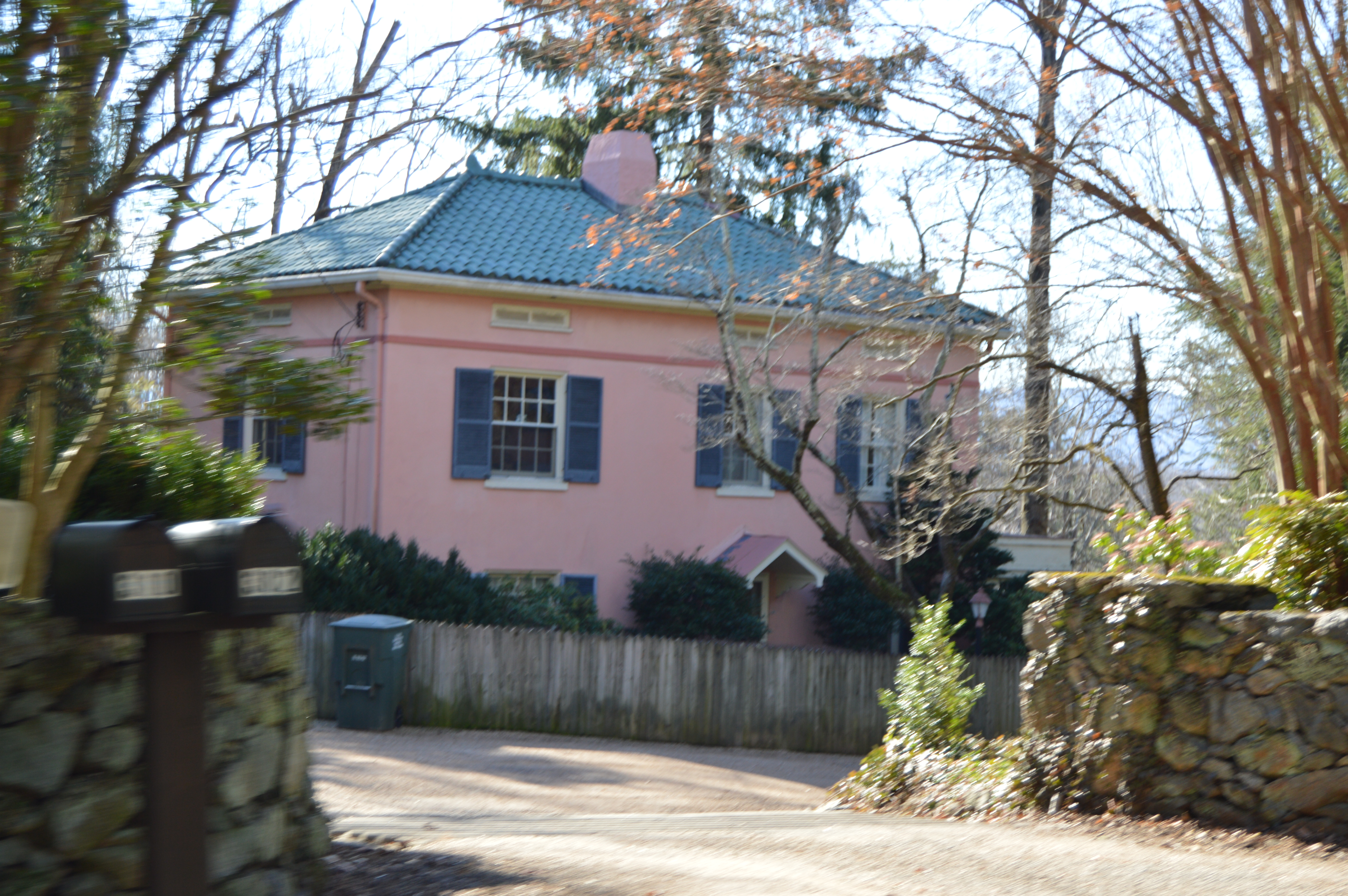
- One of the larger outbuildings

- Location within Virginia Location within the United States
- Location: VA 691 south of the junction with US 250, near Greenwood, Virginia, United States
- Coordinates: 38°1′54″N 78°45′13″W
- Area: 6.5 acres (2.6 ha)
- Built: 1921-1922, 1928
- Architect: Charles F. Gillette, William L. Bottomley
- Architectural style: Colonial Revival, Mission/spanish Revival, Georgian Revival
- NRHP reference No.: 90001999
- VLR No.: 002-0829

Significant dates
- Added to NRHP: December 28, 1990
- Designated VLR: April 17, 1990

Casa Maria is a historic estate located near Greenwood, Albemarle County, Virginia, United States. The main house was built 1921–1922 in the Spanish-Mediterranean style, with a two-story brick addition that dates from 1928, and was designed by architect William Lawrence Bottomley. The main house consists of two perpendicular, 2 1/2-story, stucco wings with a low-pitched hipped roof and low roof hidden by a parapet. It features an enclosed garden with stuccoed walls, arched entrances, and brick paving is located in the angle of the two wings. Also on the property are two Spanish style stuccoed servant's quarters with decorative metal grilles and tile roofs, and several smaller outbuildings. The gardens were designed by noted landscape architect Charles Gillette.

The estate was added to the National Register of Historic Places in 1990.
