= Seven Oaks Farm and Black's Tavern =

Historic home and farm complex in Virginia, United States

- U.S. National Register of Historic Places
- Virginia Landmarks Register
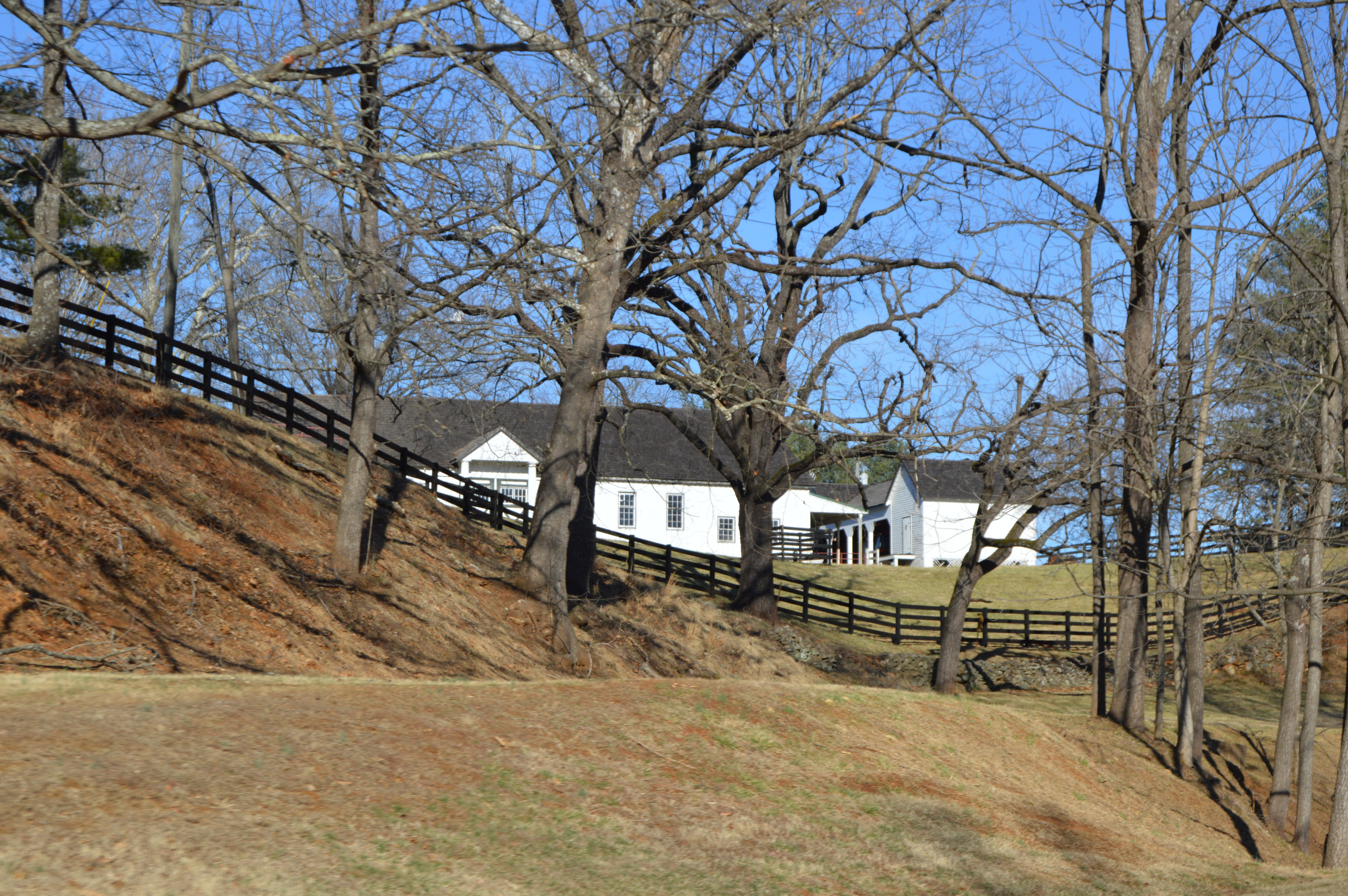
- Barns along US 250

- Location within Virginia Location within the United States
- Location: U.S. Route 250, west of Interstate 64, near Greenwood, Virginia
- Coordinates: 38°2′33″N 78°44′45″W
- Area: 109 acres (44 ha)
- Built: 1847-1848
- Architectural style: Colonial Revival, Greek Revival
- NRHP reference No.: 89001906
- VLR No.: 002-0071

Significant dates
- Added to NRHP: December 26, 1989
- Designated VLR: June 20, 1989

Seven Oaks Farm is a historic home and farm complex located near Greenwood, Albemarle County, Virginia. It was formerly known as Clover Plains and owned by John Garrett, who assisted with building the University of Virginia and was a bursar with the university. After Dr. Garrett's death, the farm was sold to the Bowen family and inherited by the Shirley family. In 1903, it was bought by Marion Langhorne of Richmond, a relative of Chiswell Dabney Langhorne, father of the famous Gibson girls, who lived at nearby Mirador. The land is named after the original seven oak trees on the property named after the first seven presidents born in Virginia. Only one of the original seven trees still standing after six were destroyed in 1954 in the aftermath of Hurricane Hazel. The main house was built about 1847–1848, and is a two-story, five-bay, hipped-roof frame building with a three-bay north wing. The interior features Greek Revival style design details. It has a two-story, pedimented front portico in the Colonial Revival style addition. Sam Black's Tavern is a one-story, two-room, gable-roofed log house with a center chimney and shed-roofed porch. Black's Tavern has since been moved to the adjacent Mirador property circa 1989. It was originally owned by Samuel Black, a Presbyterian minister of the Sam Black Church in West Virginia. Blacksburg, Virginia, was named after the family. Other buildings on the farm include an ice house, smokehouse, dairy, greenhouse, barns, a carriage house, a garage and several residences for farm employees. The ice house on the land, typically framed in an octagonal shape, in fact only has six sides.

It was added to the National Register of Historic Places in 1989.
