= Serpentine shape =

Snake-like curve

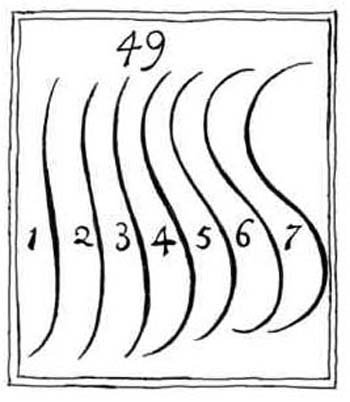
Serpentine lines in a plate from The Analysis of Beauty by William Hogarth

A serpentine shape is any of certain curved shapes of an object or design, which are suggestive of the shape of a snake (the adjective "serpentine" is derived from the word serpent). Serpentine shapes occur in architecture, in furniture, and in mathematics.

== In architecture and urban design ==
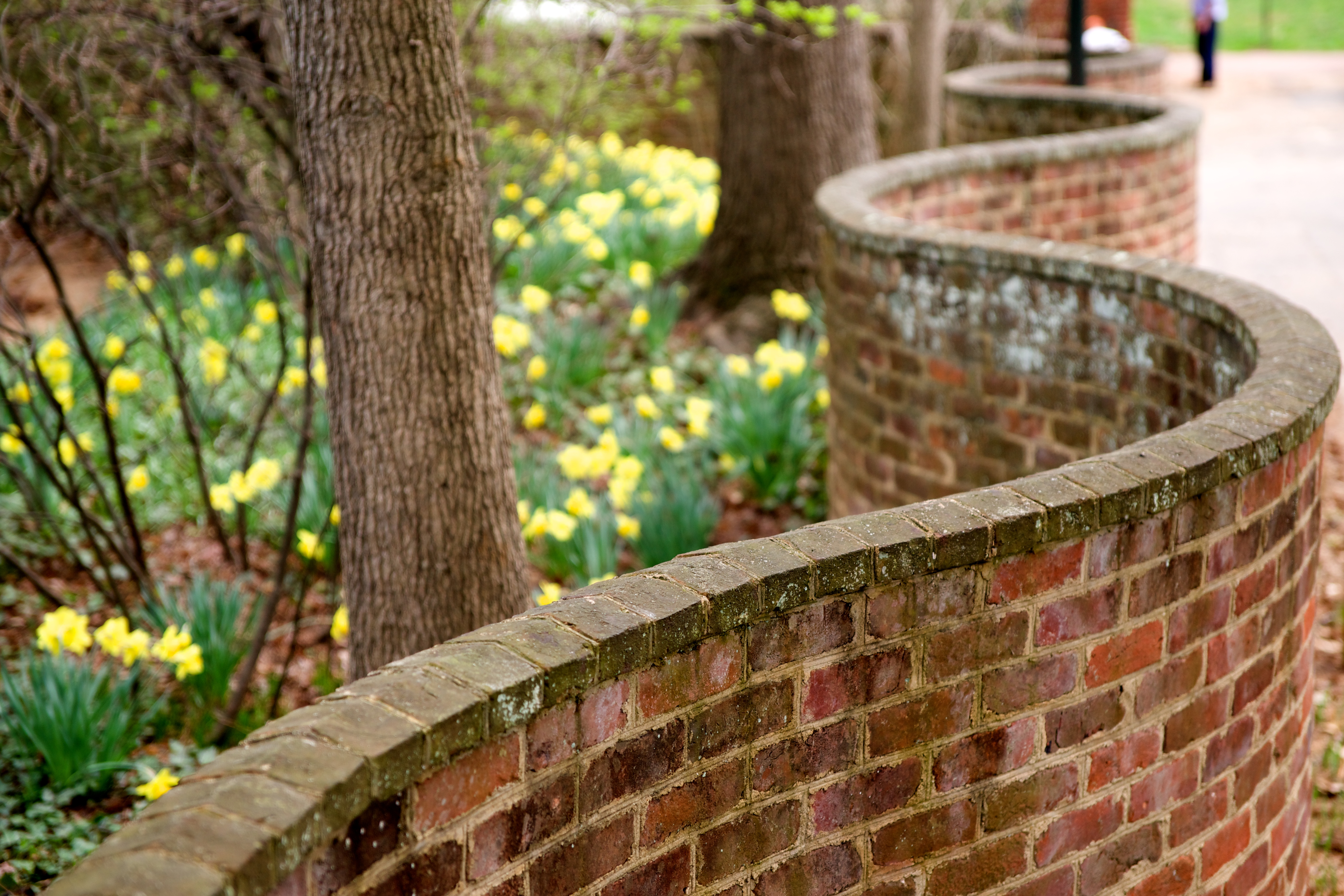
Serpentine walls at the University of Virginia

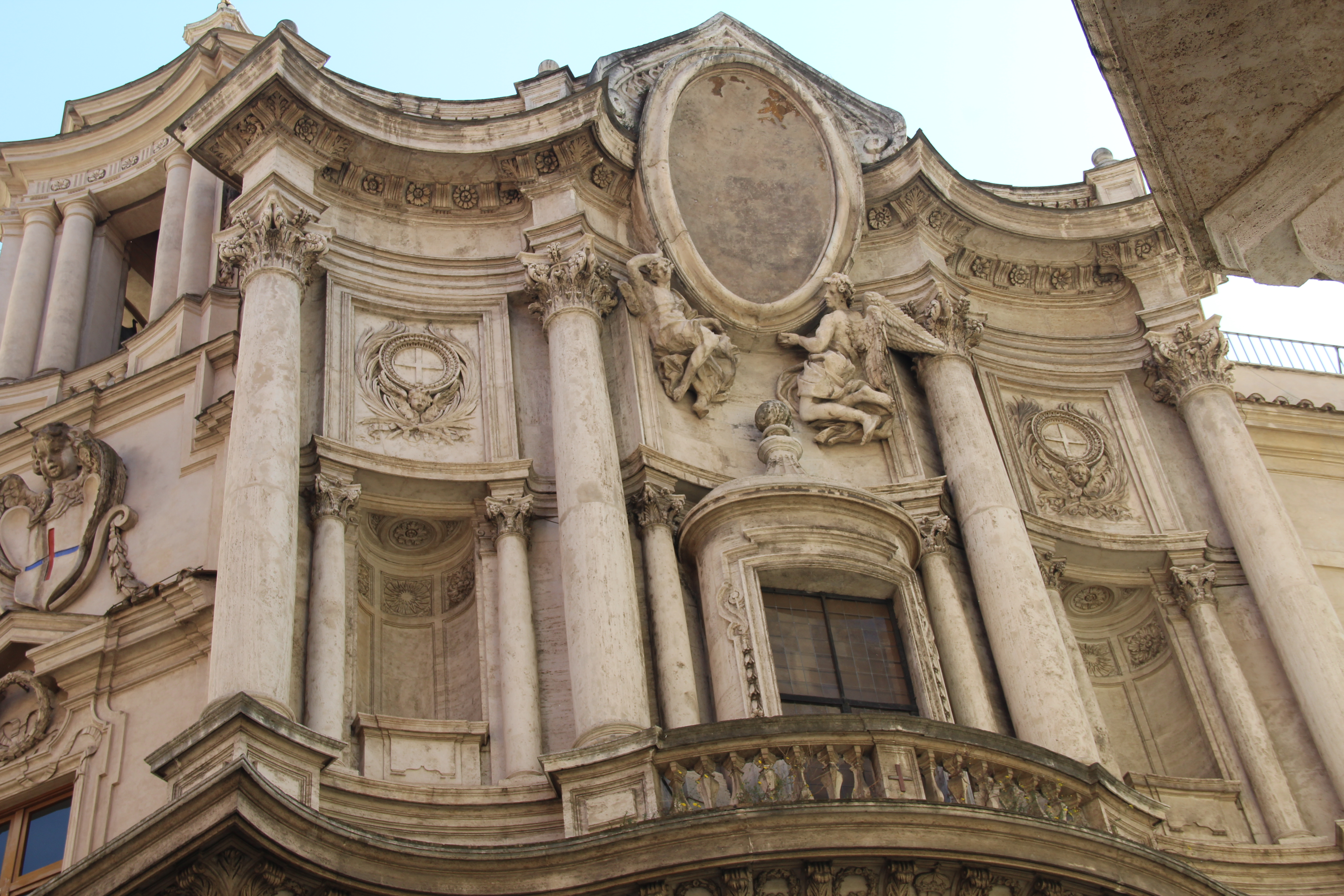
San Carlo alle Quattro Fontane (Four Fountains) facade in Rome, Italy

The serpentine shape is observed in many architectural settings. It may provide strength, as in serpentine walls, it may allow the facade of a building to face in multiple directions, or it may be chosen for purely aesthetic reasons.

- At the University of Virginia, serpentine walls (crinkle crankle walls) extend down the length of the main lawn at the University of Virginia and flank both sides of the rotunda. They are one of the many structures Thomas Jefferson created that combine aesthetics with utility. The sinusoidal path of the wall provides strength against toppling over, allowing the wall to be only a single brick thick.
- At the Massachusetts Institute of Technology, the Baker House dormitory has a serpentine shape which allows most rooms a view of the Charles River, and gives many of the rooms a wedge-shaped layout.
- At San Carlo alle Quattro Fontane, Rome, Italy (The Church of Saint Charles at the Four Fountains), designed by Francesco Borromini, is a serpentine facade constructed towards the end of Borromini's life. The concave-convex facade of the church undulates in a non-classic way. Tall Corinthian columns stand on plinths and support the main entablatures; these define the main framework of two stories and the tripartite bay division. Between the columns, smaller columns with their entablatures weave behind the main columns and in turn they frame many architectural features of the church.
- The London parks Hyde Park and Kensington Gardens contain 'The Serpentine', a lake that spans both parks. It received the name from its snake-like, curving shape. A central bridge divides the lake into two parts, and defines the boundaries between Hyde Park and Kensington Gardens.
- Among Castle Howard's gardens is a large, formal path behind the building, where a serpentine path is situated on a ridge. It opens out from the formal garden and merges back into the park. When buildings and site elements are set into the landscape, a serpentine path connecting every location is placed in-between features. The path merges into the landscape due to the natural shape, which allows convenient garden-path integration.
- A serpentine street is a winding roadway sometimes used to slow traffic in residential neighbourhoods, possibly bordered by landscaping features.

== In furniture ==
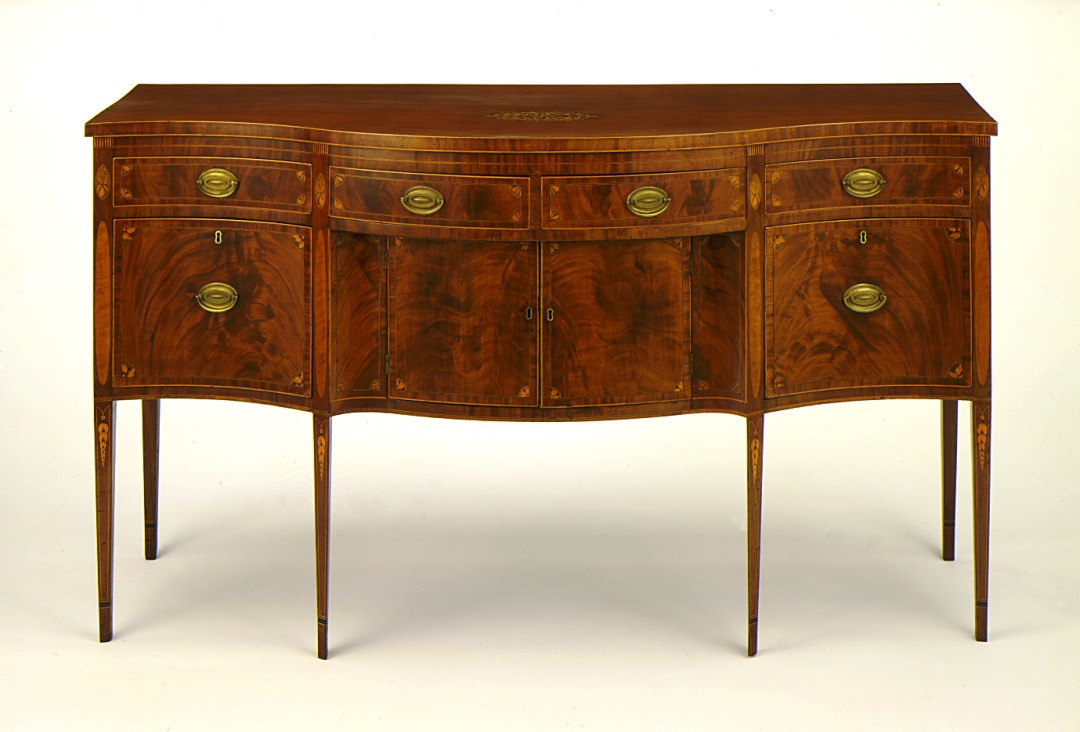
A serpentine-front sideboard (United States, 1785–1800)

In furniture, serpentine-front dressers and cabinets have a convex section between two concave ones. This design was common in the Rococo period. Examples include Louis XV commodes and 18th-century English furniture.

Furniture with a concave section between two convex ones is sometimes referred to as reverse serpentine or oxbow.

== In mathematics ==
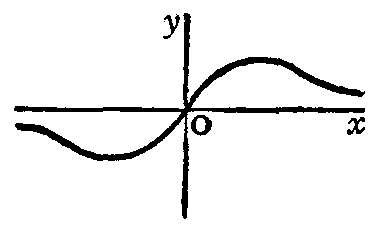
Newton's serpentine curve

The serpentine curve is a cubic curve as described by Isaac Newton, given by the cartesian equation y(a^{2} + x^{2}) = abx. The origin is a point of inflection, the axis of x being an asymptote and the curve lies between the parallel lines 2y = ±b.

== See also ==
- BACH motif
- Serpent (instrument)
- S-curve (art)
- Tribhanga
- Figura serpentinata
