= Greenwood–Afton Rural Historic District =

Historic district in Virginia, United States

- Greenwood-Afton Rural Historic District
- U.S. National Register of Historic Places
- U.S. Historic district
- Virginia Landmarks Register
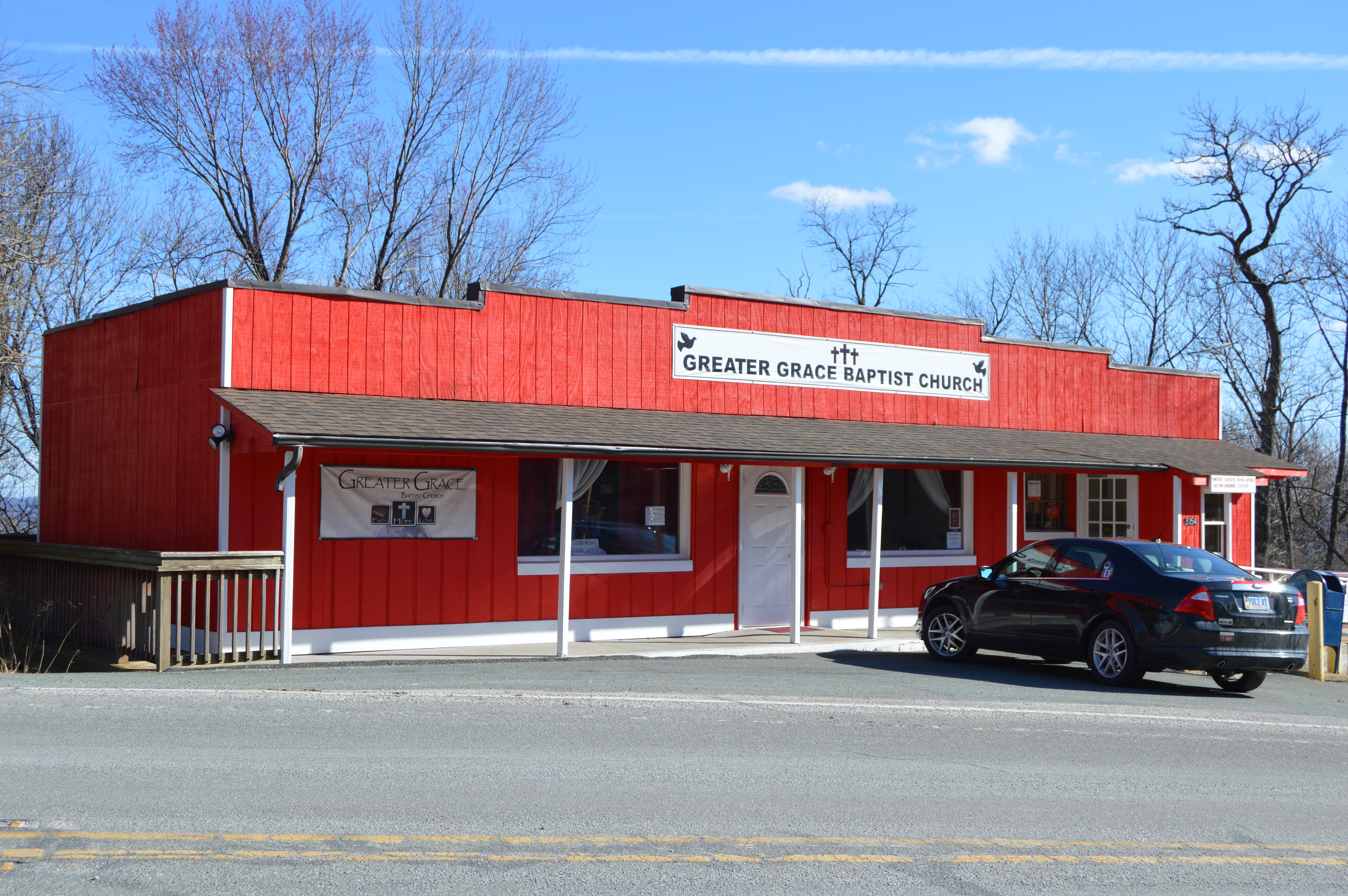
- Afton church and post office

- Location within Virginia Location within the United States
- Location: Roughly 5 miles (8.0 km) to 7 miles (11 km) north and south of I-64, near Greenwood, Virginia
- Coordinates: 38°03′21″N 78°46′12″W
- Area: 16,300 acres (6,600 ha)
- NRHP reference No.: 11000258 (original); 15001053 (increase)
- VLR No.: 002-5075

Significant dates
- Added to NRHP: May 6, 2011
- Boundary increase: February 8, 2016
- Designated VLR: December 16, 2010

Greenwood–Afton Rural Historic District is a national historic district located at Greenwood, Albemarle County, Virginia. The district encompasses 839 contributing buildings, 55 contributing sites, 68 contributing structures, and 2 contributing objects. The district is characterized by large farms, historic villages, and crossroads communities. Ten properties are separately listed on the National Register of Historic Places.

It was added to the National Register of Historic Places in 2011, and enlarged by the addition of two properties in 2016.

== See also ==
- National Register of Historic Places listings in Albemarle County, Virginia
