= Ramsay (Greenwood, Virginia) =

Historic house in Virginia, United States

- U.S. National Register of Historic Places
- Virginia Landmarks Register
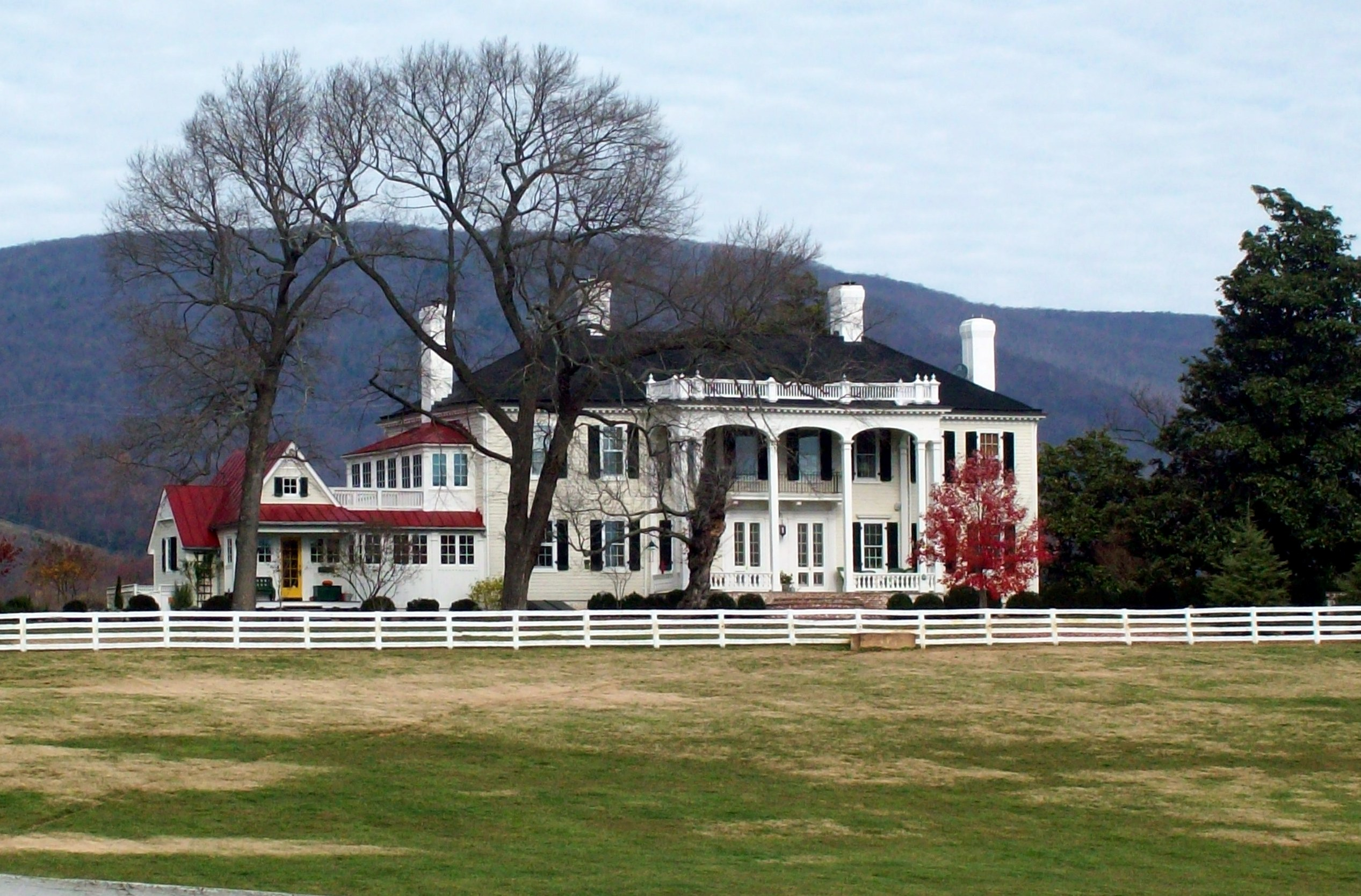
- Ramsay, November 2010

- Location within Virginia Location within the United States
- Location: 7760 Rockfish Gap Turnpike, Greenwood, Virginia
- Coordinates: 38°2′14″N 78°46′13″W
- Area: 78.4 acres (31.7 ha)
- Built: 1900
- Architects: Grigg, Milton La Tour
- Architectural style: Classical Revival
- NRHP reference No.: 05000135
- VLR No.: 002-0844

Significant dates
- Added to NRHP: March 10, 2005
- Designated VLR: December 1, 2004

Ramsay is a historic estate located at Greenwood in Albemarle County, Virginia. Contributing elements on the estate include the main house (c. 1900), barn (c. 1937), garden (c. 1937), cottage (c. 1950), tenant house and garage (c. 1900), main house garage (c. 1900), potting shed (c. 1937), three greenhouse ruins (c. 1939), smoke house, chicken house, equipment shed, slave cabin ruins (c. 1830 and moved 1930), and a circular turnaround (c. 1930's). The main house is a classical Revival style dwelling begun about 1900 with sympathetic additions dated to 1937, 1947, and the early 1950s. The sympathetic additions and modifications, and barn and garden, were designed by noted Charlottesville architect Milton L. Grigg (1905–1982).

It was listed on the National Register of Historic Places in 2009.

== See also ==
- Emmanuel Church (Greenwood, Virginia)
