= Blue Ridge Farm (Greenwood, Virginia) =

Historic house in Virginia, United States

- U.S. National Register of Historic Places
- Virginia Landmarks Register
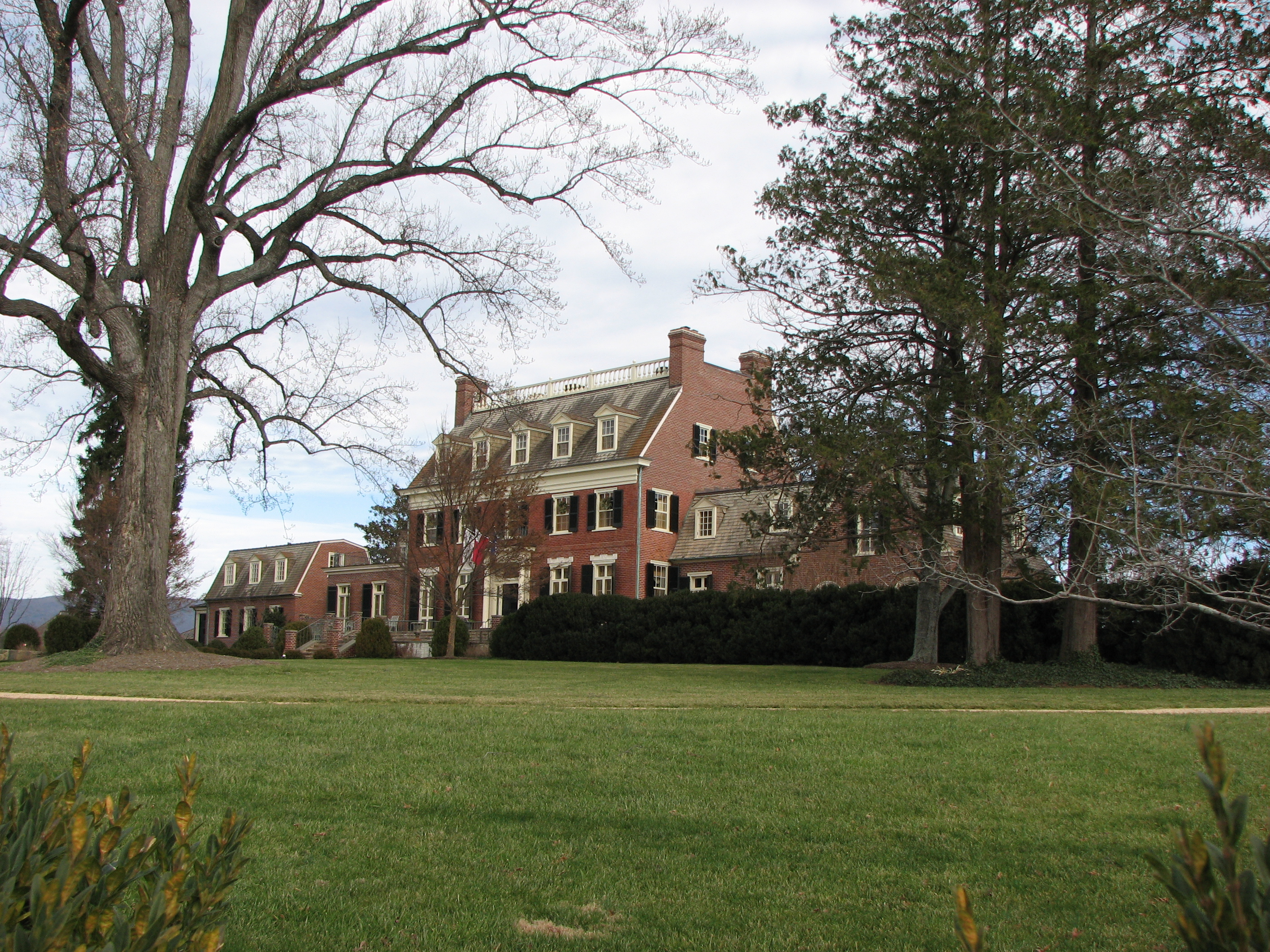
- Front of the farmhouse

- Location within Virginia Location within the United States
- Location: Junction of VA 691 and VA 692, near Greenwood, Virginia
- Coordinates: 38°2′28″N 78°44′20″W
- Area: 75 acres (30 ha)
- Built: 1923-1924
- Architect: Bottomley, William Lawrence; Gillette, Charles F.
- Architectural style: Colonial Revival, Georgian Revival
- NRHP reference No.: 90002163
- VLR No.: 002-0498

Significant dates
- Added to NRHP: January 25, 1991
- Designated VLR: February 20, 1990

Blue Ridge Farm, also known as Alton Park, is a historic estate located near Greenwood, Albemarle County, Virginia. The main residence consists of a 2 1/2-half-story, five-bay brick center section built in the mid-19th century, with two asymmetrical brick wings designed by William Lawrence Bottomley and added in 1923–1924. The center section has a steeply pitched gambrel roof with a balustraded deck and parapet ends. The exterior and nearly all of the interior appointments are executed in the Georgian Revival style. The gardens were designed by noted landscape architect Charles Gillette.

It was added to the National Register of Historic Places in 1991.
