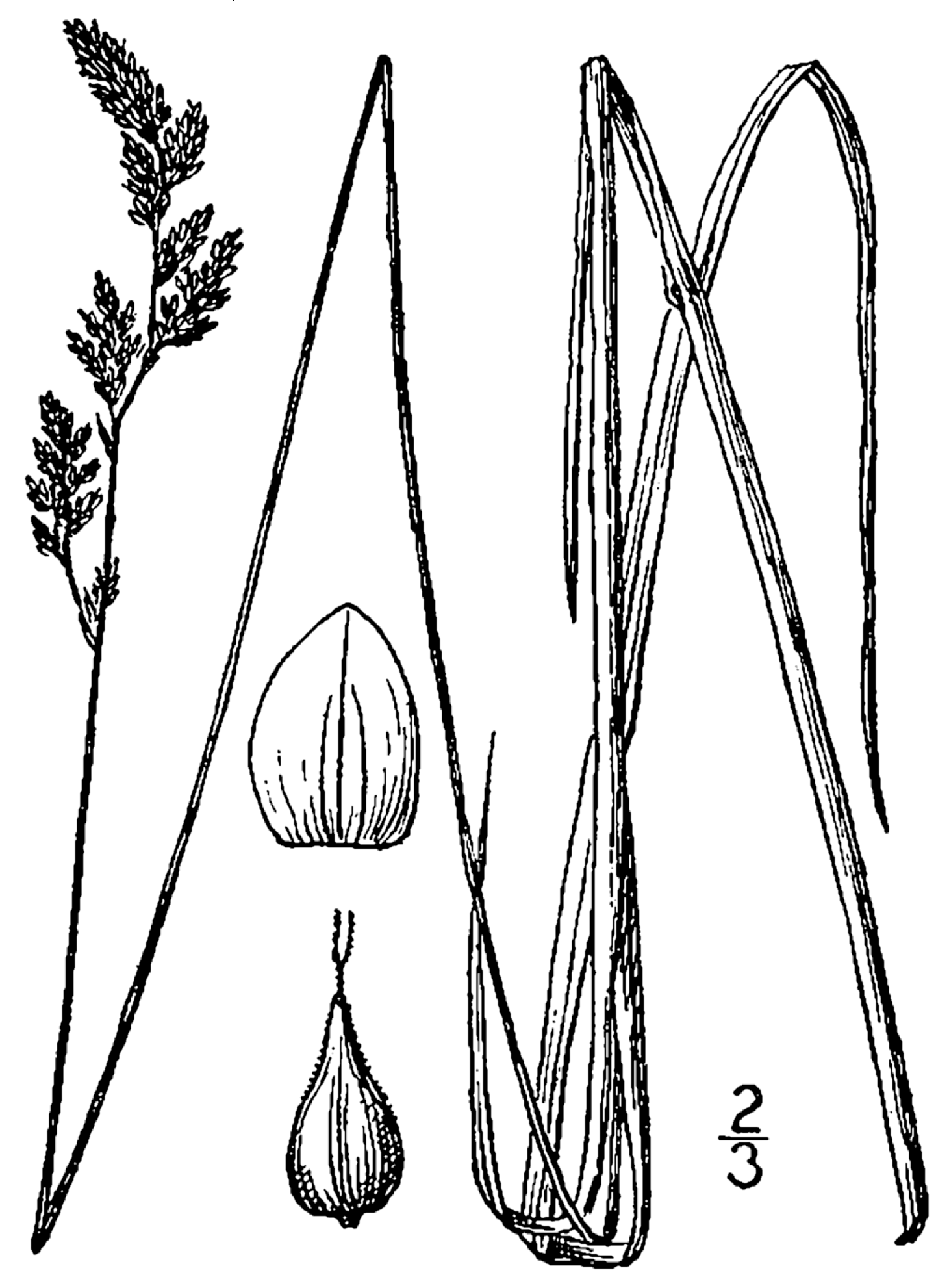
- 1913 botanical illustration.

Conservation status
- Least Concern (IUCN 3.1)

Scientific classification
- Kingdom: Plantae
- Clade: Tracheophytes
- Clade: Angiosperms
- Clade: Monocots
- Clade: Commelinids
- Order: Poales
- Family: Cyperaceae
- Genus: Carex
- Species: C. prairea

Binomial name
- Carex prairea Dewey ex Alph. Wood

= Carex prairea =

Species of grass-like plant

Carex prairea, common name prairie sedge, is a species of Carex native to North America. It is a perennial, tussock-forming plant in the Cyperaceae family

== Conservation status in the United States ==
It is listed as threatened in Maine and Pennsylvania, and as a special concern species in Connecticut,
