= Greenwood, Albemarle County, Virginia =

Unincorporated community in Virginia, United States

Greenwood
- Unincorporated community
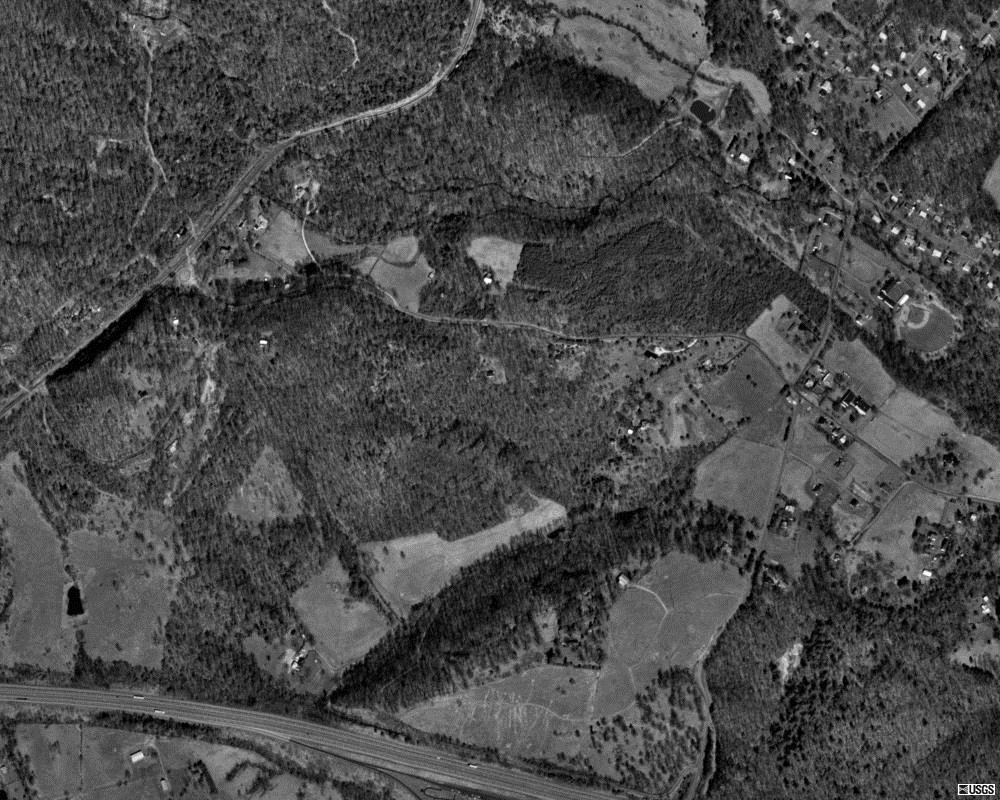
- Aerial photograph of the Greenwood area (1997)

- Location within the Commonwealth of Virginia Greenwood (the United States)
- Coordinates: 38°3′20.4″N 78°46′14″W
- Country: United States
- State: Virginia
- County: Albemarle
- Elevation: 1,066 ft (325 m)
- Time zone: UTC−5 (Eastern (EST))
  - Summer (DST): UTC−4 (EDT)
- GNIS feature ID: 1499502

Greenwood is an unincorporated community in Albemarle County, Virginia, United States. It is home to the Greenwood Country Store and the Greenwood Community Center, which has the area's only roller skating rink. Greenwood has a post office with ZIP code 22943 The Greenwood Tunnel, built by Claudius Crozet for the Blue Ridge Railroad and used by the Chesapeake and Ohio Railway until its abandonment during World War II, is near Greenwood by the Buckingham Branch Railroad tracks.

Emmanuel Church, Mirador, Seven Oaks Farm and Black's Tavern, The Cedars, Casa Maria, Blue Ridge Farm, Piedmont, Ramsay, and the Greenwood-Afton Rural Historic District are listed on the National Register of Historic Places.
