= Covesville, Virginia =

Unincorporated community in Virginia, United States

Covesville
- Unincorporated community
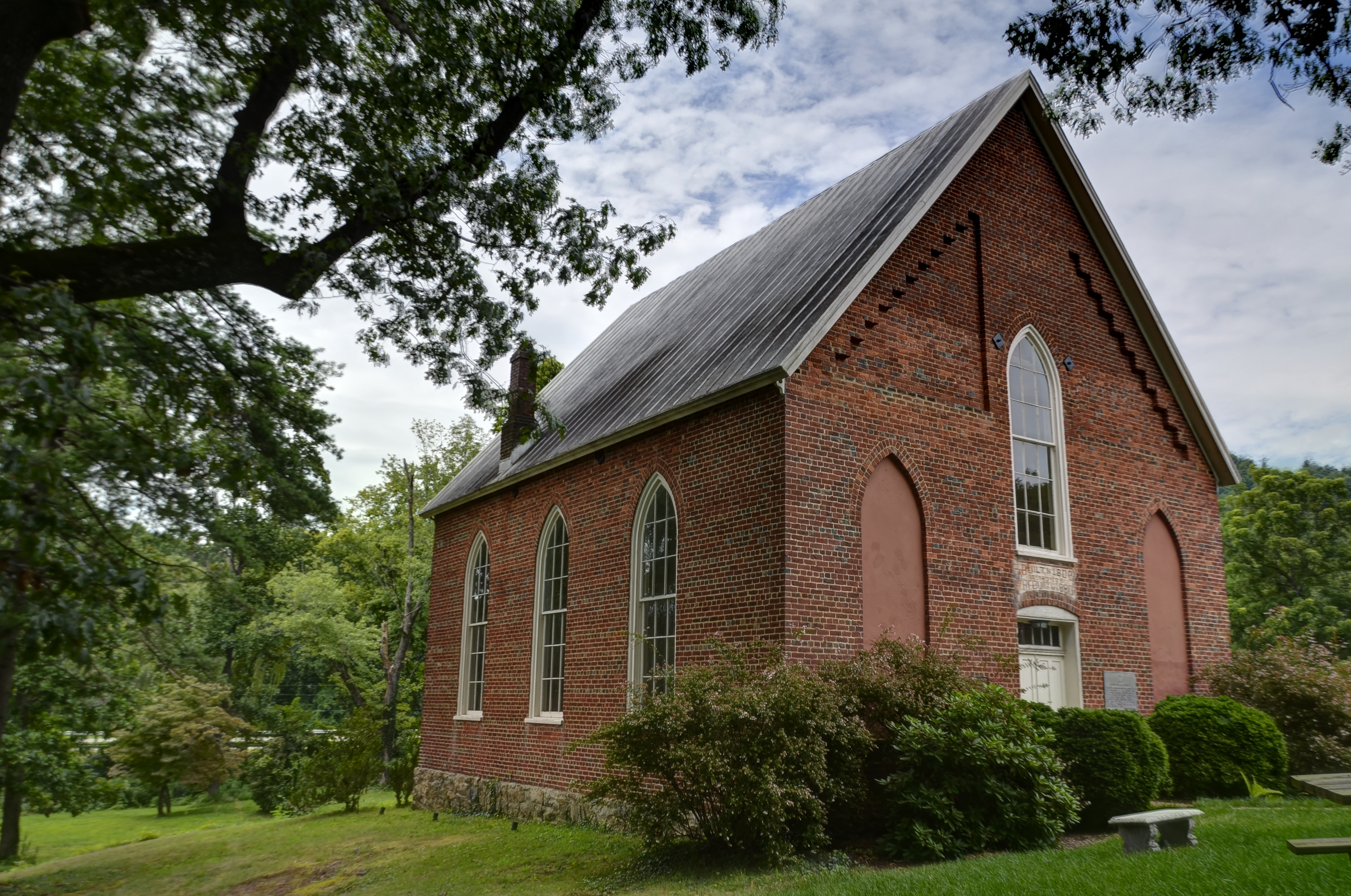
- Cove Presbyterian Church

- Location within the state of Virginia Covesville (the United States)
- Coordinates: 37°53′25″N 78°42′17″W
- Country: United States
- State: Virginia
- County: Albemarle
- Elevation: 784 ft (239 m)
- Time zone: UTC−5 (Eastern (EST))
  - Summer (DST): UTC−4 (EDT)
- ZIP codes: 22931
- Area code: 434
- GNIS feature ID: 1492813

Covesville is an unincorporated community in Albemarle County, Virginia, United States. Covesville is located 15.7 miles (25.3 km) southwest of Charlottesville and has a post office with ZIP code 22931.

The community is listed on the National Register of Historic Places as the Covesville Historic District. In addition, Cove Presbyterian Church, Redlands, and Edgemont are individually listed on the National Register in the community.

Covesville First Baptist Church is a historically Black Church in Covesville. On December 8, 1974, the church hosted Little Rev. Michael Dandridge in a benefit for the purchase of a communion table. This event was sponsored by Sister Marion Dowell.
