= Christians Creek =

Coordinates: 38°4′40.9″N 79°3′5.4″W

Location
- Country: United States

Physical characteristics
- Source
  - location: Virginia

Christians Creek is a 33.0-mile-long (53.1 km) stream in Augusta County in the U.S. state of Virginia. It is a tributary of the Middle River, part of the Shenandoah River system flowing to the Potomac River.

== See also ==
- List of rivers of Virginia
