= Crinkle crankle wall =

Wavy brick wall

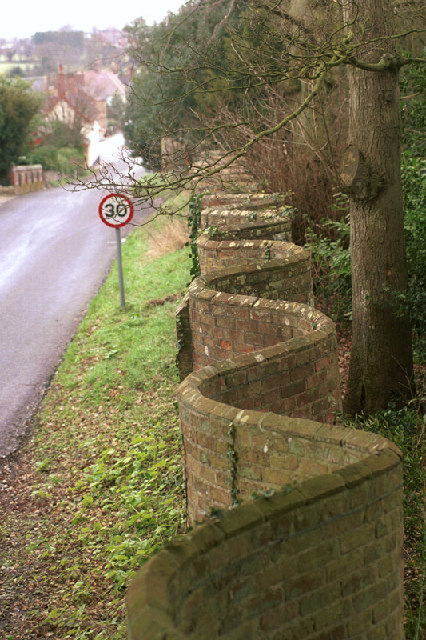
Crinkle crankle wall in Bramfield, Suffolk

A crinkle crankle wall, also known as a crinkum crankum, sinusoidal, serpentine, ribbon or wavy wall, is an unusual type of structural or garden wall built in a serpentine shape with alternating curves, originally used in Ancient Egypt, but also typically found in Suffolk in England.

The sinusoidal curves in the wall provide stability and help it to resist lateral forces, leading to greater strength than a straight wall of the same thickness of bricks without the need for buttresses.

The phrase "crinkle crankle" is an ablaut reduplication, defined as something with bends and turns, first attested in 1598 (though "crinkle" and "crankle" have somewhat longer histories).

== History ==
Sinusoidal walls featured extensively in the architecture of Egyptian city of Aten, thought to date from the period of Amenhotep III, some 3,400 years ago (1386–1353 BCE). Other examples exist at Tel el-Retaba and Thebes.

As a minor part of a larger system of fortification, such a wall may have been used to force oncoming troops to break ranks from closed to open ranks, and further expose them to defensive assault.

Many crinkle crankle walls are found in East Anglia, England, where the marshes of The Fens were drained by Dutch engineers starting in the mid-1600s. The construction of these walls has been attributed to these engineers, who called them slangenmuur (nl), meaning snake wall. The county of Suffolk claims at least 100 examples, twice as many as in the whole of the rest of the country. The crinkle crankle wall running from the former manor house to All Saints' Church in the estate village of Easton is believed to be the longest existing example in England.

The term "crinkle crankle" began to be applied to wavy walls in the 18th century, and is said to derive from a Suffolk dialect. At that time these garden walls were usually aligned east-west, so that one side faced south to catch the warming sun. They were used for growing fruit.

In Lymington, Hampshire, there are at least two examples of crinkle crankle walls. The older of the two is thought to have been constructed at the time of the Napoleonic Wars (1803–1815) by exiled Hanoverian soldiers living in the adjacent house.

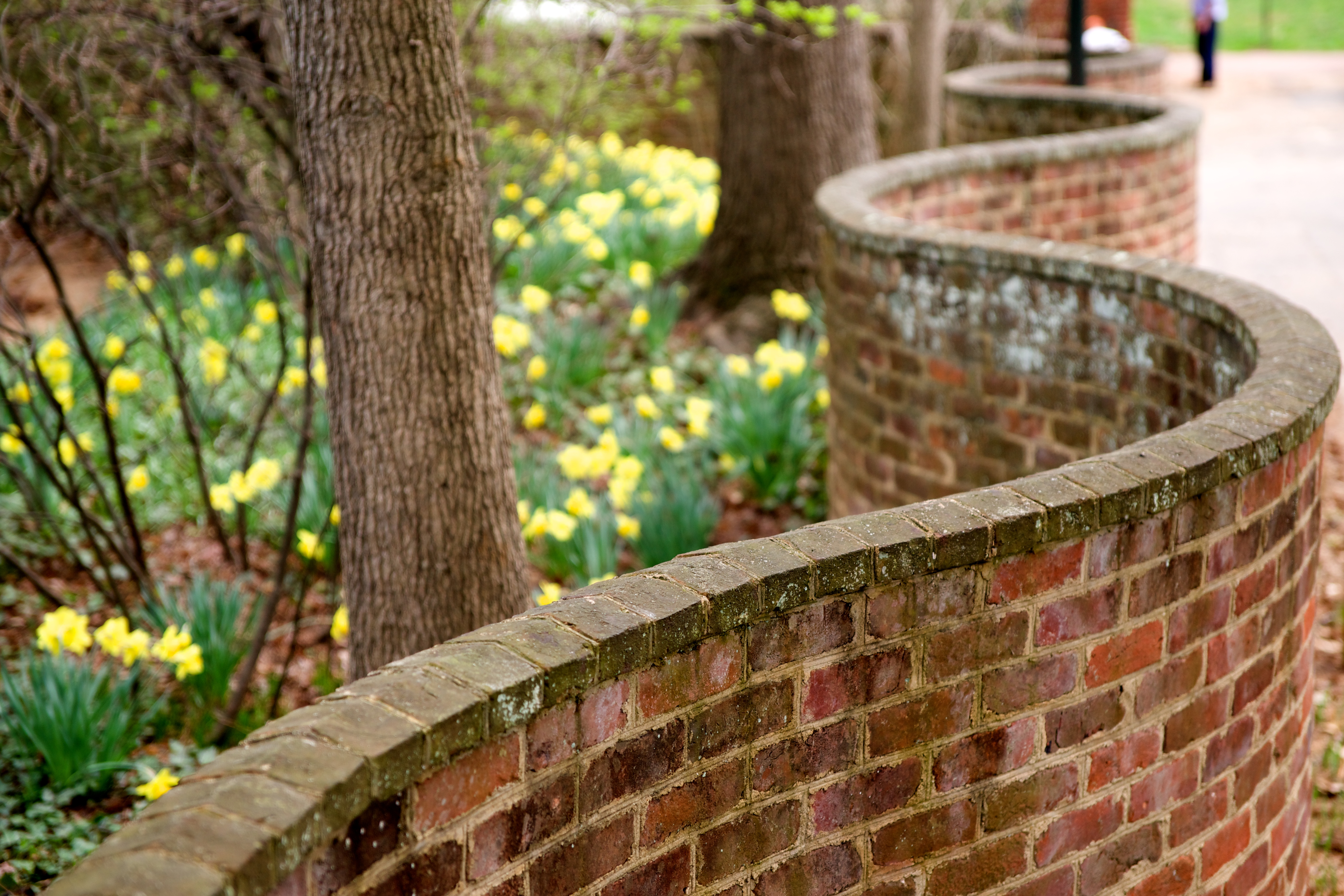
Serpentine wall at the University of Virginia

Thomas Jefferson (1743–1826) incorporated serpentine walls into the architecture of the University of Virginia, which he founded in 1819. Flanking both sides of its landmark rotunda and extending down the length of the lawn are ten pavilions, each with its own walled garden separated by crinkle crankle walls. Although some authorities claim that Jefferson invented this design, he was merely adapting a well-established English style of construction. A university document in his own hand shows how he calculated the savings and combined aesthetics with utility.

== Material saving ==
A typical free-standing brickwork wall is "one brick thick", but this is measured as one brick lengthways. Such a wall is built from two bricks side by side, intermittently bridged by headers, bricks laid crossways to the wall in order to tie the two rows of bricks together. Several different bonds are in use, the various patterns of alternating stretchers and headers. Small walls, such as cheap outbuildings and garden walls, may be built to half thickness by laying only a single row of stretchers, but this is a weak wall and prone to toppling, especially if tall or long. Garden walls that use it may require buttresses spaced out along its length.

A crinkle crankle wall offers material-saving advantages when compared to a straight wall. Typically it allows a half-thickness wall to be built, but without the risk of toppling. This is primarily due to its ability to maintain structural integrity while being thinner, especially against horizontal forces like wind. Crinkle crankle walls may be susceptible to damage from cars, though, or any substantial impact over a length between curves. An impact that might be restricted to the size of the impact in a conventional wall instead causes a long stretch of the crinkle crankle to topple.

The mathematical basis for this material efficiency involves the calculation of the wall's arc length. Modeled after a sine wave, the length of a crinkle crankle wall is given by the integral $\int_0^{2\pi} \sqrt{1 + a^2 \cos^2(x)}\, dx$, where $a$ is the amplitude of the sine wave. For $a = 1$, this integral results in approximately 7.6404, indicating that the crinkle crankle wall is about 22% longer than a straight wall ($2\pi \approx 6.2832$). As long as it is much thinner, it will save on material; typically, a crinkum crankum is only half a brick thick compared to a one brick thick straight wall, i.e. 50% as wide while 122% as long.

== Locations ==
Usually snake-shaped walls were built in orchards from east to west to retain heat from the sun, creating a suitable climate for fruit trees. A 120 m-long (390 ft) snake wall can be found at Zuylen Castle in Maarsen, the Netherlands, which was built during the transformation of the formal garden by Jan David Zocher in 1841. The church of San Carlo alle Quattro Fontane, Rome, Italy, designed by Francesco Borromini and built towards the end of his life in 1588–1593, has a sinuous façade.

At the Massachusetts Institute of Technology, the Baker House dormitory (1949) has a snake-like shape.

There are crinkle crankle walls in Virginia, including at the University of Virginia, the Cavalier Hotel in Virginia Beach and at Colonial Williamsburg.
