= John Lowell (disambiguation) =

John Lowell (1743–1802), also known as The Old Judge, was a U.S. Federal Judge appointed by George Washington

John Lowell is also the name of:

- John Lowell (minister) (1704–1767), early Massachusetts minister
- John Lowell Jr. (lawyer) (1769–1840), aka The Boston Rebel, Federalist lawyer and son of The Old Judge
- John Lowell Jr. (philanthropist) (1799–1836), son of Industrialist Francis Cabot Lowell and founder of the Lowell Institute
- John Amory Lowell (1798–1881), businessman and philanthropist
- John Lowell Gardner (1837–1898), American businessman, art collector, and philanthropist
- John Lowell (judge, 1865–1884) (1824–1897), Federal judge and son of John Amory Lowell
- John Lowell (actor) (1875–1937), American actor in Arizona Days
- John W. Lowell (born 1962), American playwright
- John Lowell (businessman), son of Ralph Lowell, trustee of the Lowell Institute
- John Lowell (quarterback), of the 2008 Boston College Eagles football team

== See also ==
- Lowell family, one of the Boston Brahmin families of New England
