= John Lowell Jr. (lawyer) =

American lawyer (1769–1840)

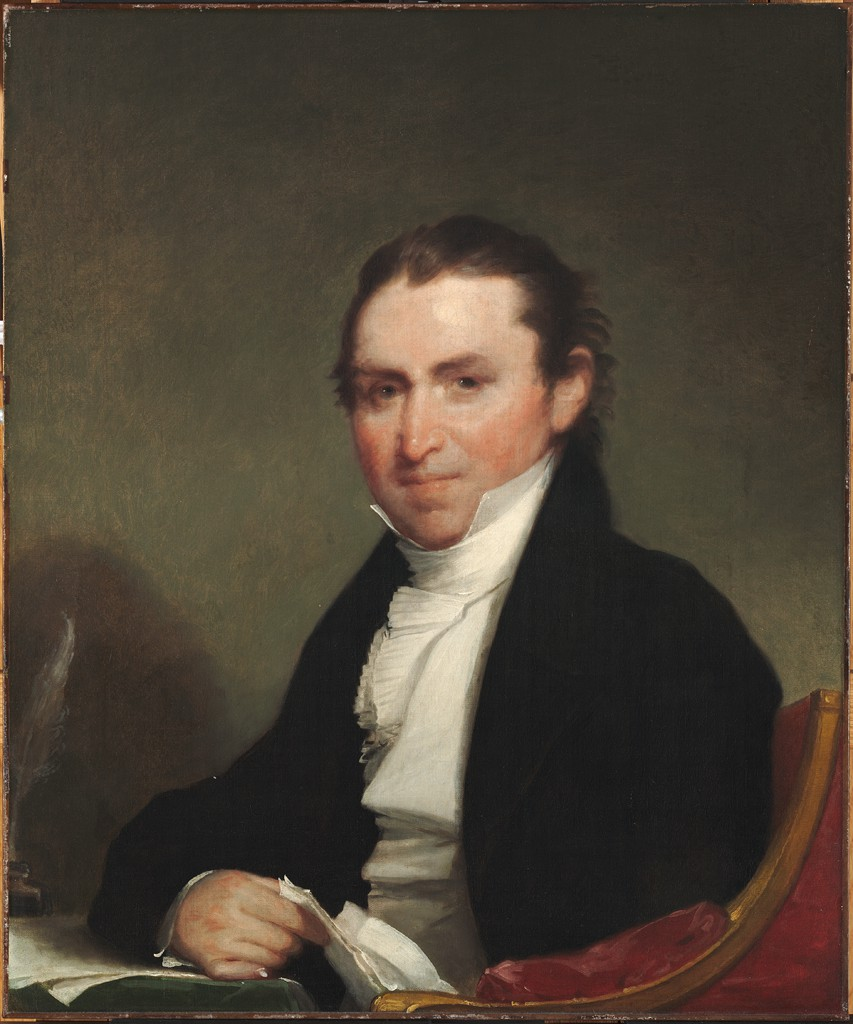
- John Lowell Jr., 1769–1840
- Born: October 6, 1769; Newburyport, Essex County, Massachusetts
- Died: March 12, 1840 (aged 70); Boston
- Occupation: Lawyer
- Spouse: Rebecca Amory

John Lowell Jr. (October 6, 1769 – March 12, 1840) was an American lawyer and influential member of the Federalist Party in the early days of the United States of America.

== Career ==
Coat of Arms of John Lowell Jr.

John Lowell Jr. was the son of John Lowell (1743–1802). He graduated from Phillips Andover and then from Harvard University in 1786. After studying law, he was admitted to the bar in 1789 (like his father, before he was twenty years old). In 1797, he gave the Fourth of July Address at Faneuil Hall in Boston, in which he criticized revolutionary France. From 1798-1801, he served as a Federalist member of the Massachusetts legislature. In 1801, along with Harrison Gray Otis, he defended Jason Fairbanks against charges of murdering Elizabeth Fales in Dedham, Massachusetts. Despite a vigorous defense, Fairbanks was convicted and executed by hanging. This, followed by the death of his father in 1802, caused him to suffer a breakdown. He retired from active law practice in 1803, and traveled with his family to Europe for the next three years, touring England, France, and Italy.

After his return to the United States in 1806, he took up residence at his father's old estate in the Jamaica Plain neighborhood of Roxbury, Massachusetts, and devoted himself to literature, writing on politics, agriculture, theology, and other topics, under various signatures, such as: "Citizen of Massachusetts", "Massachusetts Lawyer", "Layman", and "Yankee Farmer". He vigorously opposed French influence and the policies of the Democratic-Republican Party, writing many spirited pamphlets (some signed "The Boston Rebel", some "The Roxbury Farmer"), including: The Antigallican (1797), Remarks on the Hon. J. Q. Adams's Review of Mr Ames's Works (1809), New England Patriot, being a Candid Comparison of the Principles and Conduct of the Washington and Jefferson Administrations (1810), Appeals to the People on the Causes and Consequences of War with Great Britain (1811) and Mr Madison's War (1812). The pamphlets contained an extreme statement of the anti-war wing of the Federalist party and defended British impressment as a right of long standing. Lowell is believed to be the first to use the term "Mr. Madison's War" as a derogatory nickname for the War of 1812. In his 1814 work, Thoughts in a Series of Letters, in Answer to a Question Respecting the Division of the States, Lowell advocated that all states admitted after the original thirteen be expelled from the Union.

After the war Lowell abandoned politics, and won for himself the title of "the Columella of New England" by his interest in agriculture — he was for many years president of the Massachusetts Agricultural Society. He was elected a Fellow of the American Academy of Arts and Sciences in 1804. From 1810 until 1828, he was a member of the corporation of Harvard, which gave him the degree of LL.D. in 1814. In this role, he was a driving force behind the establishment of Harvard Law School, although he declined an offer to serve as the school's first professor of law. He was a benefactor of the Boston Athenaeum, serving at various times as President and Vice President, as well as the Massachusetts General Hospital. In 1839, he traveled to the Caribbean in an attempt to recover his failing health. After his return, he died suddenly on March 12, 1840, at his townhouse in Boston on Tremont Street. His funeral sermon was delivered by the Rev. Francis W. P. Greenwood.

Edward Everett said of him: "He possessed colloquial powers of the highest order and a flow of unstudied eloquence never surpassed, and rarely, as with him, united with the command of an accurate, elegant, and logical pen".

== Works ==
Among his political pamphlets, of which he published about twenty-five, are:

- "Peace without Dishonor — War without Hope, an Inquiry into the Subject of the 'Chesapeake' " (Boston, 1807)
- "Candid Comparison of the Washington and Jefferson Administrations" (1810)
- "Diplomatick Policy of Mr. Madison Unveiled" (1810)
- "Mr. Madison's War; a Dispassionate Inquiry into the Reasons alleged by Madison for declaring an Offensive and Ruinous War against Great Britain" (1812)

His theological writings include "Are you a Christian or a Calvinist?" (1815).

== Family ==
John Lowell Jr. was one of many notable members of the Lowell family. His brother, Francis Cabot Lowell was the founder of U.S. cotton manufacturing. Lowell's other brother, Charles Lowell, was for many years the minister at the West End Church in Boston, and was the father of the famed poet and diplomat James Russell Lowell.

In 1793, Lowell married Rebecca Amory, the daughter of merchant Jonathan Amory and the Boston diarist Katharine Greene Amory. His son John Amory Lowell (1798-1881) was one of the leading industrialists of New England in the nineteenth century, and like his father played a prominent role in the development of Harvard during forty years as a member of the corporation.

Lowell's two grandsons also reached prominence. John Lowell (1824-1897) was a federal judge, and Augustus Lowell (1830-1900) followed his father into the textile industry, making a fortune. Lowell's great-grandchildren, too, were notable in numerous ways: Percival Lowell (1855-1916) was a leading astronomer; A. Lawrence Lowell (1856-1943) served as President of Harvard; James A. Lowell (1869-1933) was a federal judge; and Amy Lowell (1874-1925) was a Pulitzer Prize winning poet.

== See also ==
- Lowell family
- First Families of Boston
