= Francis Cabot Lowell (disambiguation) =

Francis Cabot Lowell may refer to:

- Francis Cabot Lowell (1775–1817), businessman and co-founder of Lowell, Massachusetts
  - Francis Cabot Lowell, Jr. (1803–1874), industrialist (his son)
    - Francis Cabot Lowell (judge) (1855–1911), United States federal judge and Massachusetts politician (his grandson)
