= List of trustees of the Lowell Institute =

The Lowell Institute (est. 1836) is an educational foundation in Boston, Massachusetts, United States, providing for free public lectures, and endowed by the bequest of $237,000 left by John Lowell, Jr., who died in 1836. The Institute had an unusual mode of governance: a single trustee who was empowered to appoint his successor and who was, in the language of Lowell's will, "always choose in preference to all others some male descendant of my grandfather, John Lowell, provided there be one who is competent to hold the office of trustee, and of the name of Lowell".

Having been extremely successful for more than a century, audiences for Lowell Institute began to wane, and the newly appointed Trustee, Ralph Lowell, in co-operation with Harvard President James B. Conant founded the public radio station WGBH Boston in hopes of reaching larger audiences. WGBH Boston evolved under Ralph Lowell's, and Lowell's son John's, direction to become what it is today.

== Trustees ==
1. John Lowell, Jr., (1814–1836)
2. John Amory Lowell, (1836–1881)
3. Augustus Lowell, (1881–1900)
4. A. Lawrence Lowell, (1900–1943)
5. Ralph Lowell, (1943–1978)
6. John Lowell (businessman), (1978–2011)
7. William A. Lowell (attorney and Practice Group Leader with Choate Hall & Stewart LLP) (2011-)

== Portrait gallery ==
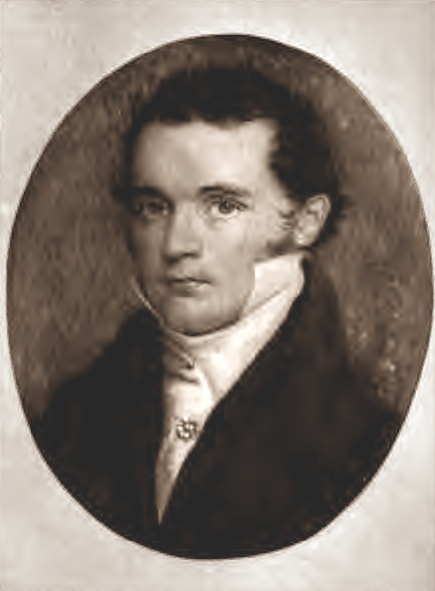
John Lowell, Jr.
1799–1836

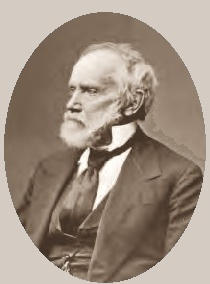
John Amory Lowell
1798–1881

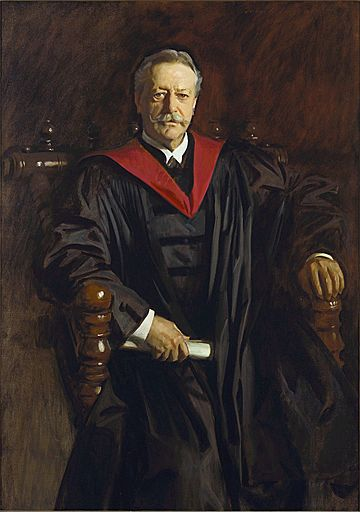
A. Lawrence Lowell
1856–1943

== See also ==
- Lowell Institute
- Lowell family
