= John Amory Lowell =

American businessman (1798–1881)

John Lowell
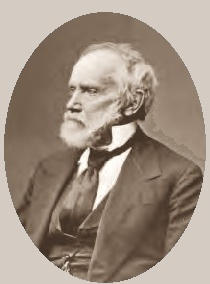
- Born: November 11, 1798
- Died: October 31, 1881 (aged 82)
- Occupations: Businessman and philanthropist
- Relatives: Lowell family

John Amory Lowell (November 11, 1798 – October 31, 1881) was an American businessman and philanthropist from Boston. He became the sole trustee of the Lowell Institute when his first cousin, John Lowell Jr. (1799–1836), the Institute's endower, died. (Lowell 1899, pp 117–118)

== Family ==
John Amory, the second child of John Lowell Jr (1769–1840) and Rebecca Amory (1771–1842), was among the first generation of Lowells to be born in Boston, and the fifth generation to be born in America. His father maintained a well-established law firm in the city, and three years after John Amory's birth, retired for reasons of his failing health. After retiring in 1801, the elder Lowell spent much of his time and wealth patronizing the burgeoning horticultural society in Boston, so much so that he became known to his friends and family as "The Norfolk Farmer." John Amory Lowell's paternal grandfather, also named John Lowell (1743–1802) but referred to as "The Old Judge," was a federal judge appointed by President George Washington and is considered to be the founding father of the Boston Lowells. (Greenslet 1946)

Like his father and grandfathers before him, Lowell was the fourth member in his family line to graduate from Harvard College in 1815, at the age of 17.

After spending an extended time traveling through Europe and then establishing himself as a successful merchant in Boston, Lowell married his first wife, Susan Cabot Lowell (1801–1827), a daughter of his uncle, Francis Cabot Lowell. Together, they had two children, Susan Cabot and John. Lowell's wife died during childbirth in 1827. Their son, John Lowell, was appointed to the United States District Court for the District of Massachusetts in 1865 by President Abraham Lincoln, and in 1878, appointed to the United States circuit court by President Rutherford B. Hayes. John Amory's grandson, James Arnold Lowell, also went on to become a federal judge, sitting for the District of Massachusetts. Lowell's wife, Susan Cabot, who was a great-granddaughter of Edward and Dorthy (Quincy) Jackson, connected their children and their descendants to those of the Holmeses of Boston, a family that includes poet Dr. Oliver Wendell Holmes Sr., and United States Supreme Court justice and Civil War hero, Oliver Wendell Holmes Jr.

With his second wife, Elizabeth Cabot Putnam (1807–1881), Amory fathered a son and three daughters, Augustus, Elizabeth Rebecca, Ellen Bancroft, and Sara Putnam. Augustus Lowell became a businessman and eventually succeeded Lowell as the second trustee of the Lowell Institute. John Amory's grandchildren, through Elizabeth Cabot, included author and astronomer Percival Lowell, Harvard President Abbott Lawrence Lowell, and poet Amy Lowell.

Merrimack Manufacturing Co., Lowell, Massachusetts

== Career ==
In 1835 and 1838, John Amory became the first treasurer for both Merrimack Manufacturing Company and Boott Cotton Mill, textile mills in Lowell, Massachusetts. And in 1857, he became director of The Winnipiseogee Lake Cotton and Woolen Manufacturing Company. This were all positions that his son, Augustus, succeeded to within the same companies. (Bay State Monthly 1884)

Lowell was a Fellow of Harvard College (1837–1877), a Fellow of the American Academy of Arts and Sciences, and a member of the Linnean Society of London. Later, in 1851, Harvard honored John Amory with an LLD.

=== Lowell Institute ===
Coat of Arms of John Amory Lowell

The trust—or Lowell Institute, had an unusual mode of governance: a single trustee who was empowered to appoint his successor and who was, in the language of John Lowell Jr.'s will, to "always choose in preference to all others some male descendant of my grandfather, John Lowell, provided there be one who is competent to hold the office of trustee, and of the name of Lowell." (Everett 1840)

Under John Amory, its first trustee, the Institute flourished. The list of Lowell Lecturers during his tenure included science, literature, politics, economics, philosophy, and theology, including Britain's most celebrated geologist, Sir Charles Lyell, Swiss naturalist Louis Agassiz, and novelists Charles Dickens and William Makepeace Thackeray.

The lectures were so immensely popular that crowds crushed the windows of the Old Corner Bookstore where the tickets were distributed and certain series had to be repeated by popular demand. John Amory tirelessly led the Lowell Institute for more than 40 years before naming his son, Augustus, as his replacement.

== See also ==
- Lowell family
- First Families of Boston
- Lowell Institute
- Lowell, Massachusetts
- Kirk Boott

Preceded by John Lowell Jr.	Trustee of Lowell Institute; 1836–1881	Succeeded by Augustus Lowell
