= Delmar R. Lowell =

American historian (1844–1912)

Reverend Delmar R. Lowell
- Born: Delmar Rial Lowell; November 29, 1844; South Valley, New York, U.S.
- Died: 1912 (aged 67–68)
- Education: Cazenovia Seminary; Wesleyan University
- Occupations: Minister; historian; genealogist
- Known for: The Historic Genealogy of the Lowells of America from 1639 to 1899
- Family: Lowell family
- Military career
- Allegiance: United States
- Conflicts: American Civil War; Battle of Sailor's Creek (WIA)

Delmar Rial Lowell (November 29, 1844 – 1912) was a minister, Civil War veteran, American historian, and genealogist.

== Early life ==
Lowell was born on November 29, 1844, in South Valley, New York, to Reuben and Catherine Seeber Lowell. He used the spelling "Delmer" for a few years as a teenager before reverting to the original spelling. Delmar graduated from Cazenovia Seminary and Wesleyan University. He fought in the Civil War and was wounded in the Battle of Sailor's Creek. His right arm was amputated at the shoulder as a result of his wounds.

== Lowell genealogy ==
Taking over 10 years of research by his cousin, Amos Lowell, Delmar spent nearly 15 more years researching and documenting the history of the Lowell family in America, starting with the founding patriarch in America, Percival Lowle (1571—1664). Delmar's effort culminated in the 2 volume publication The Historic Genealogy of the Lowells of America from 1639 to 1899.

In the preface, Lowell notes that another descendant, Judge James H. Lowell, (Vol 1, p. 197) a native of Boston who eventually settled in Holton, Kansas (1842–1925), wrote the transatlantic history of the family contained in the genealogy, from Percival's emigration from England backward for nine generations: "We call special attention to this chapter as a most valuable part of this work." The chapter James Howard Lowell wrote is Chapter III, entitled "Transatlantic Ancestry of the American Lowells," pp. xxxiv-xlix. James Howard Lowell also contributed significantly to research on coats of arms.

After more than two decades, Lowell documented the births, birthplaces, marriages, remarriages, children, and the deaths of Lowells all over the United States from 1639 to 1899. His 2-volume book runs to 826 pages and covers thousands of his kinsmen, living and dead. The contents of several early wills, including John, Richard, and Percival's, are included in his publication. Lowell also went to great lengths in researching the family Coat of Arms and the evolution of his surname.

Lowell's work, coupled with Ferris Greenslet's biography, The Lowells and Their Seven Worlds, is considered two of the primary resources for most modern researchers looking into the Lowell family history. Much of Lowell's research on Percival Lowle's ancestry can be found today copied in the online genealogies of hundreds of families who have traced their own American heritage to founding the Lowell's.

== Death ==
Lowell died in 1912.

== See also ==
- Lowell family
