= Elizabeth Lowell Putnam =

American philanthropist

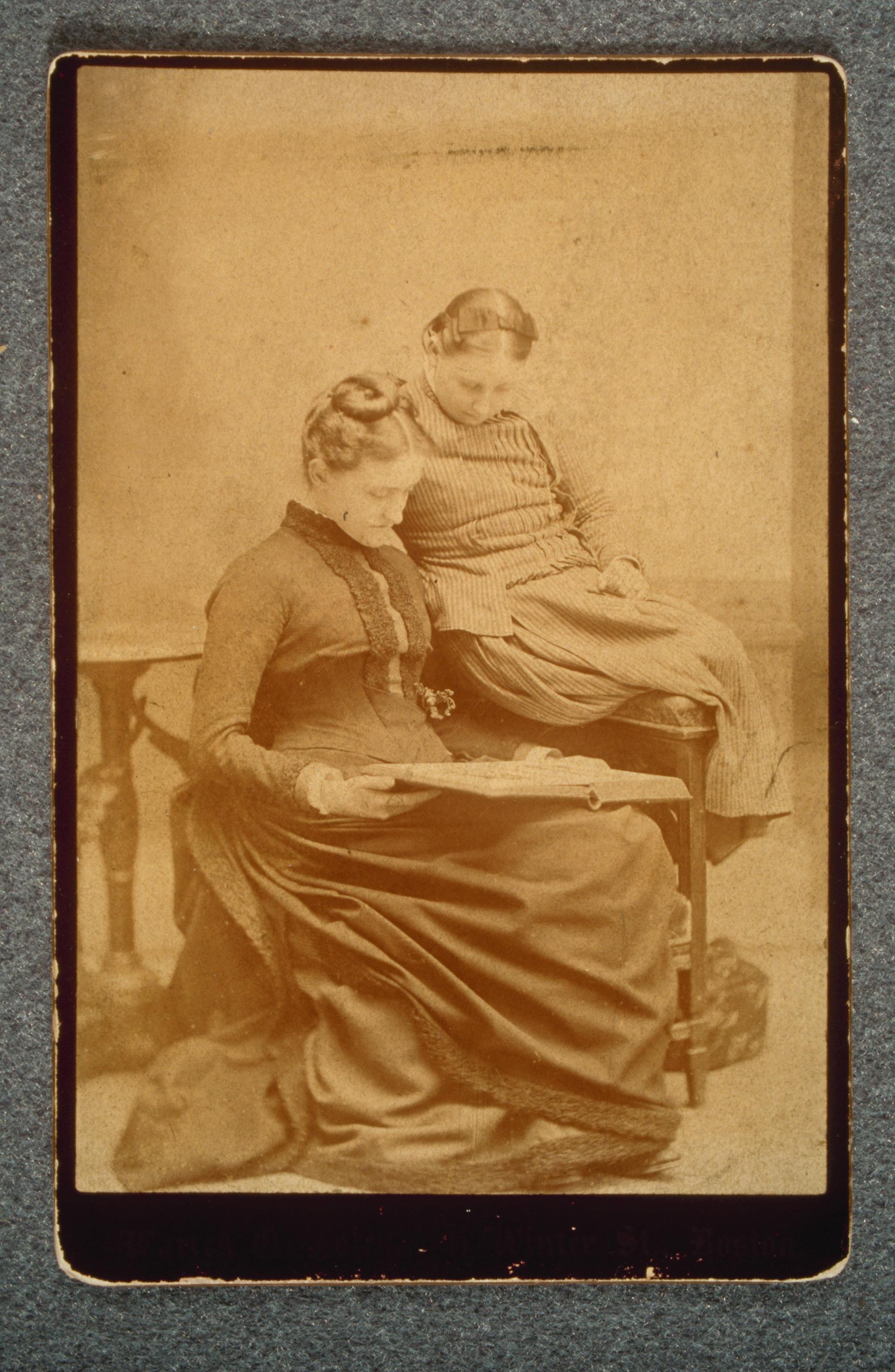
Elizabeth Lowell Putnam, reading with Amy

Elizabeth Lowell Putnam (2 February 1862–1935) was an American philanthropist and an activist for prenatal care. She was born (as Bessie Lowell) in Boston, Massachusetts, the daughter of Augustus Lowell and Katherine Bigelow Lowell.

== Family ==
A member of the Brahmin Lowell family, her siblings included the astronomer Percival Lowell, the educator and legal scholar Abbott Lawrence Lowell, and the poet Amy Lowell. They were the great-grandchildren of John Lowell and, on their mother's side, the grandchildren of Abbott Lawrence.

== Early life and marriage ==
Elizabeth grew up on her family's 10-acre (40,000 m^{2}) estate, which was later called Sevenels for the seven Lowells that comprised her family. In 1888, Elizabeth married her third cousin and family lawyer William Putnam, Senior.

== William Lowell Putnam Mathematical Competition ==
In 1924, after her husband's death, Elizabeth Lowell Putnam established the William Lowell Putnam Intercollegiate Memorial Fund in order to begin a college-level mathematics competition. This contest, which continues to this day, began in 1935 under the direction of the Mathematical Association of America. Since 1992, the competition has awarded the Elizabeth Lowell Putnam Prize for outstanding performance by a female contestant.

== Descendants ==
She was the maternal grandmother of McGeorge Bundy and William Putnam Bundy.
