= Augustus Lowell =

American industrialist, philanthropist, horticulturist, and civic leader (1830–1900)

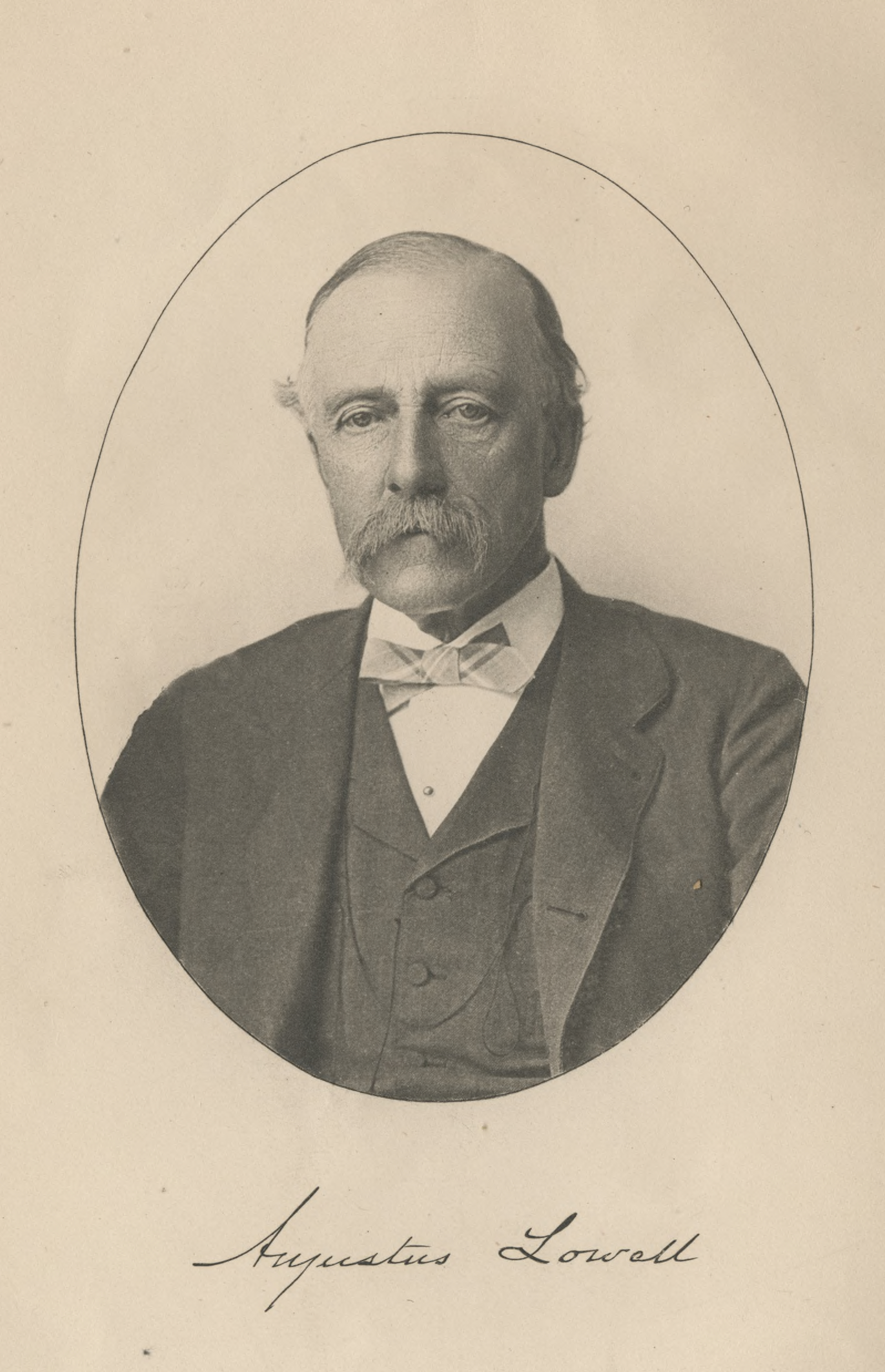
- Lowell
- Born: January 15, 1830; Boston, Massachusetts, U.S.
- Died: June 22, 1900 (aged 70)
- Education: Harvard College
- Occupations: Industrialist; philanthropist; horticulturist; civic leader
- Spouse: Katherine Bigelow Lawrence (m. 1854; died 1895)
- Children: 7, including Percival, Abbott, Elizabeth, and Amy
- Father: John Amory Lowell
- Family: Lowell family

Augustus Lowell (January 15, 1830 – June 22, 1900) was a wealthy Massachusetts industrialist, philanthropist, horticulturist, and civic leader.

== Early life and education ==
Lowell was born on January 15, 1830, in Boston. A member of the Brahmin Lowell family, he was born in Boston to John Amory Lowell and his second wife, Elizabeth Cabot Putnam. His great-grandfather, John Lowell, was among the first Judges for the newly created federal courts, appointed by Presidents George Washington and John Adams.

Augustus' elder brother, Judge John Lowell, would be appointed to hold the same seats held by their great-grandfather, by Presidents Abraham Lincoln and Rutherford B. Hayes.

He was among the fifth generation in his family to graduate from Harvard College, class of 1850.

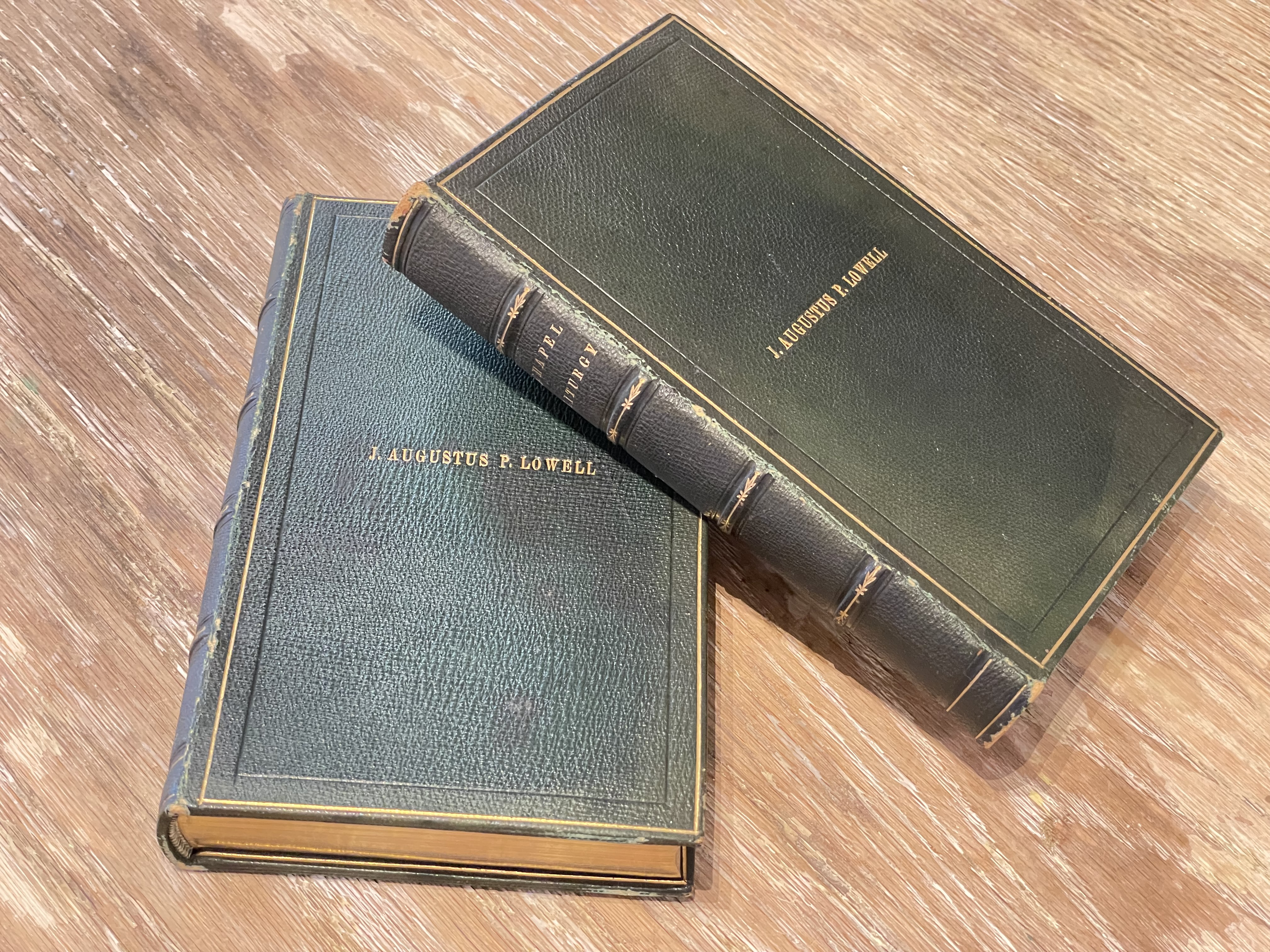
Lowell's copy of the King's Chapel Book of Common Prayer

Lowell's coat of arms

== Career ==
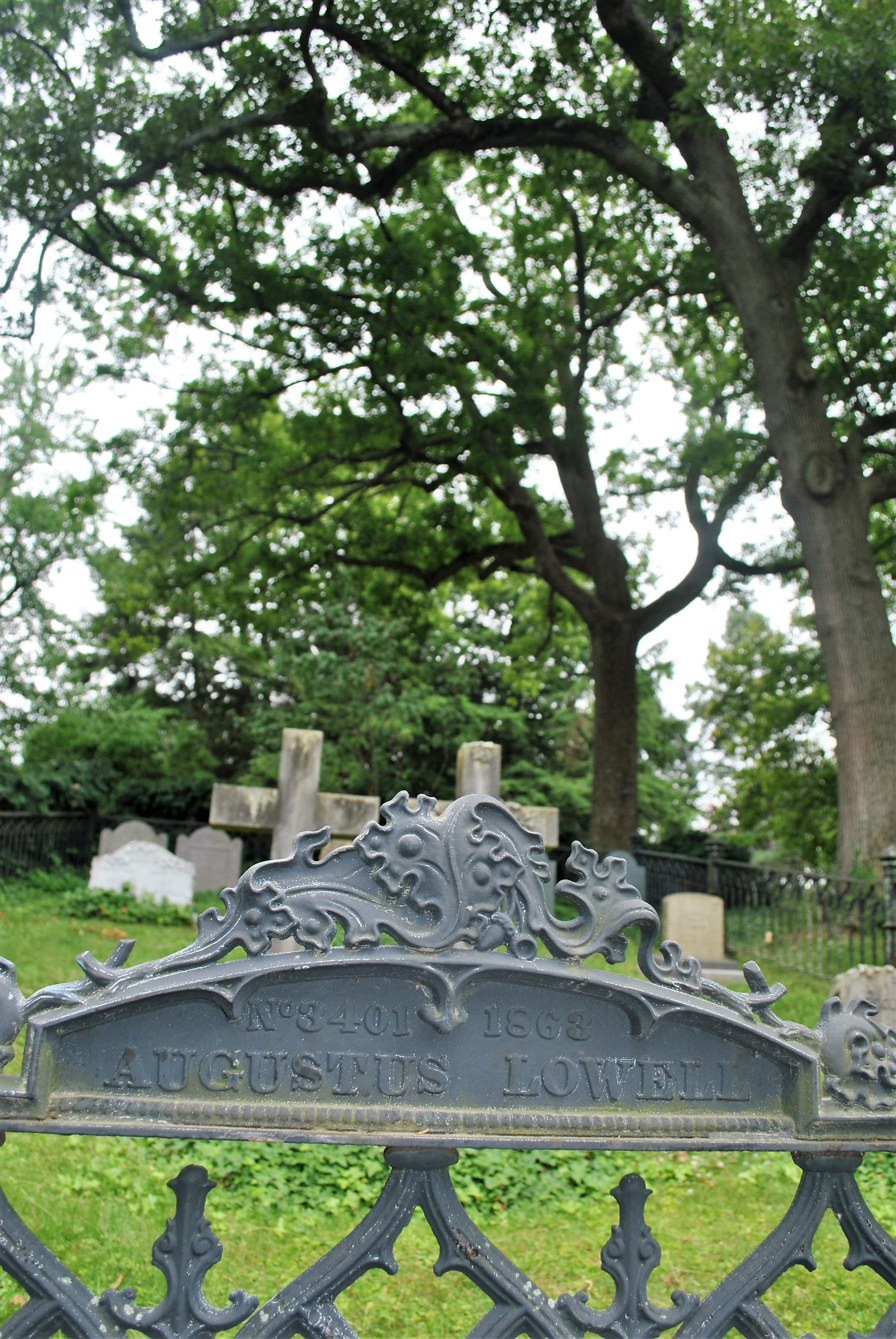
Mount Auburn Cemetery, Augustus Lowell gravesite

Augustus was Treasurer of the Merrimack Manufacturing Company, a textile mill in Lowell, Massachusetts, for much of his early career. In 1875, he became Treasurer of the Boott Cotton Mills, also in Lowell. And in 1883, he was Director of The Winnipiseogee Lake Cotton and Woolen Manufacturing Company. All were positions his father, John Amory, had once held within the same companies. He was also, as of 1878, a director of the Pacific Mills in Lawrence, Massachusetts, the largest textile combine of its time.

Lowell was also a member of the Corporation of the Massachusetts Institute of Technology and Vice President of the American Academy of Arts and Sciences. In 1881, upon his father's death, Augustus was appointed sole Trustee of the Lowell Institute, a position he would hold for the last 20 years of his life.

== Personal life ==
On June 1, 1854, he married Katherine Bigelow Lawrence (February 21, 1832 – April 1, 1895), the daughter of Hon. Abbott Lawrence. Both Augustus and Katherine were able to trace their ancestry back to the earliest colonial settlers and founders of New England in the mid-17th century, and even further to notable English families of the 12th and 13th centuries. Augustus and Katherine Lowell had seven children and thus named their 10-acre (40,000 m^{2}), Brookline, Massachusetts, estate, Sevenels.

The Lowells lost two of their children during infancy, but their surviving children went on to great public prominence.

- Eldest son Percival Lowell wrote several books on the Far East and on the planet Mars, and founded the Lowell Observatory in Flagstaff, Arizona.
- Their second son, Abbott Lawrence Lowell, succeeded Augustus as Trustee at the Lowell Institute in 1900, and became President of Harvard College in 1909, serving in that capacity until 1933.
- One of their daughters, Katharine Lowell, married (1) (James) Alfred Roosevelt, of the Long Island clan, and (2) T. James Bowlker, a Boston cotton mill owner.
- Another daughter, Elizabeth Lowell Putnam, was a prominent activist for prenatal care.
- And their youngest daughter, Amy Lowell, 20 years younger than her brothers, would become the second celebrated poet in the Lowell family.

== Death ==
He died on June 22, 1900 in Brookline, Massachusetts.

== See also ==
- Lowell family
- First Families of Boston
- Lowell Institute
- Lowell, Massachusetts

Preceded by John Amory Lowell	Trustee of Lowell Institute; 1881–1900	Succeeded by A. Lawrence Lowell
