= Lowell Holly Reservation =

Nature reserve in Massachusetts, United States

Coordinates: 41.6677°N 70.4764°W

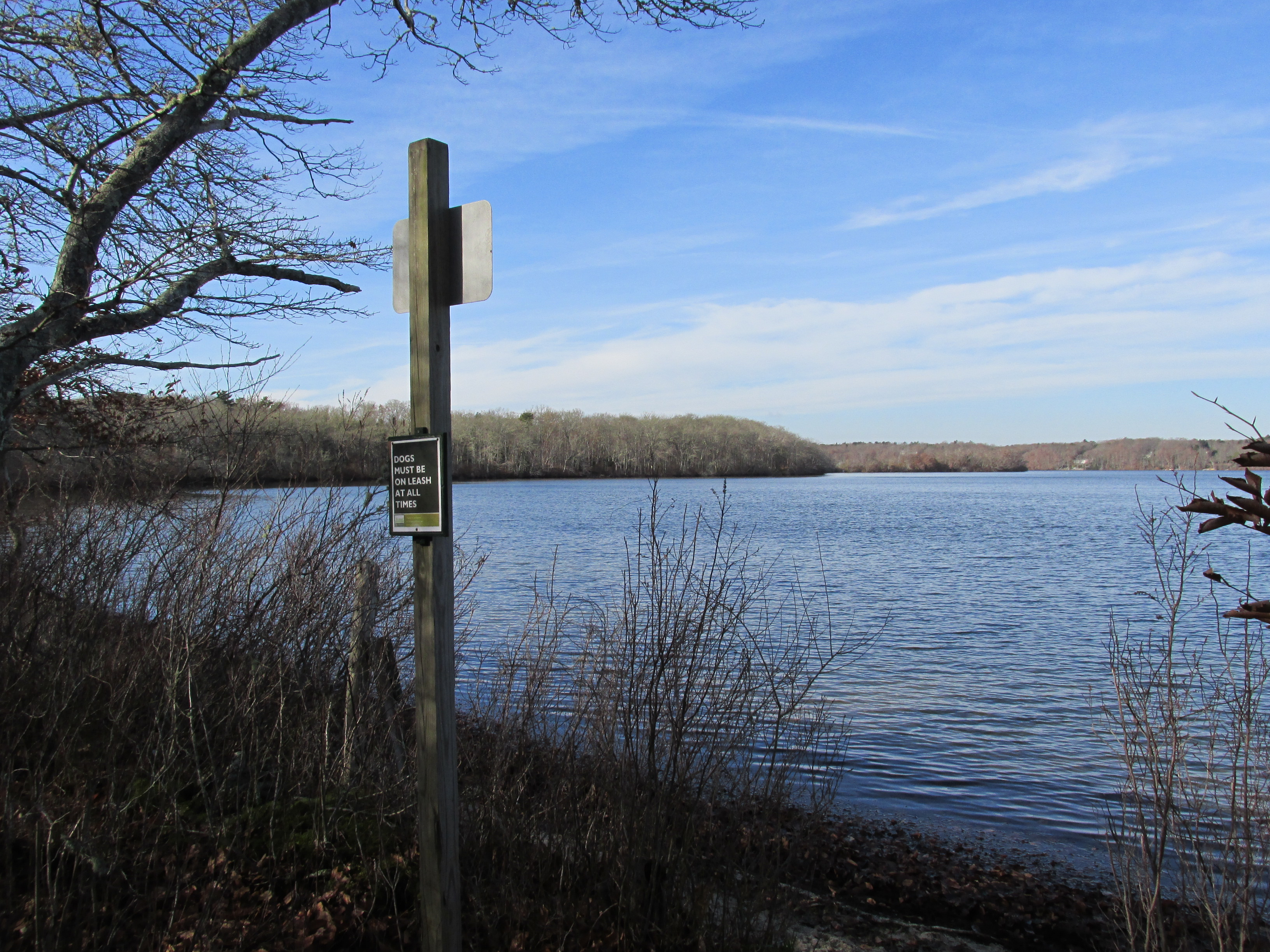
Conaumet Cove, Lowell Holly Reservation

The Lowell Holly Reservation is a 135-acre (0.55 km^{2}) nature reserve in Mashpee and Sandwich, Massachusetts and is managed by the Trustees of Reservations. The area was extensively planted by A. Lawrence Lowell and Wilfred Wheeler with rhododendrons, mountain laurel and holly trees, for which the reservation gets its name. There are 4 miles (6.4 km) of hiking trails and two peninsular knolls that jut into Mashpee Pond and Wakeby Pond. Lowell bequeathed the property to the Trustees of Reservations in 1943.
