= James Lowell =

James Lowell may refer to:

- James Arnold Lowell (1869–1933), United States federal judge
- James Russell Lowell (1819–1891), American poet and diplomat
- James A. Lowell (1849–1900), Canadian Member of Parliament
- James Lowell (politician) (1867–1914), Canadian politician in the Legislative Assembly of New Brunswick
- James Lowell (As the World Turns), fictional character
