= Lowell family =

American Boston Brahmin family

Lowell

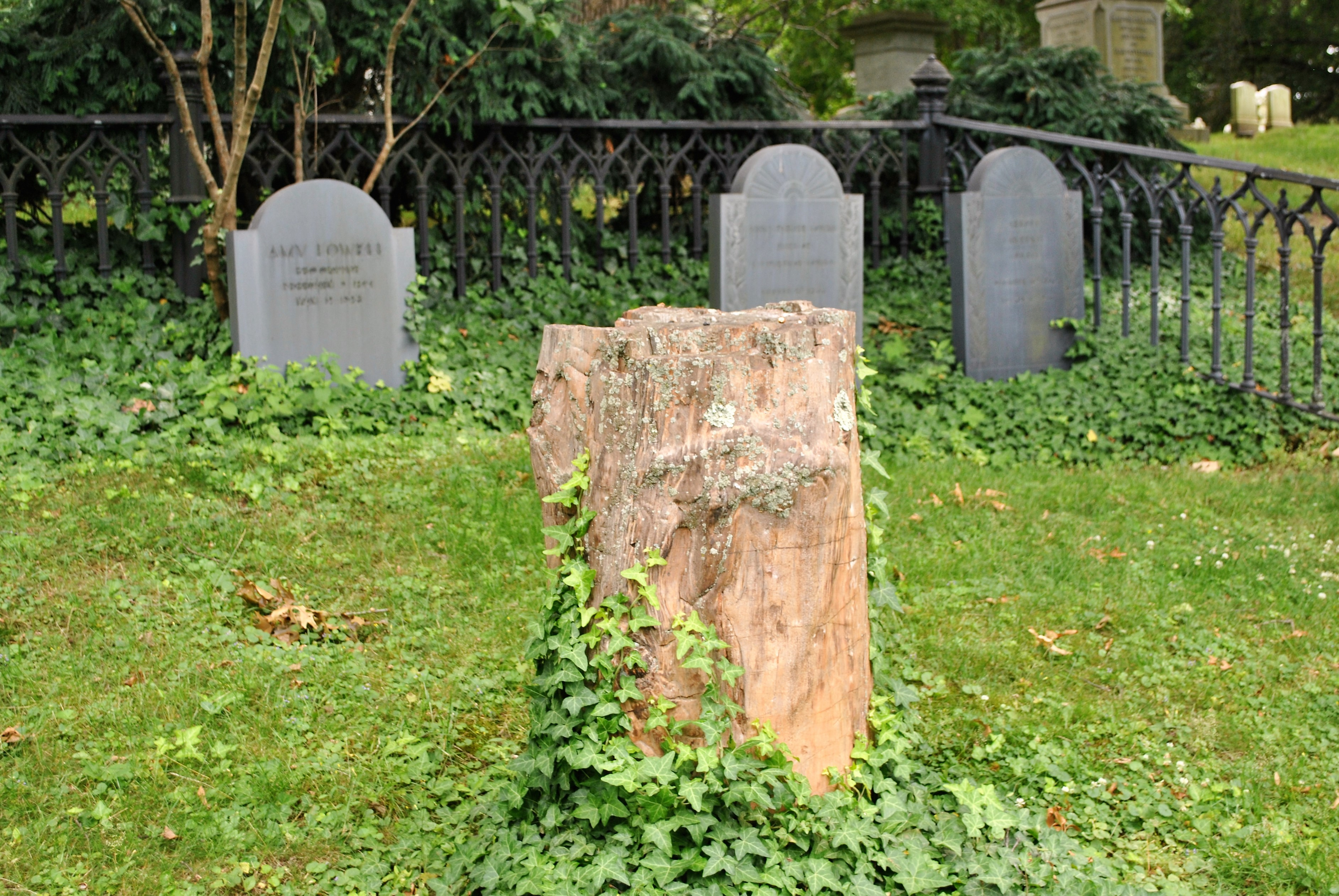
- Lowell family plot at Mount Auburn Cemetery
- Current region: United States; United Kingdom
- Connected families: Cabot; Roosevelt; Lawrence; Amory; Putnam; Astor
- Distinctions: Lowell, Massachusetts; Lowell Observatory; Lowell Institute; Lowell House
- Estates: Elmwood (Cambridge, Massachusetts); 805 Fifth Avenue, NYC; Nos. 7 & 8 Park Street, Boston; President's House (Harvard); Bibury Court

The Lowell family is one of the Boston Brahmin families of New England, known for both intellectual and commercial achievements.

The family had emigrated to Boston from England in 1639, led by the patriarch Percival Lowle (c. 1570–1664/1665). The surname was spelt in many ways until it was standardised as Lowell from about 1721, apparently by the Rev. John Lowell. It was a later John Lowell (1743–1802) from whom the famous dynasty was descended.

== Background ==
The Lowells originally settled on the North Shore at Cape Ann after they arrived in Boston on June 23, 1639. The patriarch, Percival Lowle, was born in Portbury before possibly becoming a merchant in Bristol and later arriving in the New World.

By the 19th and 20th centuries, the Lowells descended from John Lowell (1743–1802) were widely considered to be one of America's most accomplished families.

Massachusetts Bay Colony Governor John Winthrop needed solid, dependable people to settle the North Shore area as a buffer against the French from Canada and urged that the Lowells relocate to Newburyport on the Merrimack River, at the border of the failing Province of Maine.

== Ancestry in the UK ==
=== Origin of the name ===
Many suggestions about the origins of the medieval name Lowle were offered during the late 20th century. Some argued that it was Welsh or Saxon while others supported the name was of Norman origin. One possibility is that it originates from the Latin word lupellus (wolf-cub) from Latin lupus (wolf).

Lowell family historian Delmar R. Lowell, gave much weight and persuasion to the origins of the name Lowle in his work and he and others concluded the Lowles of England were unquestionably of Norman descent.

There were still Louels in Scotland on the Scottish Marches in the Royal Burgh of Roxburgh when Edward Longshanks, King of England, ordered the nobility and gentry in Scotland to swear an oath of allegiance to him in the Ragman Roll in 1291. It is during this period, in 1288, that the earliest documentation for the name Lowle appears. William Lowle of Yardley in Worcestershire is documented as a yeoman, and standing as a witness to a border dispute between two of his neighbours. It is from this period that Delmar Lowell traces the descent of the Lowles through England until their departure for the colonies.

Documentation for this period also exists in The National Archives of England showing that there were also Lowels in the Welsh Marches. In 1317, William de Braose, 2nd Baron Braose petitioned King Edward II, the King's Council, and the Parliament to request that Roger Mortimer, 1st Earl of March send two justices to arrest and bring to trial 200–300 men he accused of attacking his Knights and Ministers and for, "trespasses made against the King's peace to Brewose and his people of Gower.", a peninsula, part of Glamorgan in Wales. Members named in this band of men included Ieuan and Griffith Lowel for the attack at Eynon.

=== Coat of arms ===
The Harleian Society, a British publisher of the official Royal Heraldic visitations, describes the Lowle Coate of Arms from the herald's records taken in Somersetshire in the years 1573, 1591, and 1623.

- Blazon: Sable, a dexter hand couped at the wrist grasping three darts, one in pale and two in saltire, all in argent.
- Crest: A Stag's head cabossed, between the attires a pheon azure.
- Motto: Occasionem Cognosce (oh-kay-see-OH-nem kogg-NOHS-keh).

The coat of arms has a shield with black field displaying a right hand cut-off at the wrist and grabbing three arrows, one vertical and two crossed diagonally, in silver; above the shield is a male deer's head with a barbed, broad arrowhead in blue between its antlers. A loose translation of the family motto is Know Your Opportunity.

The use of the Lowle coat of arms has varied slightly between the generations; some families omitted the pheon azure or substituted blunted bolts for the pointed darts; and one generation, notably a pastor, used an urn in his families crest instead of the stag's head. The right for a man to bear arms traditionally passes from father to eldest son; occasionally subsequent generations change the coat of arms to reflect their lives or vocations better, sometimes even "quartering" their coat of arms with another family by way of marriage.

Some believe that the Lowle coat of arms fell into abeyance when Percival Lowle and his sons emigrated to Massachusetts. They were still subjects of the Crown and its favor until the colonies declared Independence from Britain in 1776 and were entitled to bear their coat of arms. Also, there were a number of Lowles who remained in England who could claim the right.

== Family tree ==
The Lowell family of Boston was traditionally known as the descendants of John Lowell (1743–1802) of Newburyport. His descendants were the Lowells, well known as members of the Boston Brahmins.

- John Lowell (1743–1802), Member of the Continental Congress and Federal Judge
  - John Lowell (1769–1840), lawyer and Federalist
    - John Amory Lowell (1798–1881), industrialist, philanthropist
      - John Lowell (1824–1897), Federal Judge
        - John Lowell (1856–1922), lawyer
          - Mary Emlen Lowell (1884–1975), Countess of Berkeley, m. Randal Thomas Mowbray Berkeley, 8th Earl of Berkeley
          - Ralph Lowell (1890–1978), philanthropist, founder of WGBH and PBS, m. Charlotte Loring
            - John Lowell (1919-2011), banker and philanthropist, Nahant Town Moderator, m. Eleanor Ta
            - Ralph Lowell, Jr.
            - James Lowell
            - Emelen Lowell
            - Lucy Lowell
          - Olivia Lowell (1898–1977), m. Augustus Thorndike (1896–1986)
        - James Lowell (1869–1933), Federal Judge
      - Augustus Lowell (1830–1900), industrialist, philanthropist m. Katherine Bigelow Lawrence (1832–1896), daughter of Abbott Lawrence, Ambassador to the United Kingdom, congressman, industrialist, and original founder of the Harvard School of Engineering
        - Percival Lowell (1855–1916), astronomer
        - Abbott Lawrence Lowell (1856–1943), President of Harvard University, 1909–33
        - Katharine Lowell (1858–1925), m. Alfred Roosevelt (1856–1891), banker, director of Roosevelt & Son, and Gallatin National Bank
          - Elfrida Roosevelt (1883–1963), m. Sir Orme Bigland Clarke, 4th Baronet, military officer
            - Sir Humphrey Clarke, 5th Baronet (1906–1973)
              - Sir Toby Clarke, 6th Baronet (1939–2019), British businessman
                - Theodora Roosevelt Clarke (1985–), United Kingdom parliamentarian
                - Sir Lawrence Clarke, 7th Baronet (1990–), Olympic hurdler and investment banker
          - Major James Alfred Roosevelt (1885–1919), military officer and engineer, awarded the Silver Star for valor during the Meuse–Argonne offensive
          - Katharine Roosevelt (1887–1961), m. Josiah Stanley Reeve, sportsman and foxhunter
        - Elizabeth Lowell (1862–1935), m. William Lowell Putnam (see below)
          - George Putnam (1889–1960), founder of Putnam Investments
          - Katherine Putnam (1890–1983), m. Harvey Bundy (1888–1963)
            - William Bundy (1917–2000), foreign affairs advisor to John F. Kennedy and Lyndon Johnson
            - McGeorge Bundy (1919–1996), U.S. National Security Advisor
            - Katharine Lawrence Bundy (1923–2014), m. Hugh Auchincloss Jr. (1915–1998), 1st cousin once removed of Hugh D. Auchincloss
              - Hugh Auchincloss III (b. 1949), m. Laurie Hollis Glimcher (b. 1951), divorced; daughter of Melvin J. Glimcher
                - Jacob Daniel Auchincloss (b. 1988), U.S. Representative for Massachusetts's 4th congressional district since 2021
          - Roger Putnam (1893–1972), Mayor of Springfield, Director of the Economic Stability Administration (ESA)
        - Amy Lowell (1874–1925), Pulitzer Prize-winning poet
  - Francis Cabot Lowell (1775–1817), pioneer textile industrialist
    - John Lowell, Jr. (1799–1836), Founder of the Lowell Institute
    - Francis Cabot Lowell, Jr. (1803–1874), industrialist
      - George Gardner Lowell (1830–1885)
        - Francis Cabot Lowell (1855–1911), Federal Judge
      - Edward Jackson Lowell (1845–1894), historian
        - Guy Lowell (1870–1927), architect
        - Frederick Eldridge Lowell (1874–1933), landscape painter
          - Mariana Lowell (1904–1979) m. Jacques Barzun (1907–2012), historian
            - Roger Barzun (1941–), lawyer
              - Matthew Barzun (1970–), Ambassador to the United Kingdom and Sweden m. Brooke Brown
  - Rebecca Russell Lowell (1779–1853), m. Samuel Pickering Gardner (1767–1843)
    - John Lowell Gardner (1804–1884)
      - John Lowell Gardner (1837–1898), m. Isabella Stewart (1840–1924)
  - Charles Lowell (1782–1861), Unitarian minister
    - Charles Russell Lowell (1807–1870)
      - Charles Russell Lowell, Jr. (1835–1864), Civil War general, m. Josephine Shaw
      - Harriet Lowell (1836–1920), m. George Putnam (1834–1917)
        - William Lowell Putnam (1861–1923), lawyer and banker, m. Elizabeth Lowell (see above)
    - Mary Traill Spence Lowell Putnam (1810–1898), author, translator
    - Robert Traill Spence Lowell (1816–1891)
      - Robert T.S. Lowell (1860–1887)
        - Robert T.S. Lowell (1887–1950), naval officer
          - Robert Lowell (1917–1977), Pulitzer Prize–winning poet
    - James Russell Lowell (1819–1891), American Romantic poet, Ambassador to Spain and England

== Notable Lowells ==
- Abbott Lawrence Lowell, lawyer, historian, philanthropist, and former President of Harvard University
- Amy Lowell, poet, critic, publisher, and sister of Abbott Lawrence and Percival Lowell
- Augustus Lowell, businessman, philanthropist, and father of Percival, Abbott Lawrence, and Amy Lowell
- Carey Lowell, model, actress and philanthropist
- Charles Russell Lowell, Sr., Unitarian pastor, son of The Old Judge, father of James Russell, and great-great-grandfather of Robert Lowell
- Charles Russell Lowell, Union General and Civil War hero
- Delmar R. Lowell, pastor, Civil War veteran, and genealogist
- Edward Jackson Lowell, author and father of Guy Lowell
- Francis Cabot Lowell (1775–1817), businessman and namesake of Lowell, Massachusetts
- Francis Cabot Lowell (1855–1911), U.S. Congressman and Federal Judge
- Guy Lowell, architect and landscape designer
- James Russell Lowell, poet, critic, publisher, abolitionist, Harvard professor, and foreign diplomat
- Joan Lowell, actress and newspaper reporter
- Rev. John Lowell, colonial era Massachusetts minister
- John Lowell aka The Old Judge, Federal Judge appointed by President George Washington and American Revolutionary
- John Lowell, Jr., aka The Boston Rebel, Federalist lawyer and son of The Old Judge
- John Lowell, Jr. Son of Industrialist Francis Cabot Lowell and founder of the Lowell Institute
- John Amory Lowell, businessman and philanthropist
- Judge John Lowell, Federal judge and son of John Amory Lowell
- Josephine Shaw Lowell, sister of Civil War hero Robert Gould Shaw, first woman to hold a public office in New York City, and wife of Gen. Charles Russell Lowell
- Maria White Lowell, poet, abolitionist, and wife of James Russell Lowell
- Percival Lowell, author, astronomer, founder of Lowell Observatory, and brother of Amy and Abbott Lawrence Lowell
- Ralph Lowell, businessman, philanthropist, and founding force behind Boston's WGBH public television
- Robert Lowell, poet and lecturer

Other notable descendants:

- Sir Cuthbert Ackroyd, 1st Baronet, Lord Mayor of London (1955–56)
- Godfrey Lowell Cabot, businessman and philanthropist
- Julian Lowell Coolidge, mathematician
- Abbott Lowell Cummings, noted Yale architectural historian
- John Lowell Gardner II, art collector
- William Lowell Putnam, banker, lawyer, and philanthropist
- William Lowell Putnam III alpinist, broadcasting executive
- Ava Lowle Willing, Philadelphia socialite and ex-wife of John Jacob Astor IV (RMS Titanic casualty)
- Robert Warren Miller, champion sailor and founder of DFS Group
- Marie-Chantal, Crown Princess of Greece
- Princess Maria-Olympia of Greece and Denmark
- Prince Constantine Alexios of Greece and Denmark, future titular King of Greece

Other descendants of Percival Lowle:

- McGeorge Bundy, former National Security Advisor to Presidents John F. Kennedy and Lyndon Johnson
- Dick Cheney, Ex-Vice President of the United States
- Herman Melville, author
- John Lothrop Motley, historian
- Tuesday Weld, actress
- Tennessee Williams, playwright
- William Whipple, signer of the United States Declaration of Independence
- T. S. Eliot, poet
- Edward Arlington Robinson, poet
- Elliot Richardson, United States Attorney General
- Jerome Napoleon Bonaparte, son of Jerome Bonaparte, King of Westphalia
- Jerome Napoleon Bonaparte II, soldier, officer of the Legion of Honour
- Charles Joseph Bonaparte, United States Attorney General and Secretary of the Navy in, his distant relative by marriage, Theodore Roosevelt's cabinet

=== Portrait gallery ===
James Russell Lowell

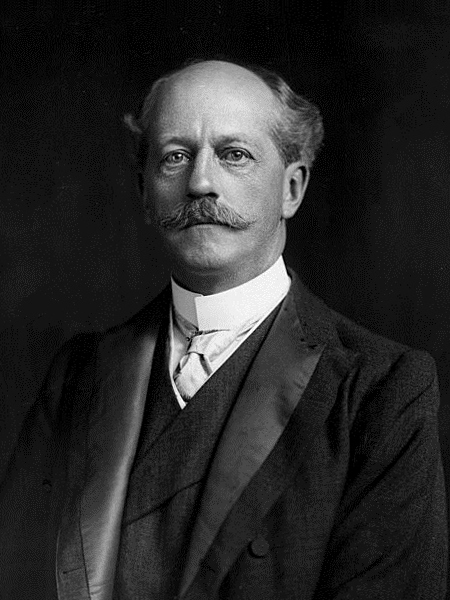
Percival Lowell

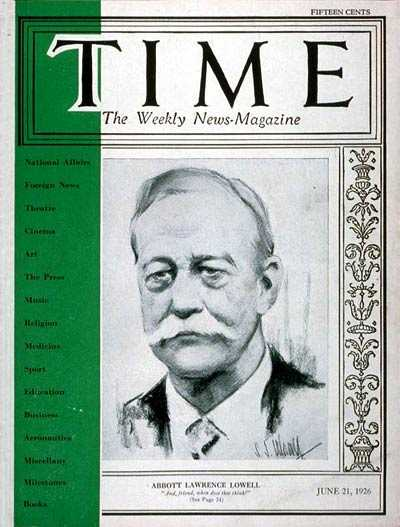
A. Lawrence Lowell

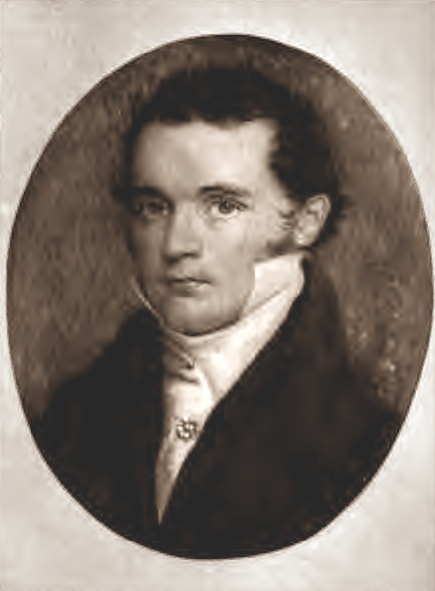
John Lowell, Jr.

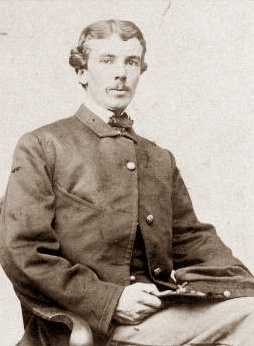
Charles Russell Lowell

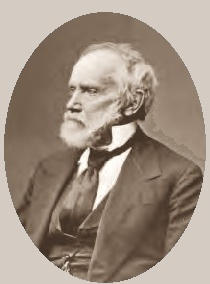
John Amory Lowell

== See also ==
- First Families of Boston
- Lowell disambiguation page
