= President's House (Harvard) =

Residence for presidents of Harvard University

Coordinates: 42°22′24.3″N 71°6′55.1″W

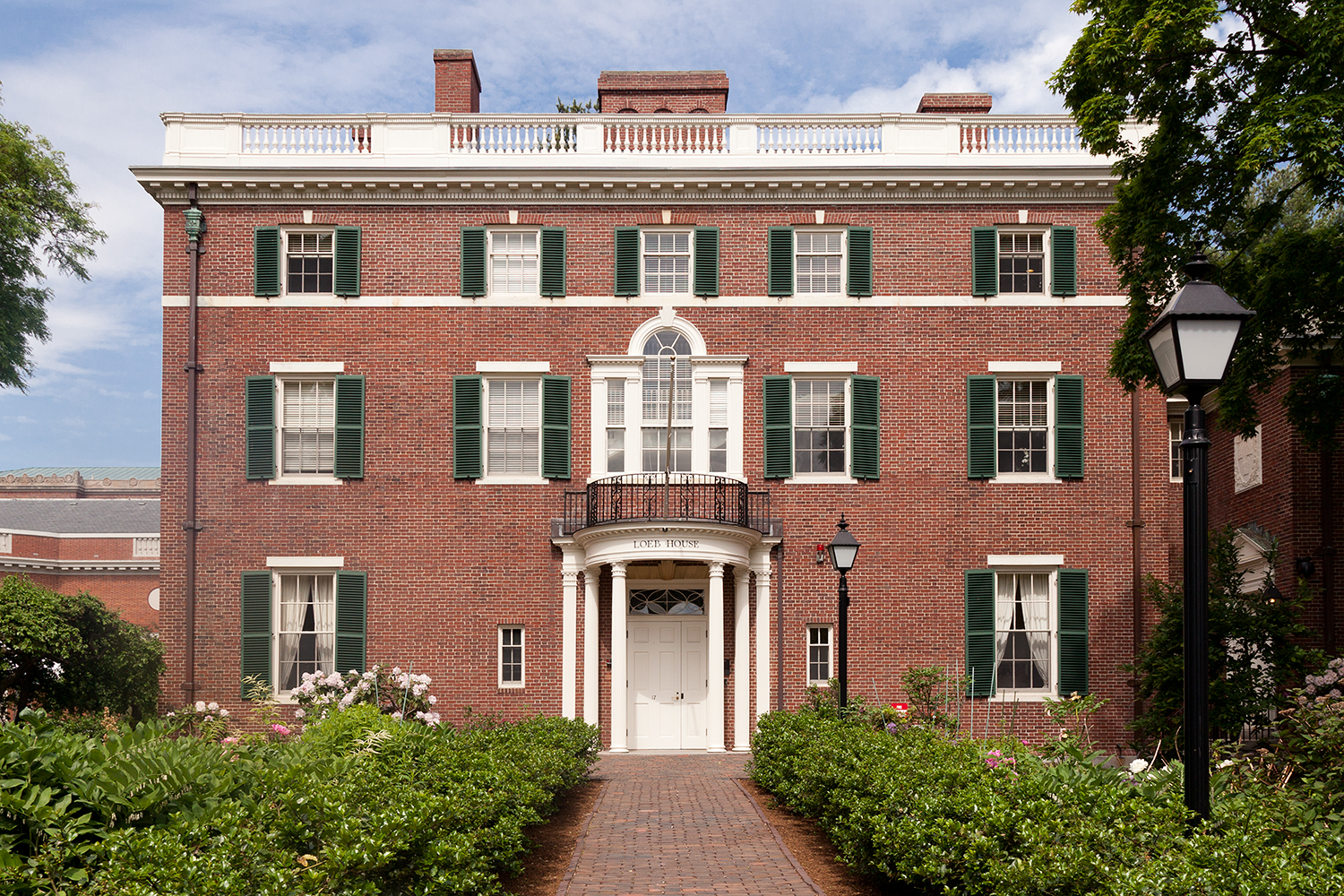
Loeb House

President's House is a historic house at 17 Quincy Street, on the campus of Harvard University in Cambridge, Massachusetts. Built and paid for by the Lowell family, it served as a residence for Harvard presidents until 1971, when Derek Bok (1971-1991) moved his family to Elmwood, another Lowell family property. In 1995, the building was renamed Loeb House.

== History ==
President's House was donated to Harvard University by then president A. Lawrence Lowell. It was designed by Lowell's cousin, Guy Lowell and completed in 1912. During World War II, President James Bryant Conant and his family allowed the United States Navy to use the building for its V-12 Navy College Training Program. In 1971, Harvard president Derek Bok chose to live at Elmwood, off Brattle Street, which had previously housed deans of the Faculty of Arts and Sciences. In 1995, the building was renamed to honor steady benefactors, John Langeloth Loeb Sr. and Frances Lehman Loeb by President Neil Rudenstine. There are historic records that indicate that the University had wanted to name the building after its actual donor but had been opposed by A. Lawrence Lowell himself. When the building was renamed a number of students and alumni successfully complained about the lack of contemporary acknowledgment there and a painting and plaque were added honoring the actual donor.

== Current usage ==
Since the Boks' departure, the building has housed the university governing board offices and is often utilized by the two boards, the overseers and the corporation, for formal meetings. The first floor of the house is used for a variety of special events ranging from dinners to large receptions, and is available for rent.
