= John Lowell (judge, born 1824) =

American judge

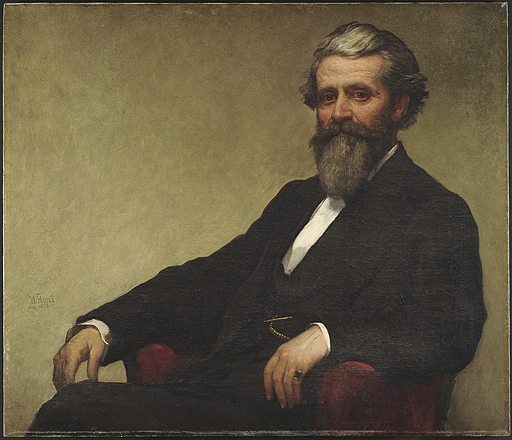
- Portrait of Lowell by William Morris Hunt, 1872

Judge of the United States Circuit Courts for the First Circuit
- In office December 18, 1878 – May 1, 1884
- Appointed by: Rutherford B. Hayes
- Preceded by: George Foster Shepley
- Succeeded by: LeBaron Bradford Colt

Judge of the United States District Court for the District of Massachusetts
- In office March 11, 1865 – January 9, 1879
- Appointed by: Abraham Lincoln
- Preceded by: Peleg Sprague
- Succeeded by: Thomas Leverett Nelson

Personal details
- Born: John Lowell; October 18, 1824 Boston, Massachusetts, U.S.
- Died: May 14, 1897 (aged 72) Brookline, Massachusetts, U.S.
- Education: Harvard University (A.B.); Harvard Law School (LL.B.)
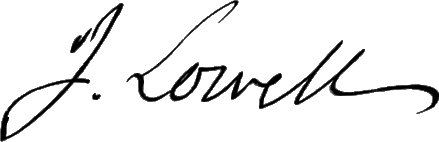
- Signature

John Lowell (October 18, 1824 – May 14, 1897) was a United States circuit judge of the United States Circuit Courts for the First Circuit and previously was a United States district judge of the United States District Court for the District of Massachusetts.

== Education and career ==
Born on October 18, 1824, in Boston, Massachusetts, Lowell received an Artium Baccalaureus degree in 1843 from Harvard University and a Bachelor of Laws in 1845 from Harvard Law School. He entered private practice in Boston from 1846 to 1865. He was editor of the Monthly Law Reporter from 1856 to 1860.

== Federal judicial service ==
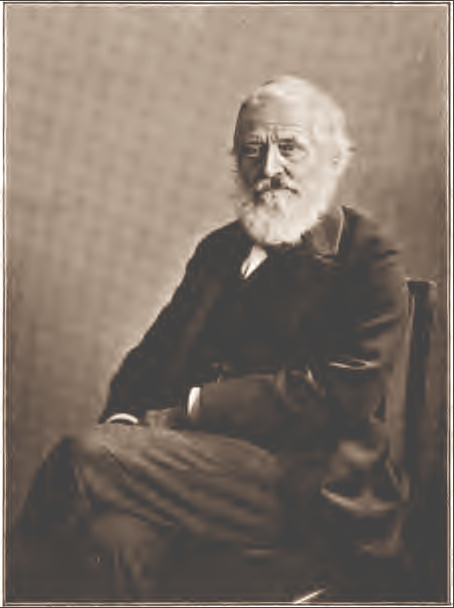
Lowell in the 1890s.

Lowell was nominated by President Abraham Lincoln on March 11, 1865, to a seat on the United States District Court for the District of Massachusetts vacated by Judge Peleg Sprague. He was confirmed by the United States Senate on March 11, 1865, and received his commission the same day. His service terminated on January 9, 1879, due to his elevation to the First Circuit.

Lowell was nominated by President Rutherford B. Hayes on December 16, 1878, to a seat on the United States Circuit Courts for the First Circuit vacated by Judge George Foster Shepley. He was confirmed by the Senate on December 18, 1878, and received his commission the same day. His service terminated on May 1, 1884, due to his resignation.

== Later career and death ==
Following his resignation from the federal bench, Lowell resumed private practice in Boston from 1884 to 1897. He died on May 14, 1897, in Brookline, Massachusetts.

== Family ==
Boston-born Lowell was the son of John Amory Lowell (1798–1881), the philanthropist, and his wife Susan Cabot Lowell (1801–1827). His parents were first cousins, both having as their paternal grandfather, Judge John Lowell (1743–1802); Susan Cabot Lowell < Francis Cabot Lowell < Judge John Lowell > John Lowell Jr. (lawyer) > John Amory Lowell. He was the father of James Arnold Lowell (1869-1933), and grandfather of Ralph Lowell through his eldest son John (1856–1922).

== See also ==
- Lowell family
- First Families of Boston

== Sources ==
Legal offices
Preceded by Peleg Sprague	Judge of the United States District Court for the District of Massachusetts; 1865–1879	Succeeded by Thomas Leverett Nelson
Preceded by George Foster Shepley	Judge of the United States Circuit Courts for the First Circuit; 1878–1884	Succeeded by LeBaron Bradford Colt
