= John Lowell Jr. (philanthropist) =

American philanthropist

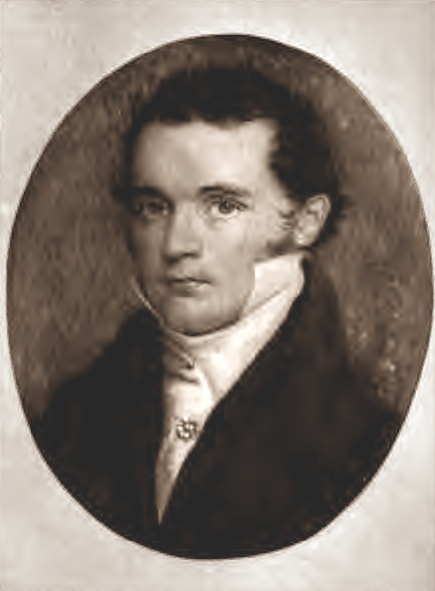
- John Lowell Jr.
- Born: May 11, 1799
- Died: March 4, 1836 (aged 36)
- Occupations: Businessman and founder of Lowell institute
- Parent(s): Francis Cabot Lowell and Hannah Jackson Lowell

John Lowell Jr. (May 11, 1799 – March 4, 1836) was an American businessman, early philanthropist, and through his will, founder of the Lowell Institute.

== Family ==
Lowell was the son of pioneer industrialist Francis Cabot Lowell (1775–1817), one of the founders of the Boston region's textile industry, and Hannah Jackson, sister of Patrick Tracy Jackson, another industrial pioneer. His grandfather and namesake, Judge John Lowell (1743–1802), referred to as The Old Judge, served in the Congress of the Confederation in 1782 and was appointed later to federal benches by presidents George Washington and John Adams.

After receiving his early education in the Boston public schools, young Lowell was taken by his father to Europe and placed at the high school of Edinburgh. In 1813, at the age of 14, he returned to America and entered Harvard College. Plagued with ill health, he left college after two years and entered his family's mercantile firm, sailing before the mast to India, the East Indies, and England.

== Career ==
Returning from his voyages with invigorated health, Lowell devoted himself to business and, in his leisure time, to book collecting, reading, and politics, serving on the Boston Common Council and in the Massachusetts State Senate. The 1820s and 1830s were a turbulent period in New England, marked by intense political and religious conflict between an insurgent popular democracy, which challenged economic and religious establishments, and an emergent capitalist elite which, though almost invariably defeated at the polls, was learning to use its wealth to advance its political agenda through non-political means.

Conflict between the Unitarian elite and the evangelical urban masses intensified in the 1820s, as followers of popular ministers like Lyman Beecher openly challenged elite-controlled institutions like Harvard and the Boston Athenaeum using a variety of voluntary associations—young men's and mechanics societies, lyceums, debating clubs, and temperance groups. The continuing erosion of the elite's cultural authority was deeply troubling to Lowell and his contemporaries.

Within a few short months in 1830 and 1831, tragedy struck Lowell's household, with the deaths of his wife and two children. Heartbroken, John Lowell retired from business and attempted to assuage his grief with travel, first to the western states and subsequently in Europe, the Middle East, Africa, and Asia. Before departing for Europe in 1832, he wrote a will in which, according to his biographer, "he set aside a large portion of his ample property to be expended, forever, in the support of those courses of lectures in the city of Boston."

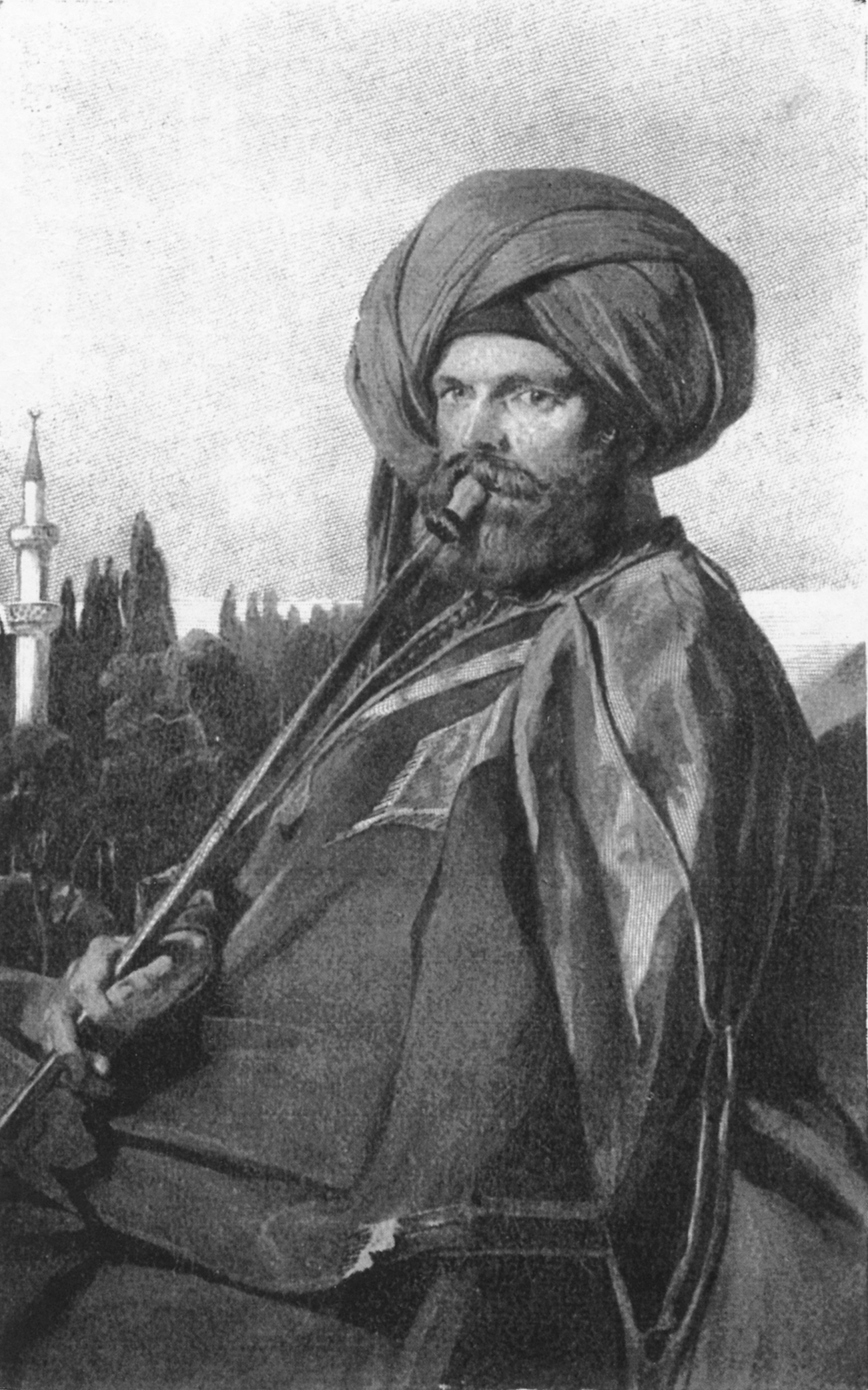
Portrait of John Lowell Jr., made during his travels in Egypt

Over the course of the next four years, Lowell traveled through France, the Netherlands, Belgium, Italy, Greece, Turkey, Armenia, Persia, and Egypt, down the Nile to Khartoum, through Ethiopia, and ultimately to India. Although the bequest providing for "the maintenance and support of public lectures, to be delivered in Boston, upon philosophy, natural history, the arts and sciences, or any of them, as the trustee shall, from time to time, deem expedient for the promotion of the moral, and intellectual, and physical instruction or education of the citizens of Boston" had been set forth before his departure from Boston, "– in a codicil to his will written "amidst the ruins of Thebes" and, subsequently, in letters written from Egypt, he further amplified his ideas about the trust. Although he expressed a preference for lectures on religion and on topics that would contribute to the material prosperity of the region, he ceded to his trustee discretion to "establish lectures on any subject that, in his opinion, the wants and taste of the age may demand".

Lowell became gravely ill during a camel trip across the Egyptian desert and died on March 4, 1836, shortly after arriving in Bombay, India.

=== Lowell Institute ===
Although large-scale philanthropic gestures were a relative novelty in early nineteenth century America, the idea of an elite institution providing popular lectures by eminent scientists and scholars was not. Having spent much of his youth in England, Lowell was undoubtedly familiar with the Royal Institution – an entity that sponsored basic scientific research and popular lectures and demonstrations. Lowell, a supporter of the Lyceum movement, first showed interest in providing education for the public as a founding member of the Boston Society for the Diffusion of Useful Knowledge in 1830. After becoming ill while traveling through Egypt in 1835, John Lowell Jr. revised his will to create a trust to fund free public lectures in Boston on the subjects of philosophy, natural history, and the arts and sciences.

The trust—or Lowell Institute, as it came to be known—had an unusual mode of governance: a single trustee who was empowered to appoint his successor and who was, in the language of Lowell's will, "always choose in preference to all others some male descendant of my grandfather, John Lowell, provided there be one who is competent to hold the office of trustee, and of the name of Lowell." The first lecture supported by the trust, by Yale geologist Benjamin Silliman, was offered in December 1839.

Under its first trustee, the founder's first cousin, John Amory Lowell (1798–1881), the Institute gained success. The list of Lowell Lecturers during his tenure were some of the most internationally celebrated figures in science, literature, political economy, philosophy, and theology, including Britain's most celebrated geologist, Sir Charles Lyell, Swiss naturalist Louis Agassiz, and novelists Charles Dickens and William Makepeace Thackeray.

The lectures were so immensely popular that crowds crushed the windows of the Old Corner Bookstore where the tickets were distributed and certain series had to be repeated by popular demand.

== See also ==
- Lowell family
- First Families of Boston
- Lowell Institute
- Charles Gleyre

== Notes ==
Preceded by Created	Trustee of Lowell Institute; 1814–1836	Succeeded by John Amory Lowell
