= Boston Municipal Research Bureau =

Research organization

- Abbreviation: BMRB
- Formation: 1932
- Headquarters: Boston, Massachusetts United States
- Interim President: Martha M. Walz
- Key people: Henry Lee Shattuck; Diane Smith; Elaine Dandurand Beattie; James Michael
- Revenue: $639,424 (2014)
- Expenses: $760,956 (2014)
- Website: bmrb.org

The Boston Municipal Research Bureau is a non-profit, member supported research organization which focuses on urban issues in Boston, Massachusetts. The bureau was founded in 1932, and has a board of directors composed of major business and institutional non-profit leaders from the city of Boston. Today, the bureau publishes research reports and papers, "monitor[s] state and local fiscal affairs[,] highlight[s] major policy challenges, from contract negotiations to tax policy," and "studies municipal budgeting, management, and labor issues."

== History ==
The bureau was founded in 1932 by business leaders led by Henry Lee Shattuck. Shattuck, a member of a well-established New England family, was a local businessman, an attorney at the Boston-based firm now known as Ropes & Gray, the treasurer and senior fellow of the board of Harvard University, a member of the Massachusetts state legislature, and later a member of the Boston City Council.

The organization was initially founded as a fiscal watchdog focused on the mayoral administration of James Michael Curley, the powerful Boston mayor who was later elected Governor of Massachusetts, and then later spent a portion of his final mayoral term in prison.

In 1988 Dawn-Marie Driscoll, an executive at former Boston-based department store chain Filene's, became the first woman to lead the organization's board.

Since 1985, the bureau has organized the annual Henry L. Shattuck Public Service Awards to honor employees of the City of Boston. Since 1998, the bureau has also recognized business and nonprofit leaders involved in public service in the Boston area, through the Shattuck City Champions Award.

== Staff and board ==
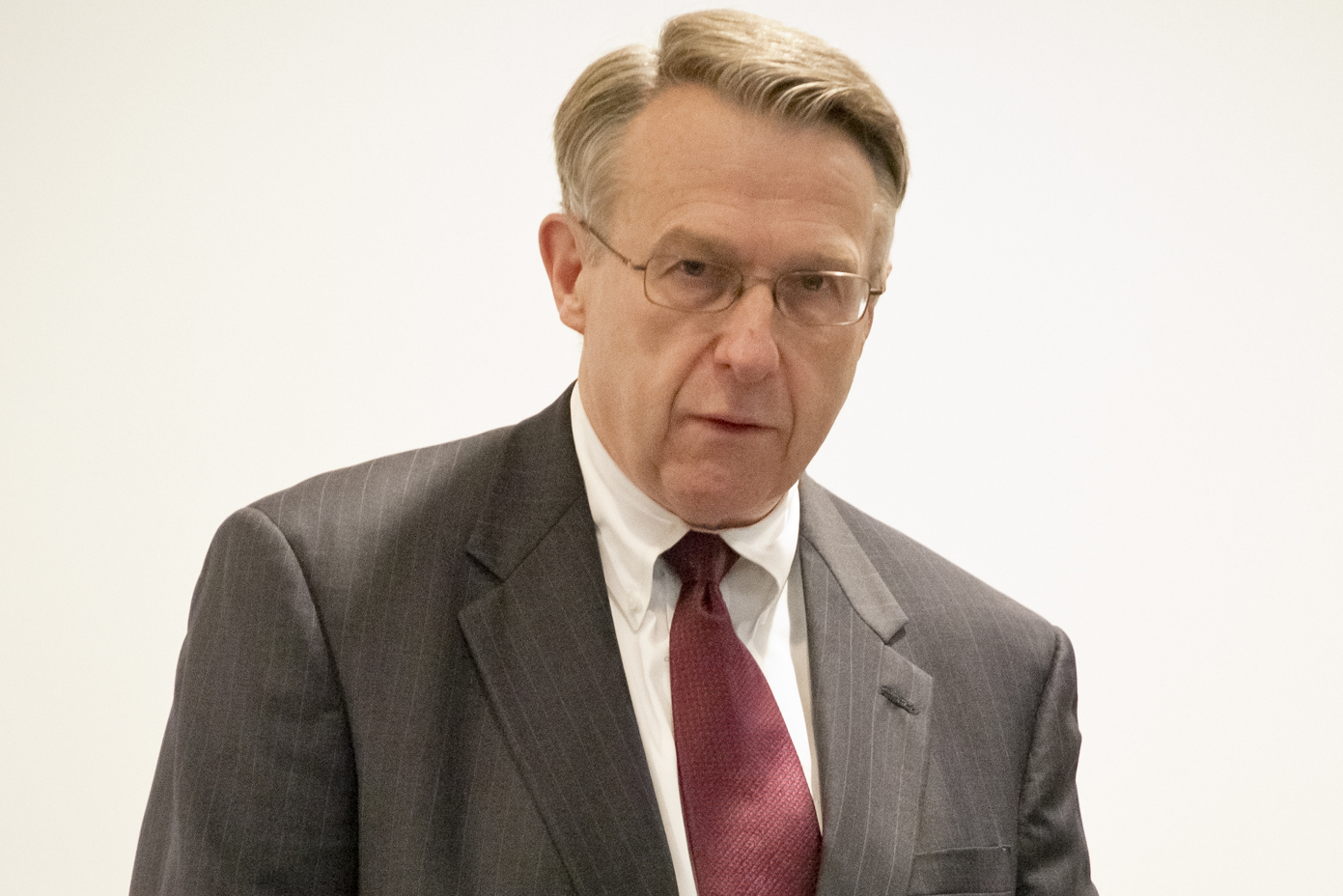
Samuel R. Tyler, Former long-time President of Boston Municipal Research Bureau

The bureau has offices and a full-time staff based in the Downtown Crossing neighborhood of Boston. The staff is responsible for the bureau's fact-finding mission, and publishes reports and papers, testifies at public hearings, shadows public officials, and provides quotes to local media. Martha M. Walz is the current Interim President. In November 2023, she succeeded Pam Kocher, who began her tenure as president in 2019 after serving in other roles at the Bureau for several years. Ms. Kocher was preceded by Samuel R. Tyler who served as President of the Bureau for more than 40 years.

In addition, the bureau has a board of directors composed of executives from many large businesses, universities and law firms based in Boston, including State Street Corporation, Harvard University, and Ropes & Gray. The Executive Committee of the board had many members who were also members of the so-called "Vault", an informal collection of the heads of the largest businesses in Boston.
