= Ralph Lowell =

American philanthropist (1890–1978)

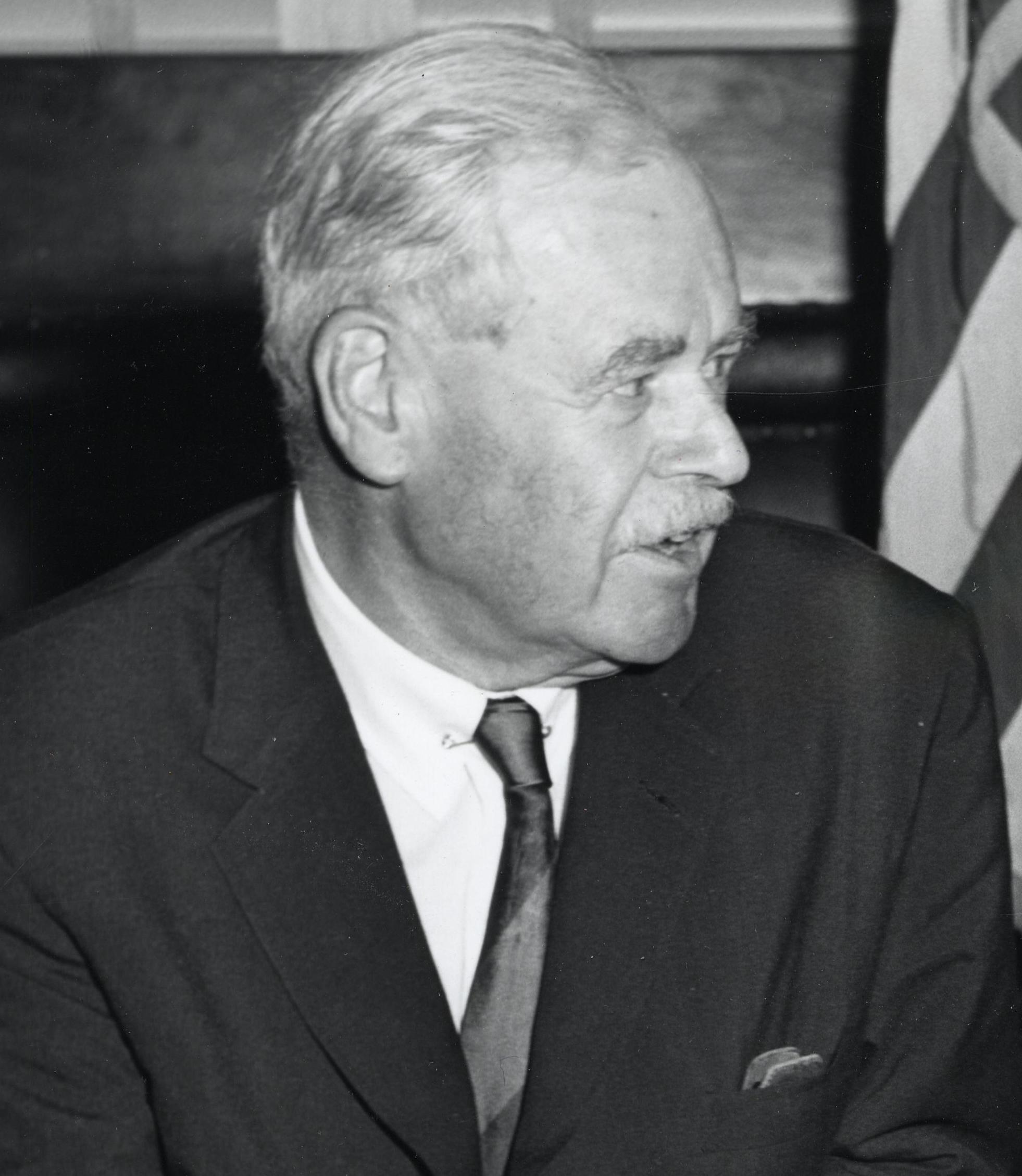
- Born: July 23, 1890; Chestnut Hill, Massachusetts
- Died: May 15, 1978 (aged 87); Boston, Massachusetts
- Known for: WGBH-TV, WGBH radio

Major Ralph Lowell (July 23, 1890 – May 15, 1978) was a World War I veteran, banker, and philanthropist from Boston.

Lowell was born in Chestnut Hill, Massachusetts, to John and Mary Emlen Lowell (Lowell 1899, p 302). Lowell graduated from Harvard College in 1912. He married Charlotte Loring (1897–1981) on September 1, 1917.

== Career ==
Ralph Lowell chose to pursue a career in banking and finance, as his family had a long history in business and banking in Boston. He eventually became president of the Boston Safe Deposit and Trust Company. And in 1955, Ralph received an LL.D. from Bates College.

== Philanthropist ==
Lowell was appointed as the sole Trustee of the Lowell Institute, in 1943, upon the death of his cousin, Harvard President A. Lawrence Lowell. Lowell would serve as Trustee of the Lowell Institute for the rest of his life and named his son, John Lowell, to succeed him.

In cooperation with another Harvard President, James B. Conant, Lowell used his position at the Institute to help found the WGBH radio and television stations. He served as president on the board of the WGBH Educational Foundation from 1951 into the 1970s.

Grand Bostonian
"In 1973, Lowell was one of seven citizens officially recognized as 'Grand Bostonians' for lives that 'mirrored the spirit and dignity that have made Boston and its people so extraordinary.' The years of Lowell's philanthropic and civic works paralleled significant transformations in the political, social, and cultural landscape of Boston, and his remarkable achievements reflect his key role in the making of a 'New Boston' during the mid-twentieth century." (Gelfand 1998)

Lowell died in Boston on May 15, 1978, of pneumonia at the age of eighty-seven and was buried in the Old Westwood Cemetery in Westwood, Massachusetts.

== See also ==
- Lowell family
- First Families of Boston
- Lowell Institute

Preceded by A. Lawrence Lowell	Trustee of Lowell Institute; 1943–1978	Succeeded by John Lowell
