= A. Lawrence Lowell =

American educator and legal scholar (1856–1943)

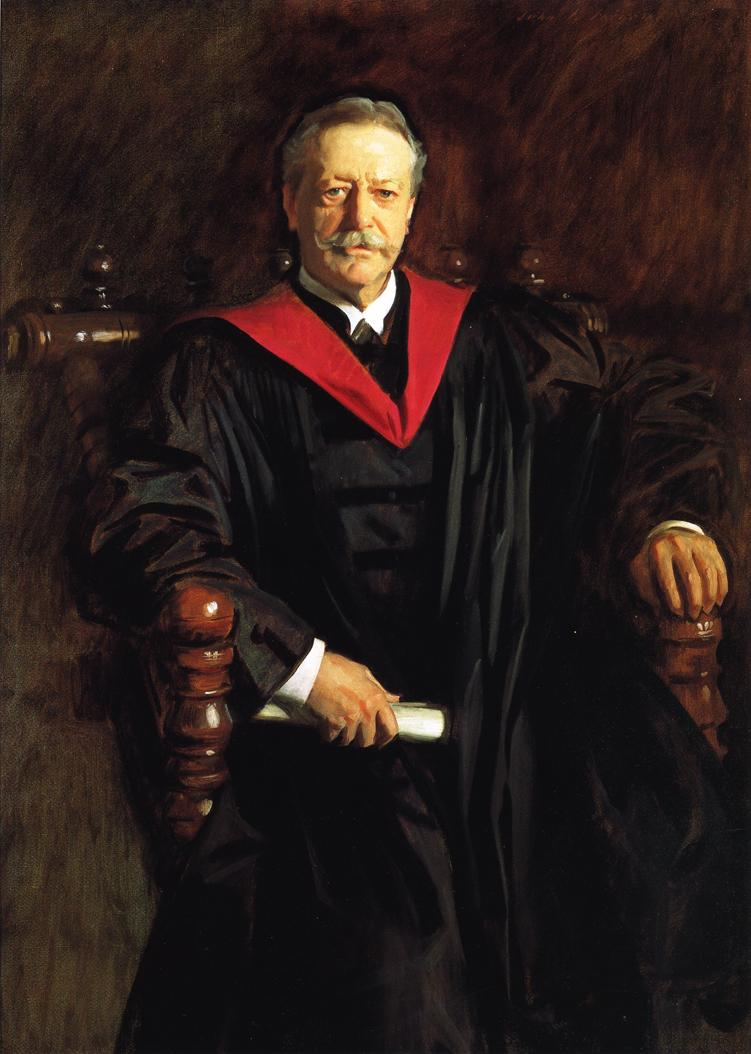
- 1923 portrait by John Singer Sargent

22nd President of Harvard University
- In office 1909–1933
- Preceded by: Charles William Eliot
- Succeeded by: James B. Conant

Personal details
- Born: Abbott Lawrence Lowell; December 13, 1856 Boston, Massachusetts, U.S.
- Died: January 6, 1943 (aged 86) Boston, Massachusetts, U.S.
- Spouse: Anna Parker (m. 1879; died 1930)
- Parent(s): Augustus Lowell; Katherine Bigelow
- Relatives: Lowell family
- Education: Harvard University (AB, LLB)

Abbott Lawrence Lowell (December 13, 1856 – January 6, 1943) was an American educator and legal scholar. He was the president of Harvard University from 1909 to 1933.

With an "aristocratic sense of mission and self-certainty," Lowell initiated significant reforms at Harvard. His years as president saw an expansion of the university in terms of the size of its physical infrastructure, its student body, and its endowment. His reform of undergraduate education established the system of majoring in a particular discipline that became the standard in American education.

His progressive reputation in education derived principally from his insistence on integrating social classes at Harvard and preventing students of wealthy backgrounds from living apart from their less wealthy peers, a position for which he was sometimes termed "a traitor to his class." He also recognized the university's obligation to serve the surrounding community, particularly in making college courses available to and putting college degrees within the reach of local schoolteachers. He demonstrated outspoken support for academic freedom during World War I and played a prominent role in urging the public to support American participation in the League of Nations following the war.

Yet his Harvard years saw two public disputes in which he argued for compromising basic principles of justice for the sake of his own personal vision of Harvard's mission with respect to assimilating non-traditional students. In one instance, he tried to limit Jewish enrollment to 15% of the student body. In the other, he tried to ban African-American students from living in the Freshman Halls when all of Harvard's new students were required to room there. In both cases the Harvard Board of Overseers insisted on the consistent application of liberal principles and overruled him.

== Early years ==
Lowell was born on December 13, 1856, in Boston, Massachusetts, the second son of Augustus Lowell and Katherine Bigelow Lowell. His mother was a cousin of architect Charles H. Bigelow. A member of the Brahmin Lowell family, his siblings included the poet Amy Lowell, the astronomer Percival Lowell, and Elizabeth Lowell Putnam, an early activist for prenatal care. They were the great-great-grandchildren of John Lowell and, on their mother's side, the grandchildren of Abbott Lawrence.

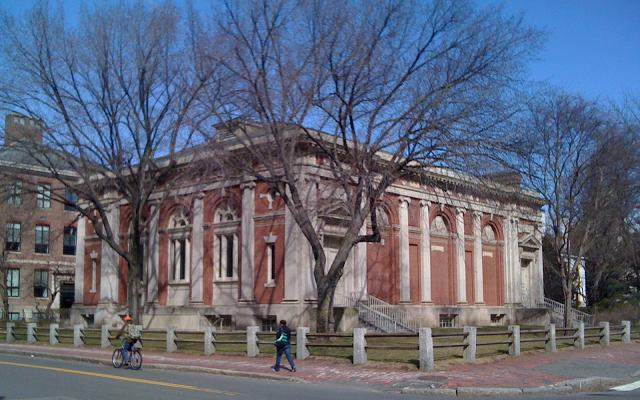
Lowell Lecture Hall

Lowell graduated from Noble and Greenough School in 1873 and attended Harvard College where he presented a thesis for honors in mathematics that addressed using quaternions to treat quadrics and graduated in 1877. While at Harvard, he was a member of the Hasty Pudding. He graduated from Harvard Law School in 1880 and practiced law from 1880 to 1897 in partnership with his cousin, Francis Cabot Lowell, with whom he wrote Transfer of Stock in Corporations, which appeared in 1884. On June 19, 1879, while a law student, he married a distant cousin, Anna Parker Lowell in King's Chapel in Boston and honeymooned in the Western U.S.

His first scholarly publications appeared before he undertook an academic career. Essays on Government appeared in 1889, designed to counter the arguments Woodrow Wilson made in his Congressional Government. The two volumes of Governments and Parties in Continental Europe followed in 1896. Lowell was elected a Fellow of the American Academy of Arts and Sciences, joining his father and brother, in 1897. He became a trustee of MIT in 1897. In 1899 Lowell was elected a member of the American Antiquarian Society. In 1909, he was elected to the American Philosophical Society.

== Harvard University ==
In 1897, Lowell became lecturer, and in 1898, professor of government at Harvard. His publishing career continued with the appearance of Colonial Civil Service in 1900, and The Government of England in two volumes in 1908. In December 1901, Lowell and his wife donated funds anonymously to erect a building housing a large lecture hall, a facility the university lacked at the time. It became the New Lecture Hall (later renamed Lowell Lecture Hall), at the corner of Oxford and Kirkland Streets, and held a 928-seat auditorium as well as 8 meeting rooms. In the 1990s after being damaged, the hall was renovated and now has 352 seats in the main hall, and eight classrooms with capacity of 22-24 people.

From relatively early in his professional career, Lowell worried about the role of racial and ethnic minorities in American society. As early as 1887, he wrote of the Irish: "What we need is not to dominate the Irish, but to absorb them ... We want them to become rich, and send their sons to our colleges, to share our prosperity and our sentiments. We do not want to feel that they are among us and yet not really part of us." He believed that only a homogeneous society could safeguard the achievements of American democracy. Sometime before 1906, he became an honorary vice-president of the Immigration Restriction League, an organization that promoted literacy tests and tightened enforcement of immigration laws. In 1910, he wrote approvingly in private of excluding Chinese immigrants entirely and of Southern states that denied the franchise to black citizens. Publicly he consistently adopted assimilation as the solution to absorbing other groups, limiting their numbers to levels he believed would allow American society to absorb them without being changed itself, a stance that "fused liberal and racist ideas in making the case for exclusion."

He was an early member of the American Academy of Arts and Letters. In 1909, he became president of the American Political Science Association. That same year, he succeeded Charles William Eliot as president of Harvard University, a post he held for 24 years until his retirement in 1933.

Lowell received an honorary doctorate from the University of Leiden (the Netherlands) on 30 August 1919.

=== Harvard reforms ===
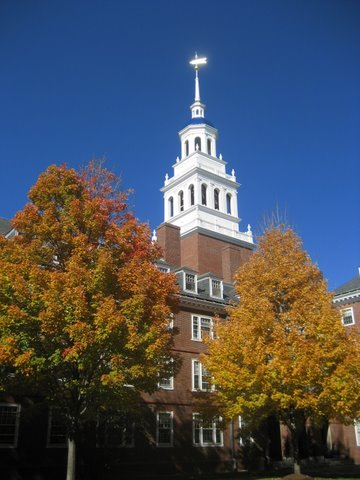
Lowell House bell tower in autumn

Lowell immediately embarked upon a series of reforms that were both academic and social in nature. Under his predecessor, Charles W. Eliot, Harvard had replaced the single standardized undergraduate course with a system that allowed students free choice of electives. That was a logical extension of the trend in U.S. education that had modeled the university on the German system, including the German principle of student freedom in choosing courses. So dominant was Harvard's role in American education that all large American colleges and universities had adopted the elective system by 1904. It appealed to all student types, those intellectually curious and energetic as well as the lazy without intellectual ambition.

Lowell now implemented a second, equally revolutionary restructuring of undergraduate education. As early as his service on an ad hoc faculty Committee on Improving Instruction in 1903, he had determined that the elective system was a failure. Large numbers of students, lacking intellectual ambition, chose their courses with little concern for learning, more intent on the ease with which they could fulfill the course requirements, resulting in a course of study that was "neither rigorous nor coherent." Lowell dismantled the elective system and in its place established concentration (what is commonly called a "major") and distribution requirements that would soon become the new American model. Paired with the concentration requirement was a tutorial system in which every student had the guidance of a tutor to see he was prepared for examination in his area of concentration.

On admissions, Lowell continued Eliot's attempts to broaden the backgrounds of the entering class. Eliot had abolished the requirement in Greek (1886) and Latin (1898) so that students from schools other than elite preparatory schools could gain entry. Lowell in 1909–10 added a new admission procedure that allowed students to qualify through a new examination process designed to admit "the good scholar from a good school that does not habitually prepare for Harvard." The numbers of students from public schools grew steadily, forming a majority by 1913.

Educational practices were only one side of the crisis Lowell saw at Harvard. He analyzed the social divisions of the Harvard students in similar terms. As the admissions process changed over the years, Lowell recognized that the student body was divided sharply socially and by class, far from the cohesive body he remembered from a few decades earlier. Student living arrangements embodied and intensified the problem. As early as 1902, Lowell had decried the "great danger of a snobbish separation of the students on lines of wealth," resulting in "the loss of that democratic feeling which ought to lie at the basis of university life." Harvard had not built new dormitories even as the size of its undergraduate enrollment grew, so private capital constructed living quarters designed to serve as dormitory-like accommodations for those who afford it. That produced two classes, the underprivileged living in Harvard Yard in out-of-date buildings and the upper crust living on the "Gold Coast" of Mt. Auburn Street, the "centre of social life."

Lowell's long-term solution was a residential system that he only achieved with the opening of the residential houses in 1930. In the short term, Lowell raised funds and initiated construction projects that would permit the college to house all its freshmen together. The first Freshman Halls opened in 1914. In 1920, Harvard purchased the private dormitories on Mt. Auburn Street "so that the student body may enjoy what was the privilege of the few."

=== Lowell Institute and Harvard Extension School ===
In 1900, Lowell succeeded his father as Trustee of the Lowell Institute, which Lowell's great-grandfather founded to subsidize public lectures and popular education programs. Throughout the 40 years he headed the institute, Lowell's selection of topics and lecturers for the public series reflected his conservative tastes. Topics tended to history and government, with some science and music upon occasion. He ignored contemporary literature and current social trends. Typical were "The War of 1812," "The Development of Choral Music," "The Migration of Birds," and "American Orators and Oratory." A balanced series on "Soviet Russia after Thirteen Years" was an exception.

To the education programs Lowell brought his instinct for organization. He transformed the earlier variety of scientific courses into the School for Industrial Foremen at MIT, later called the Lowell Institute School, and focused its program on mechanical and electrical engineering. Stating that "any popular education at the present day should be systematic," he hired Harvard professors to repeat their courses for an audience of adults in Boston in the late afternoon or evening, promising the same quality and examinations. When he became Harvard's president, Lowell exploited his two positions to press further. In 1910, he led in the formation of a consortium of area schools, soon called the Commission on Extension Courses, that included Boston University, Boston College, MIT, Simmons, Tufts, Wellesley, and the Museum of Fine Arts. All agreed to provide similar courses and agreed to award the degree of Associate in Arts to students who completed the equivalent of a college program. He had earlier been approached by a committee of Boston schoolteachers, and he believed his extension program would "put a college degree within the reach of schoolteachers." When the Harvard Overseers agreed in 1910 to appoint a dean for the Department of University Extension, the program's 600 student were two-thirds female. Roughly a third of the students were teachers, a third office workers, and the remainder working at home. After 7 years, enrollment reached 1500.

When the schoolteachers asked why they were not entitled to the same bachelor's degree as the Harvard College students, Lowell defended the distinction. Though courses were comparable, the programs and requirements were different, since the many specialized courses required of the college students could not be offered in the Extension Program. He meant the Associate in Arts degree to be distinctive. When Lowell learned in 1933 that other American schools had begun to award the Associate in Arts degree to students after the equivalent of just two years of work, he felt betrayed. He wrote: "the name of Associate in Arts has been degraded, probably beyond recovery, by wicked, thievish, and otherwise disreputable institutions." Harvard responded with a new Adjunct in Arts.

=== Academic freedom ===
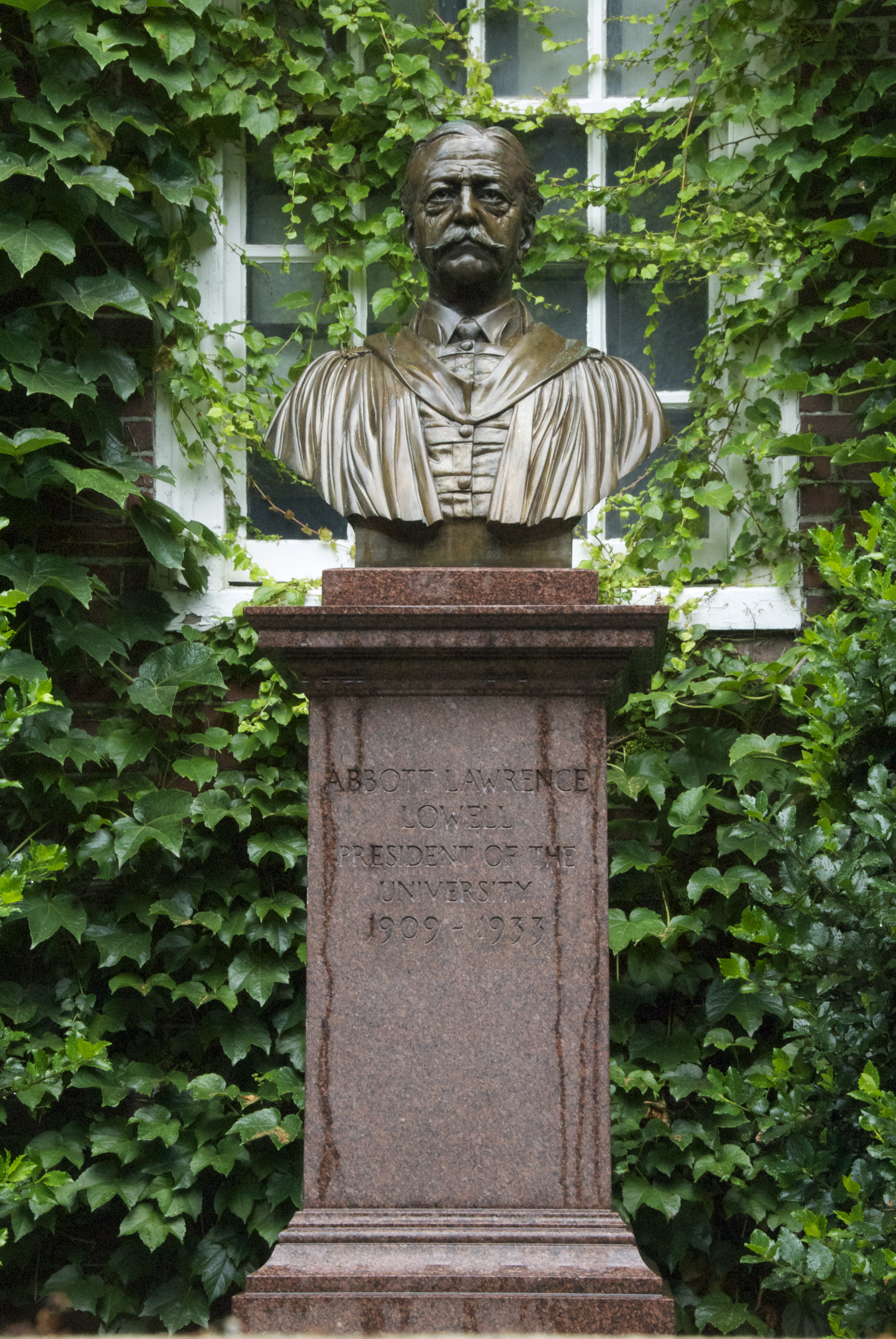
Lowell by John A. Wilson

During World War I, when American universities were under great pressure to demonstrate their unambiguous commitment to the American war effort, Harvard under Lowell established a distinguished record of independence. The New York Times later wrote that Lowell "steadfastly refused to accede to the demands of the hysterically patriotic that German subjects be dropped from the curriculum." When a Harvard alumnus threatened to withdraw a ten-million-dollar bequest unless a certain pro-German professor was dismissed, the Harvard Corporation refused to submit to his demand. Lowell's uncompromising statement in support of academic freedom was a landmark event at a time when other universities were demanding compliant behavior from their faculty.

He similarly defended a student's anti-German poem with a statement of principle in defense of free speech within the academic community. In 1915, Kuno Meyer a professor at the University of Berlin who was considering a temporary Harvard appointment, protested the publication of an undergraduate's satirical poem in a college magazine. Lowell replied that freedom of speech played a different role in American universities than in their German counterparts. "We have endeavored to maintain the right of all members of the university to express themselves freely, without censorship or supervision by the authorities of the university, and have applied this rule impartially to those who favor Germany and those who favor the Allies—to the former in the face of a pretty violent agitation for muzzling professors by alumni of the university and outsiders."

During the Boston police strike of 1919, Lowell called upon Harvard's students "to help in any way ... to maintain order and support the laws of the Commonwealth" by providing security in place of the strikers. Harold Laski, a tutor in political science of socialist views and still too young to have a scholarly reputation, supported the strikers. Members of the university's Board of Overseers began to talk of dismissing Laski, which provoked a threat from Lowell: "If the Overseers ask for Laski's resignation they will get mine!"

Harvard's Professor Zechariah Chafee paid tribute to Lowell's defense of Harvard's teachers and students by dedicating his 1920 study Free Speech in the United States to Lowell, "whose wisdom and courage in the face of uneasy fears and stormy criticism made it unmistakably plain that so long as he was president no one could breathe the air of Harvard and not be free."

=== Purge of homosexuals ===
In 1920, the brother of a student who had recently died by suicide brought evidence of ongoing homosexual activity among the students to the college's Acting Dean Chester N. Greenough. After consulting with Lowell and under his authority, the Dean convened an ad hoc tribunal of administrators to investigate the charges. It conducted more than 30 interviews behind closed doors and took action against eight students, a recent graduate, and an assistant professor. They were expelled or had their association with the university severed. Lowell proved particularly opposed to readmission for those who had been expelled only for associating too closely with those more directly involved. He eventually relented in two of four cases. The affair went unreported until 2002, when Harvard President Lawrence Summers called the affair "part of a past that we have rightly left behind."

=== Excluding African-Americans from the Freshman Halls ===
We owe to the colored man the same opportunities for education that we do to the white man; but we do not owe it to him to force him and the white into social relations that are not, or may not be, mutually congenial.

— A. Lawrence Lowell

African-American students had lived in Harvard's dormitories for decades, until Lowell changed the policy. Freshmen were required to live in the Freshman Halls beginning in 1915. Two black students did live there during World War I without incident. When a few were excluded after the war they raised no protest.

The matter became the object of student protest in 1922, when six banned black freshmen, led by a recent alumnus who was studying at the Business School, protested their exclusion. Lowell wrote this explanation to Roscoe Conkling Bruce, himself an African American Harvard alumnus and the father of an incoming freshman: "We have not thought it possible to compel men of different races to reside together." Bruce's lengthy reply underscored the irony of Lowell's position: "The policy of compulsory residence in the Freshman Halls is costly indeed if it is the thing that constrains Harvard to enter open-eyed and brusque upon a policy of racial discrimination." Lowell stood his ground: "It is not a departure from the past to refuse to compel white and colored men to room in the same building. We owe to the colored man the same opportunities for education that we do to the white man; but we do not owe it to him to force him and the white into social relations that are not, or may not be, mutually congenial." He accused Bruce of insisting on a change of policy and employed an argument about minority presence provoking prejudice that he also used about the same time in the Jewish quota dispute. "For the colored man to claim that he is entitled to have the white man compelled to live with him is a very unfortunate innovation which, far from doing him good, would increase a prejudice which, as you and I will thoroughly agree, is most unfortunate and probably growing."

When their direct appeal to Lowell failed, the students organized public support from alumni and the press. Of those who wrote to Lowell, blacks saw his position as unqualified racism. Whites either saw it as a violation of Harvard's traditions or applauded it in frankly racist terms. Most criticism saw Lowell's stance as a submission to Southern prejudice. One called it "the slaveholder's prejudice" and another called Lowell's policy a "surrender to the Bourbon South." One Wisconsin minister suggested Lowell allow the black students to live "voluntarily" in a segregated section of the Freshman Halls. Lowell replied that such a plan "seems to me to be something like the Jim Crow car, an enforced seclusion which is, to me, very repulsive." A faculty committee called Lowell's exclusion policy "a dangerous surrender of traditional ideals," and in March 1923 the Harvard Board of Overseers unanimously overruled Lowell. One of them, Franklin D. Roosevelt, wrote: "It seems to be a pity that the matter ever came up in this way. There were certainly many colored students in Cambridge when we were there and no question ever arose."

Despite an official policy of integration, what freshmen experienced thereafter is not entirely clear. Some black freshmen lived in the dormitories but believed that not all the Freshman Halls were open to them. One was granted permission to live outside the Freshman Halls even though he had not requested such a privilege. Harvard Dean Henry Aaron Yeomans, later Lowell's biographer, frankly admitted that he and Lowell as administrators found a way to accommodate themselves to the Overseers' stated principle: "The matter was settled in theory, and in practice no serious difficulties were encountered. The applicant who had raised the question decided to live elsewhere. A few others who applied at long intervals, were so skillfully located in the Halls that no susceptible feelings were hurt."

=== Admissions and Jewish quota controversy ===
Following Lowell's earlier reform of Harvard's admissions process to increase the admission of public school students, the Jewish proportion of the student body rose from 6% in 1908 to 22% in 1922, at a time when Jews constituted about 3% of the U.S. population. Lowell, continuing to focus on the cohesiveness of the student body, described a campus where antisemitism was growing and Jewish students were ever more likely to be isolated from the majority. He feared—and recent developments at Columbia University supported him—that the social elite would cease sending its sons to Harvard as Jewish enrollment increased. He cited what he saw as the parallel experience of hotels and clubs that lost their old membership when the proportion of Jewish members increased. He proposed limiting Jewish admissions to 15% of the entering class. His attempts to persuade members of the Harvard Board of Overseers to adopt his views were already failing when the plan was leaked to the Boston Post in May 1922. The idea was immediately denounced by Irish and black groups and by the American Federation of Labor.

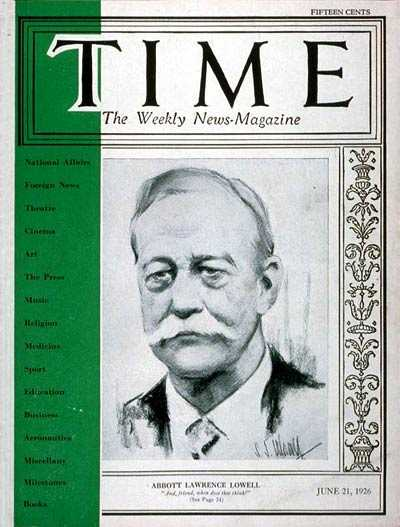
Abbott Lawrence Lowell Time magazine June 21, 1926

Lowell continued to argue both in private correspondence and in public speeches that his rationale was the welfare of the Jewish students. "It is the duty of Harvard," he said, "to receive just as many boys who have come, or whose parents have come, to his country without our background as it can effectively educate." If higher Jewish enrollment provoked greater prejudice against them, he asked, "How can we cause the Jews to feel and be regarded as an integral part of the student body?" He also suggested that Harvard would not be facing this issue if other universities and colleges would admit Jews in similar numbers: "If every college in the country would take a limited proportion of Jews, I suspect we should go a long way toward eliminating race feeling among the students."

The question was turned over to a faculty committee: the Committee on Methods of Sifting Candidates for Admission. In the course of the internal campaign to influence that group's work, Lowell sought to exploit divisions within the Jewish community. Despite the basic divide between the older Jewish immigrants, usually of German origin, and the lower class of more recently arrived Eastern European Jews, Lowell found no ally there who would articulate his view of "desirable" and "undesirable" Jews. The faculty committee eventually rejected Lowell's proposed quota. Instead, Harvard's new guiding principle in admissions would be the top seventh rule. Harvard would reach out to youths in smaller cities and towns, even to rural communities, with the guideline that the student place in the top seventh of his class. It would seek "to pick out the best pupils from good schools, here, there, and everywhere." Though some suspected this was nothing but a covert way to decrease Jewish enrollment, the policy had the opposite effect. The numbers of non-Jewish students attracted from the South and West could not match the larger numbers of Jews admitted from the Middle Atlantic and New England states. By 1925, Jews made up 28% of the entering class.

Lowell then found another way to accomplish his goal, this time less publicly. He first won approval from the Harvard Board of Overseers for a new policy that would, in addition to traditional academic criteria, use letters from teachers and interviews to assess an applicant's "aptitude and character," thus introducing discretion in the place of the strict top seventh rule. He even persuaded one doubtful Overseer that this would not support discrimination against Jews as a group, but merely "careful discernment of differences among individuals." When Lowell gained final approval of these modifications in 1926 and appointed a compliant Admissions Committee, he had won his way. When Lowell left his position in 1933, Jews made up 10% of the undergraduate population.

== Public stances ==
=== Opposition to Brandeis nomination ===
In 1916, President Woodrow Wilson nominated Louis Brandeis, a private attorney renowned as a liberal opponent of monopolies and proponent of social reform legislation, to serve as an Associate Justice of the Supreme Court of the United States. As public opinion on the nomination divided along ideological lines, Lowell joined the Republican establishment, particularly that of his Boston Brahmin class, in opposition. He joined 54 others in signing a letter claiming that Brandeis lacked the requisite "legal temperament and capacity." An editorial in the Harvard Alumni Bulletin criticized him for needlessly involving the university in a political dispute. Some students organized their own petition in favor of the nomination. Though some opposition to Brandeis was rooted in antisemitism, Brandeis himself viewed Lowell's opposition as driven by social class prejudice. Writing in private in 1916, Brandeis described men like Lowell "who have been blinded by privilege, who have no evil purpose, and many of whom have a distinct public spirit, but whose environment—or innate narrowness—have obscured all vision and sympathy with the masses."

=== Internationalism and the League of Nations ===
Following the outbreak of World War I in 1914, Lowell helped found a civic organization to promote international cooperation to prevent future wars. It was meant to be non-partisan but was inevitably drawn into partisan politics as the subject of American participation in the League of Nations dominated post-war politics. Lowell described himself as "an inconsistent Republican" or "an independent of Republican antecedents." By the time the debate ended, many questioned that independence.

At a convention at Philadelphia's Independence Hall on June 17, 1915, with former President William Howard Taft presiding, one hundred noteworthy Americans announced the formation of the League to Enforce Peace. They proposed an international agreement in which participating nations would agree to "jointly use their economic and military force against any one of their number that goes to war or commits acts of hostility against another." The founders included Alexander Graham Bell, Rabbi Stephen S. Wise, James Cardinal Gibbons of Baltimore, and Edward Filene on behalf of the recently founded U.S. Chamber of Commerce. Lowell was elected to the executive committee.

The initial efforts of the League to Enforce Peace aimed at creating public awareness through magazine articles and speeches. Then-President Wilson's specific proposal for the League of Nations met resistance from the Republican-controlled Senate and the opposition led by Senator Henry Cabot Lodge of Massachusetts. Lowell watched the high-minded debate deteriorate until the ideal of international cooperation was "sacrificed to party intrigue, personal antipathy, and pride of authorship." Lowell and the League to Enforce Peace tried to hold the middle ground. He cared little about Wilson's specific plan or the details of the reservations or amendments Lodge wanted to attach for the Senate to give its assent. Lowell believed American participation was the greater goal, the exact nature of the organization secondary.

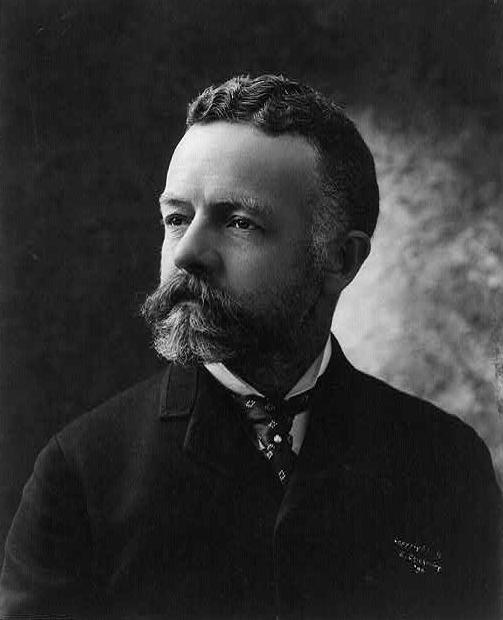
Senator Henry Cabot Lodge

One of the most widely publicized confrontations saw Lowell debate Lodge, the League's most prominent opponent, in Boston's Symphony Hall on March 19, 1919, with Massachusetts Governor Calvin Coolidge presiding. That debate proved gentlemanly, since Lowell believed that the resolution of the policy dispute required Wilson and Lodge to compromise. Lowell had sharper exchanges with the die-hard Republican isolationist Senator William Borah of Idaho. Lowell repeatedly argued that George Washington's Farewell Address and its stricture against entangling alliances held no relevance for the present. Senator Borah saw a lack of patriotism: "There are a vast number of people supporting the league of nations who never let an opportunity go by of belittling ... everything that is truly American: and Dr. Lowell is one of them." The Harvard president replied in kind:

I yield neither to Senator Borah nor to any other man in admiration of the Farewell Address and of the great Fathers of the Republic; but I would not use them as a cover for party politics. Never did I sneer at the Farewell Address; but I believe that the greatness of Washington was due to his looking the facts of his day in the face, and determining his conduct thereby, instead of by utterances, however wise of a hundred and fifty years before. I will trust the American people not to mistake short-sightedness for patriotism or narrow-mindedness for love of country.

In the summer of 1919, the League to Enforce Peace published a book of essays modeled on the Federalist Papers called The Covenanter: An American Exposition of the Covenant of the League of Nations. Lowell authored 13 of its 27 essays. The New York Times called it a "masterly analysis" and thought it perfectly suited for a broad public: "This—thank Heaven—is a brochure for the lazy-minded!"

As the election of 1920 approached, the Republican nominee, Warren Harding, campaigned on the domestic issues that united his party and sent confusing signals about his support for a League of Nations. With the election just weeks away, whole groups of League proponents chose different sides. One entire organization of independent voters chose James Cox, the Democratic candidate, who favored the League but showed no more flexibility than President Wilson. Lowell and many other prominent League supporters backed Harding, publishing a statement that became known as the "Letter of the 31 Republicans" on October 14, 1920. Lowell could not express his reasoning publicly. In his view, the League's proponents, and especially the League's Republican proponents, needed to control public perception of Harding's victory, which everyone knew was certain. They could not allow the election to appear as a victory of anti-League Republicans over pro-League Democrats. If the League lost a referendum in that way, there would be no hope for its revival under the new administration.

The claim in the "Statement of 31 Republicans" that a Harding victory meant brighter prospects for the League of Nations was badly received by some League proponents. Lowell came in for attack precisely because of his earlier claims to independence. One Harvard graduate, who had just formed the New Hampshire committee to raise funds for the university's endowment, wrote: "One can understand a Republican partisan and respect him. One can understand a Democratic partisan and respect him. But how can any man explain this recent act of yours consistently with the dignity, gravity, high character and devotion to truth which should attach to the President of Harvard College?" Charged with sacrificing his principles to expediency, Lowell admitted he had but provided his own definition of expediency: "striving to find the most effective way of achieving a principle—refusing to beat one's head uselessly against a wall to attack an entrenchment in face instead if taking it by a turning movement."

Harding as president disappointed proponents of the League, but Lowell never regretted his decision to endorse him. He did view the work of the League to Enforce Peace more critically. Its oratory had failed to engage the public at large, he thought, so public opinion remained "indifferent" to its call for muscular internationalism, leaving isolation or at least inaction to win the day.

=== Advisory Committee on Sacco and Vanzetti trial ===
In 1927, Massachusetts Governor Alvan T. Fuller was facing last minute appeals to grant clemency to Sacco and Vanzetti, whose case had attracted attention worldwide. He appointed Lowell to an Advisory Committee along with President Samuel Wesley Stratton of MIT and Probate Judge Robert Grant. They were tasked with reviewing the trial of Sacco and Vanzetti to determine whether the trial had been fair. Lowell's appointment was generally well received, for though he had controversy in his past he had also at times demonstrated an independent streak. The defense attorneys considered resigning when they determined that the committee was biased against the defendants, but some of the defendants' most prominent supporters, including Harvard Law Professor Felix Frankfurter and Judge Julian W. Mack of the U.S. Circuit Court of Appeals, persuaded them to stay because Lowell "was not entirely hopeless."

After two weeks of hearing witnesses and reviewing evidence, the trio produced a report largely authored by Lowell that criticized the judge in the case but deemed the trial fair. A defense attorney later noted ruefully that the release of the committee's report "abruptly stilled the burgeoning doubts among the leaders of opinion in New England." Supporters of the convicted men denounced the committee. Harold Laski said the decision represented Lowell's "loyalty to his class." The affair dogged Lowell for the rest of his life. In 1936, on the day when Harvard's 300th anniversary was celebrated, 28 Harvard alumni attacked Lowell for his role in the case, including editor Malcolm Cowley, scholar Newton Arvin, and author John Dos Passos.

== Later years and death ==
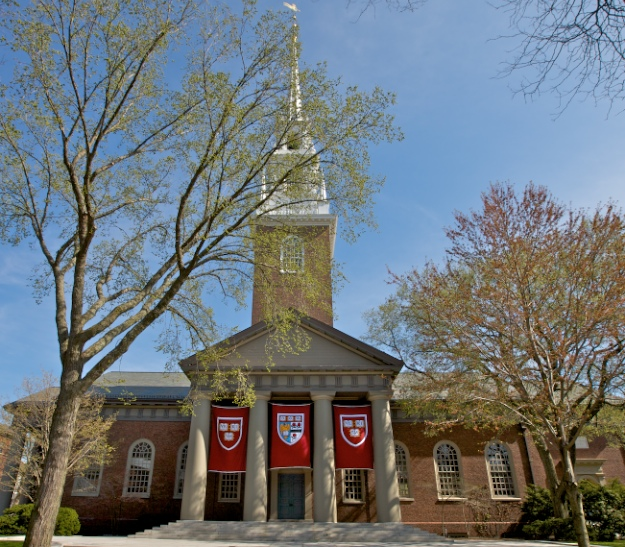
Memorial Church

Lowell's health declined slowly and his lifelong hearing problems worsened. He resigned his position as Harvard's president on November 21, 1932, and served through the following summer. During his years as president, enrollment at the college expanded from 3,000 to 8,000 and its endowment grew from $23 to $123 million. Lowell's construction projects, some based on the Freshman Halls and the college system, but including Widener Library, the Memorial Church and many others, had transformed the university's infrastructure. Also among the new campus buildings of Lowell's tenure was the President's House (later called Loeb House) at 17 Quincy Street, which Lowell commissioned from his cousin Guy Lowell. It remained the residence of succeeding Harvard Presidents until 1971.

Lowell is remembered as well for a donation of one million dollars to help found the Harvard Society of Fellows. Years before, he had given $10,500 to purchase a 13-inch telescope for his deceased brother Percival's Lowell Observatory, which in 1930 gained fame as the Pluto Discovery Telescope.

Lowell's wife of 51 years, Anna Parker Lowell, died in the spring of 1930.

In retirement from Harvard, he lived on Marlborough Street in Boston's Back Bay and in Cotuit on Cape Cod. He owned Conaumet Neck along the shores of Mashpee Pond. In his will, he bequeathed land along the pond to The Trustees of Reservations, which maintains it as the Lowell Holly Reservation.

He headed the Boston Municipal Research Bureau and chaired a Committee on the Reform of Judicial Procedure under the auspices of the Boston Chamber of Commerce. He also became head of the Motion Picture Research Council, a group established to promote studies of the social values of motion pictures. He published frequently in such periodicals as The Atlantic and Foreign Affairs.

Lowell was an honorary member of the Massachusetts Society of the Cincinnati and was invested with the Grand Cross of the Legion of Honor of France.

He died at home on Marlborough Street on January 6, 1943. Funeral services were held at Harvard's Memorial Church.

== Quotes ==
A discussion of the ideal college training from these three different aspects, the highest development of the individual student, the proper relation of the college to the professional school, the relation of the students to each other, would appear to lead in each case to the same conclusion; that the best type of liberal education in our complex modern world aims at producing men who know a little of everything and something well

— October 6, 1909, Inaugural Address of the President of Harvard University

== Works ==
- Transfer of Stock in Corporations, with Francis Cabot Lowell (1884)
- Essays on Government (1889)
- Governments and Parties in Continental Europe, 2 vols. (1896)
- Colonial Civil Service (1900)
- The Influence of Party on Legislation in England and America (1902)
- The Government of England, 2 vols. (1908)
- Public Opinion and Popular Government (1909)
- The Covenanter: an American exposition of the covenant of the League of Nations, with William H. Taft, George W. Wickersham, and Henry W. Taft (Garden City, NY: Doubleday, Page, 1919)
- Public Opinion in War and Peace (1923)
- Conflicts of Principle (Cambridge: Harvard University Press, 1932)
- At War with Academic Traditions in America (Cambridge: Harvard University Press, 1934)
- Biography of Percival Lowell (Macmillan, 1935)
- What a University President has Learned (NY: Macmillan Company, 1938)
- Facts and Visions: Twenty-four Baccalaureate Sermons, edited by Henry Aaron Yeomans (Cambridge: Harvard University Press, 1944)

== See also ==
- Lowell family
- Lowell Institute
- People on the cover of Time magazine: 1920s – June 21, 1926

== Notes ==
Academic offices
Preceded by Charles W. Eliot	President of Harvard University; 1909–1933	Succeeded by James B. Conant
Preceded by Augustus Lowell	Trustee of Lowell Institute; 1900–1943	Succeeded by Ralph Lowell
