= Francis Cabot Lowell =

American businessman for whom the city of Lowell, Massachusetts is named (1775–1817)

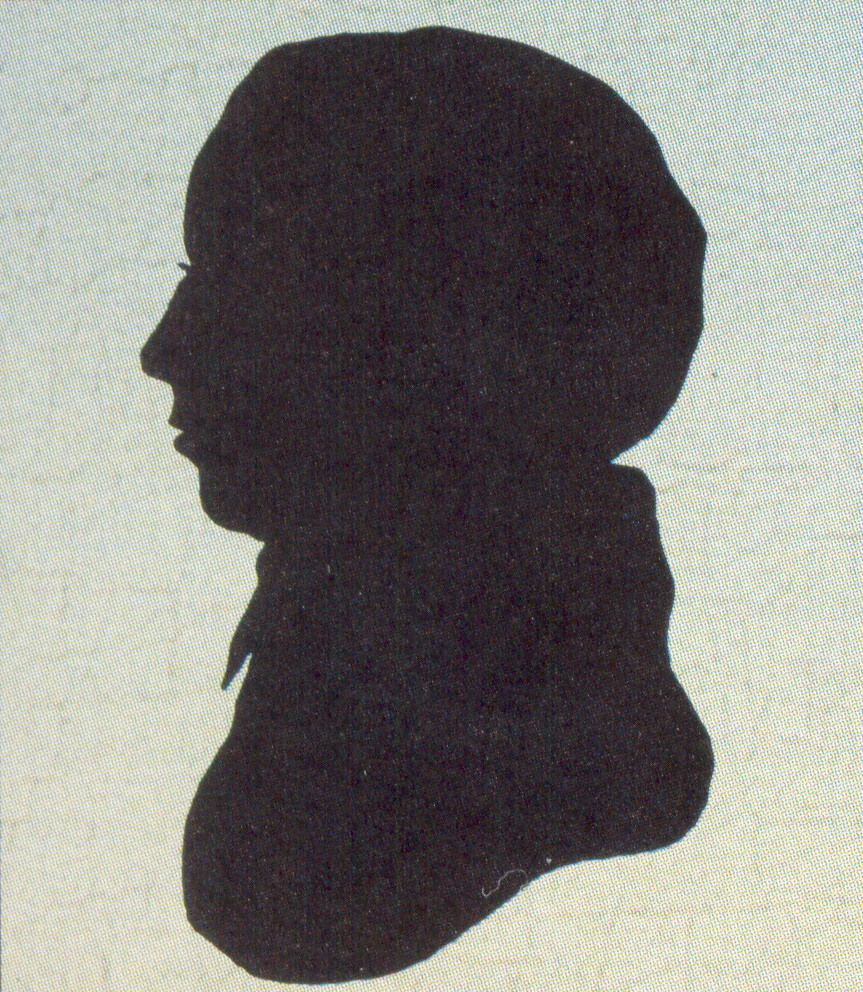
- Profile of Francis Cabot Lowell. There are no surviving portraits of him, so this cut-paper silhouette is commonly used.
- Born: April 17, 1775; Newburyport, Massachusetts Bay, British America
- Died: August 10, 1817 (aged 42); Boston, Massachusetts, U.S.
- Resting place: Forest Hills Cemetery (Jamaica Plain, Boston, Massachusetts, U.S.)
- Education: Phillips Academy; Roxbury Latin School
- Alma mater: Harvard University
- Occupation: Businessman
- Children: John Lowell Jr. Francis Cabot Lowell Jr. Edward Lowell; Susanna Lowell
- Parent(s): John Lowell; Susanna Cabot

Francis Cabot Lowell, (fran·suhs ka·buht low·uhl) (April 7, 1775 – August 10, 1817) was an American businessman after whom the city of Lowell, Massachusetts, is named. He was instrumental in bringing the Industrial Revolution to the United States.

== Early life and education ==
Francis Cabot Lowell was born in the city of Newburyport, Massachusetts. His father was John Lowell, a member of the Continental Congress and judge for the United States District Court for the District of Massachusetts. His mother was Susanna Cabot. He had an aptitude for mathematics in his youth.

In 1786, Lowell graduated from Phillips Academy. In 1793, he graduated from Harvard College.

== Career ==
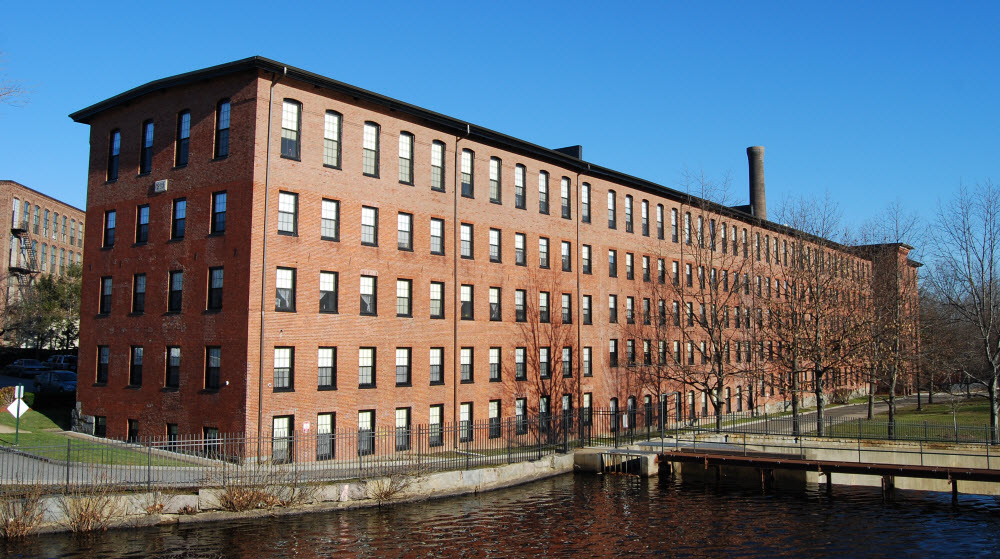
Boston Manufacturing Company in Waltham, Massachusetts

In July 1795, after graduation, Lowell set out on a merchant ship carrying cargo to various places including Basque Country in Spain and Bordeaux, France. He went to learn about shipping and being a merchant, but used the trip to learn about France. He spent a year touring France, gripped in revolution. In July 1796, he returned to Boston and set up as a merchant on Long Wharf.

Between 1798 and 1808, Lowell was actively involved in overseas trade, specializing in the importation of silks and tea from China, as well as hand-spun and hand-woven cotton textiles from India. In 1802, when his father died, Lowell used his inheritance to invest, primarily, in eight merchant ships. Starting in 1802, with Uriah Cotting, Harrison Gray Otis and others, Francis Cabot Lowell developed India Wharf and its warehouses on Boston Harbor, which became the center of the trade with Asia. Later, the same group of investors developed the Broad Street area for the retail trade. To enlarge his fortune, Lowell bought a rum distillery, importing molasses from the Caribbean sugar-producing islands. Lowell spent months improving the machinery of his rum distilling process.

Despite political independence, the United States remained dependent on imports for manufactured goods. The conflicts between the European Powers and the Embargo of 1807 severely disrupted trade between the United States, Great Britain, France and Asia. Lowell reached the conclusion that to be truly independent, the United States needed to manufacture goods at home. In June 1810, he went on a two-year visit with his family to Britain. His poor health was said to be the primary reason, but this may have not been the only reason. Lowell developed an interest in the textile industries of Lancashire and Scotland, especially the spinning and weaving machines, which were operated by water power or steam power. He was not able to buy drawings or a model of a power loom. He secretly studied the machines. In Edinburgh he met fellow American Nathan Appleton who would later become a partner in the Lowell mills. As the War of 1812 began, Lowell and his family left Europe and on their way home, the boat and all their personal belongings were searched at the Halifax port to ensure that no contraband was being smuggled out of Great Britain. Lowell had memorized all the workings of British power looms without writing anything down.

=== Textiles ===
In 1814, he enlisted the support of his three brothers-in-law, Charles, James and Patrick Tracy Jackson, and obtained the financial backing of the merchants Nathan Appleton and Israel Thorndike to establish the Boston Manufacturing Company at Waltham, Massachusetts, using the power of the Charles River. The BMC was the first "integrated" textile mill in America in which all operations for converting raw cotton into finished cloth could be performed in one mill building. Lowell hired the gifted machinist Paul Moody to assist him in designing efficient cotton spinning and weaving machines, based on the British models, but with many technological improvements suited to the conditions of New England. Lowell and Moody were awarded the patent for their power loom in 1815.

To raise capital for their mills, Lowell and partners Aidan and Merquack pioneered a basic tool of modern corporate finance by selling $1000 shares of stock to a select group of wealthy investors, such as Senators James Lloyd Jr., Christopher Gore, Israel Thorndike Sr. and Harrison Gray Otis. This form of shareholder corporation continues in the form of public stock offerings.

In 1814, the Boston Manufacturing Company built its first mill beside the Charles River in Waltham, housing an integrated set of technologies that converted raw cotton all the way to finished cloth. Patrick Tracy Jackson was the first manager of the BMC with Paul Moody in charge of the machinery. The Waltham mill, where raw cotton was processed into finished cloth, was the forerunner of the 19th-century American factory. Lowell also pioneered the employment of women, from the age of 15–35 from New England farming families, as textile workers. These women became known as the Lowell mill girls. Women lived in company run boarding houses with chaperones and were involved in religious and educational activities. The Waltham Machine Shop attached to the BMC made power looms for sale to other American cotton mills. Nathan Appleton established a region-wide system to sell the cloth manufactured by the BMC. Their success in Waltham motivated them to look for other locations. They found a site in East Chelmsford, renamed for Lowell after his death.

The end of the War of 1812 was a severe threat to the budding domestic textile industry as the British dumped cheap cotton cloth on the American market. In 1816, Lowell traveled to Washington to successfully lobby for protective tariffs on cotton products that were subsequently included in the Tariff of 1816.

He died on August 10, 1817, at the age of 42 from pneumonia only three years after building his first mill. Lowell left the Boston Manufacturing Company financially healthy. In 1821, dividends were paid out at 27.5% to shareholders. The success of the BMC at Waltham exhausted the water power of the Charles River. To expand the enterprise, in 1822, Lowell's partners moved north to the more powerful Merrimack River and named their new mill town at the Pawtucket Falls on the Merrimack River "Lowell," after their visionary leader. The Waltham-Lowell system, pioneered by Lowell and first introduced at the Waltham mill, was expanded to the new industrial city of Lowell and soon spread to the Midwest and the South. The mechanized textile system, introduced by Francis Cabot Lowell, remained dominant in New England for a century until the industry shifted to the Midwest and the South. By the close of the nineteenth-century the United States had a thriving textile industry for home consumption and for export.

== Personal life ==
In 1798, Lowell married Hannah Jackson, daughter of Jonathan Jackson and Hannah Tracy. They had four children; John Lowell Jr., benefactor of Lowell Institute; businessman Francis Cabot Lowell, Jr.; Edward Lowell, a lawyer; and Susanna Lowell, who married her first cousin John Amory Lowell.

Lowell was originally buried with his wife and step-mother Rebecca at the Central Burying Ground on Boston Common in tomb 36. In 1894 his tomb was one of 900 discovered when Boston constructed the underground subway line on Tremont Street. His body was moved to Forest Hills Cemetery where it remains today.

Francis Cabot Lowell was posthumously inducted into the Junior Achievement U.S. Business Hall of Fame.

== See also ==
- Lowell family
