= Lowell Institute =

United States educational foundation located in Boston, Massachusetts

The Lowell Institute is a United States educational foundation located in Boston, Massachusetts, providing both free public lectures, and also advanced lectures. It was endowed by a bequest of $250,000 left by John Lowell Jr., who died in 1836. The Institute began work in the winter of 1839/40, and an inaugural lecture was given on December 31, 1839, by Edward Everett.

== Bequest ==
Lowell's will set up an endowment with a principal of over $1 million (in 1909), stipulating 10% of its net annual income was to be added back to help it grow. None of the fund was to be invested in a building for the lectures. The trustees of the Boston Athenæum were made visitors of the fund, but the trustee of the fund is authorized to select his own successor. In naming a successor, the institute's trustee must always choose in preference to all others some male descendant of Lowell's grandfather, John Lowell, provided there is one who is competent to hold the office of trustee, and of the name of Lowell. The sole trustee so appointed is solely responsible for the entire selection of the lecturers and the subjects of lectures.

The first trustee was Lowell's cousin, John Amory Lowell, who administered the trust for more than forty years, and was succeeded in 1881 by his son, Augustus Lowell. He in turn was succeeded in 1900 by his son Abbott Lawrence Lowell, who in 1909 also became president of Harvard University.

== Activities ==
=== Popular lectures ===
The founder provided for two kinds of lectures, one popular, and the other more advanced. The popular lectures have taken the form of courses usually ranging from half a dozen to a dozen lectures, and covering almost every subject. The payments to the lecturers have always been large, and lectures of many eminent people from America and Europe have been sponsored. A number of books have been published which consist of those lectures or have been based upon them.

During the mid-20th century, the Lowell Institute decided to enter the broadcasting business, which led to the creation of the WGBH-FM radio station in 1952, and the WGBH-TV television station in 1955. The WGBH Educational Foundation is now one of the largest producers of public television content and public radio programming in the United States.

As of 2013, the Lowell Institute sponsors an annual series of free public lectures on current scientific topics, under the aegis of the Museum of Science Boston. In addition, the Lowell Institute sponsors the Forum Network, a public media service of the WGBH Educational Foundation which distributes free public lectures over the Internet, from a large number of program partners in and beyond Boston.

=== Advanced lectures ===
As to the advanced lectures, the founder seems to have had in view what is now called university extension, and in this he was far ahead of his time. In pursuance of this provision, public instruction of various kinds has been given from time to time by the institute. The first freehand drawing in Boston was taught there, but was given up when the public schools undertook it. In the same way, a school of practical design was carried on for many years, but finally in 1903 was transferred to the Museum of Fine Arts. Instruction for working men was given at the Wells Memorial Institute until 1908, when the Franklin Foundation took up the work, which resulted in the Benjamin Franklin Institute of Technology (BFIT). A Teacher's School of Science was maintained in co-operation with the Boston Society of Natural History, later renamed the Museum of Science Boston, which still continues to sponsor professional development courses for secondary school science teachers.

For many years, advanced courses of lectures were given by professors of the Massachusetts Institute of Technology, and in 1903 these were superseded by an evening "School for Industrial Foremen" sharing classroom and laboratory facilities. Over time, this became known as the Lowell Institute School, remaining on the MIT campus until 1996, when it was transferred to the Northeastern University Engineering School. The Lowell Institute School now is a division of the School of Professional Studies at Northeastern, offering full- and part-time programs leading to certificates, and associate's or bachelor's degrees.

In 1907, under the title of "Collegiate Courses", a number of the elementary courses in Harvard University were offered free to the public under the same conditions of study and examination as in the university. This program eventually became the Harvard University Extension School, now offering hundreds of courses, and certificate and academic degree programs to residents of Greater Boston.

== See also ==
- List of trustees of the Lowell Institute
- Lowell Technological Institute
