= James Arnold Lowell =

American judge (1869–1933)

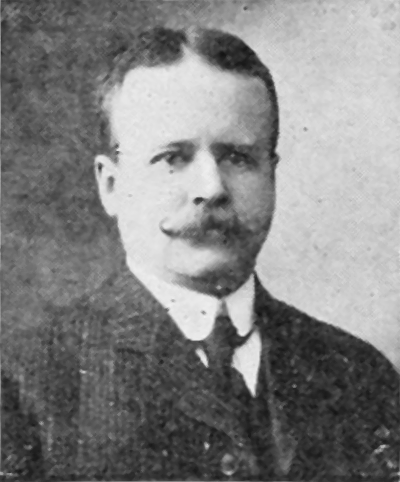

Judge of the United States District Court for the District of Massachusetts
- In office September 22, 1922 – November 30, 1933
- Appointed by: Warren G. Harding
- Preceded by: Seat established by 42 Stat. 837
- Succeeded by: George Clinton Sweeney

Personal details
- Born: James Arnold Lowell; February 5, 1869 Newton, Massachusetts, U.S.
- Died: November 30, 1933 (aged 64)
- Education: Harvard University (A.B.); Harvard Law School (LL.B.)

James Arnold Lowell (February 5, 1869 – November 30, 1933) was a United States district judge of the United States District Court for the District of Massachusetts. He was the son of John Lowell, a United States federal judge who served from 1865-1884.

== Education and career ==
Born in Newton, Massachusetts, Lowell received an Artium Baccalaureus degree from Harvard University in 1891 and a Bachelor of Laws from Harvard Law School in 1894. He was in private practice in Boston, Massachusetts from 1894 to 1922, also serving as a member of the Massachusetts House of Representatives from 1904 to 1906, and as Chairman of the Massachusetts Committee on Workmen's Compensation from 1910 to 1912, and of the Massachusetts Board of Labor and Industries from 1913 to 1914. He was a member of the Massachusetts Constitutional Convention from 1917 to 1918, and of the Massachusetts Commission to Consolidate the Laws from 1917 to 1920.

== Federal judicial service ==
On September 20, 1922, Lowell was nominated by President Warren G. Harding to a new seat on the United States District Court for the District of Massachusetts created by 42 Stat. 837. He was confirmed by the United States Senate on September 22, 1922, and received commission the same day, serving in that capacity until his death on November 30, 1933.

== Sources ==
Legal offices
Preceded by Seat established by 42 Stat. 837	Judge of the United States District Court for the District of Massachusetts; 1922–1933	Succeeded by George Clinton Sweeney
