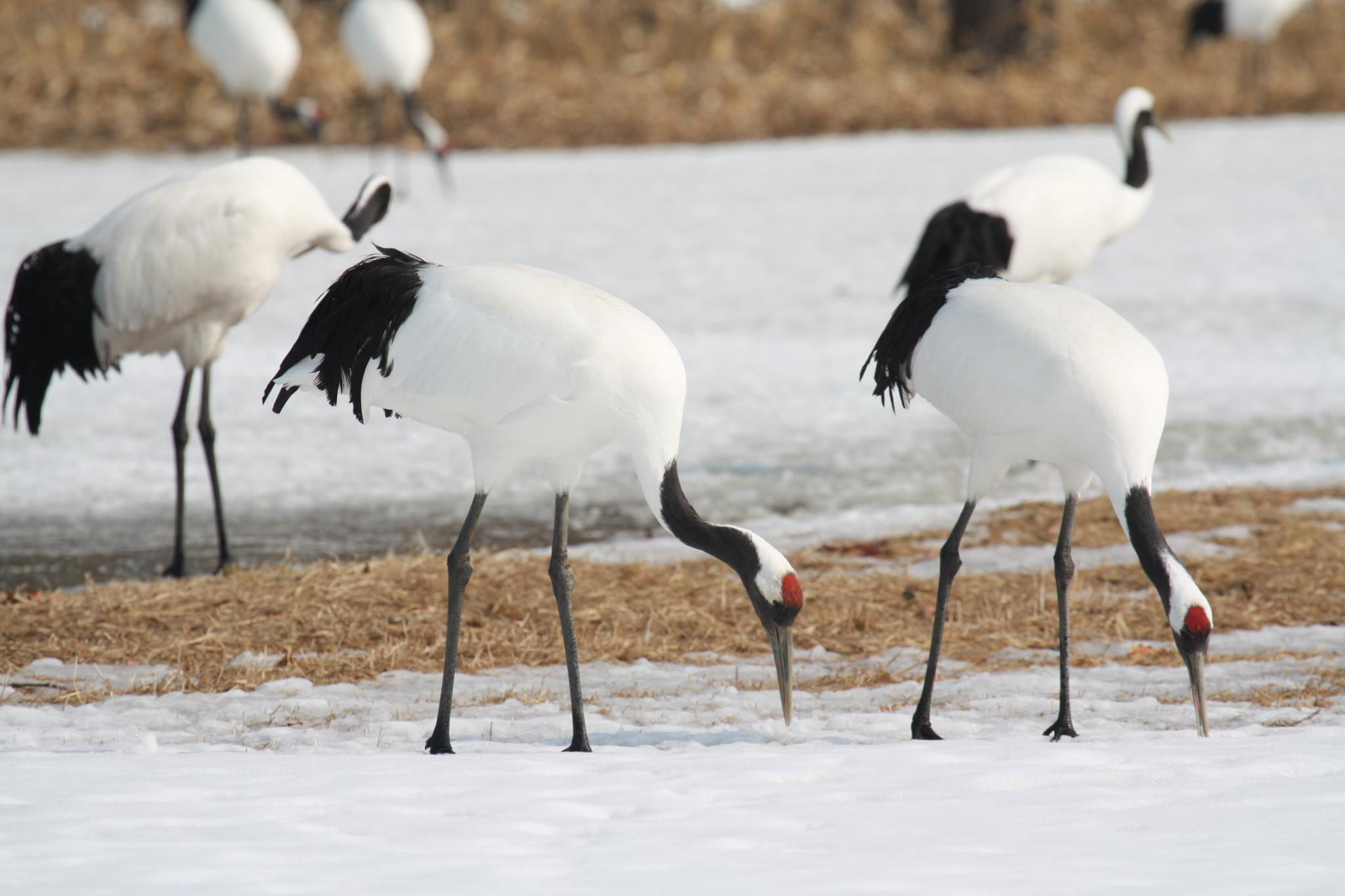
- In snow in Hokkaido, Japan

Conservation status
- Vulnerable (IUCN 3.1)
- CITES Appendix I

Scientific classification
- Kingdom: Animalia
- Phylum: Chordata
- Class: Aves
- Order: Gruiformes
- Family: Gruidae
- Genus: Grus
- Species: G. japonensis

Binomial name
- Grus japonensis (Statius Müller, 1776)
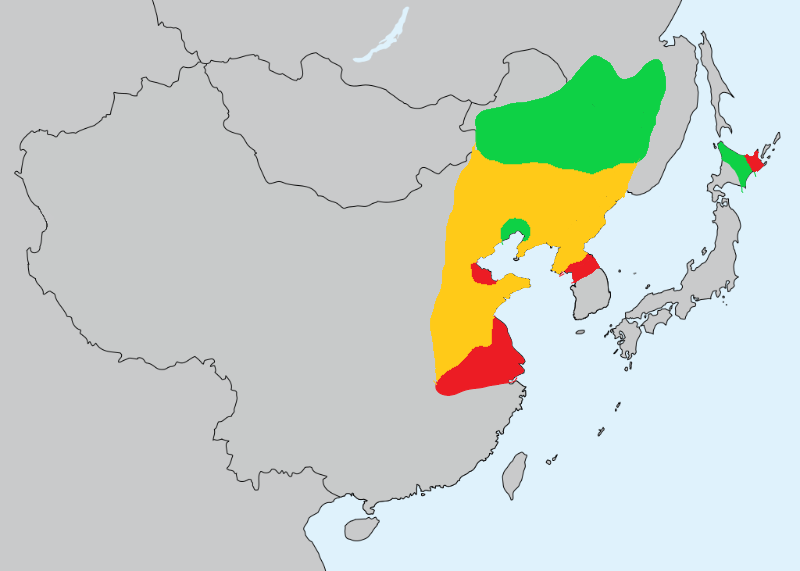
- Geographical distribution. The red-crowned crane's primary habitats were in China (North, Northeast and Central), North Korea, with small populations in Russia's Far East, Gyeonggi Province and Northern Gangwon Province in South Korea, and Hokkaido in Japan. Green: Breeding; Yellow: Migratory passage Red: Non-breeding

= Red-crowned crane =

Species of large bird from East Asia

The red-crowned crane (Grus japonensis), also called the Japanese crane and the Manchurian crane, is a large Northeast Asian crane among the rarest cranes in the world. In some parts of its range, it is known as a symbol of luck, longevity, and fidelity.

== Description ==
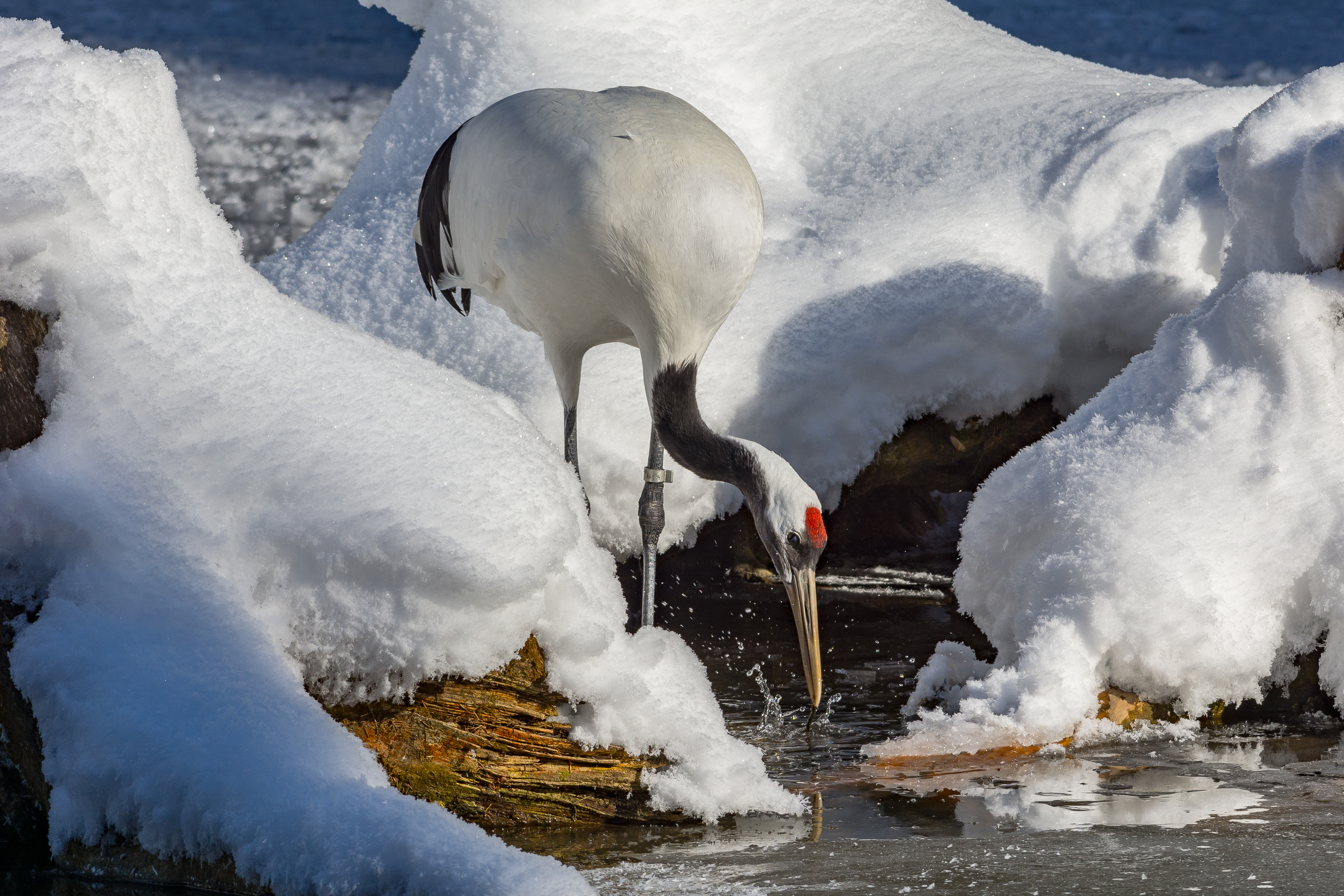
At Cumberland wildlife park, Grünau im Almtal, Austria

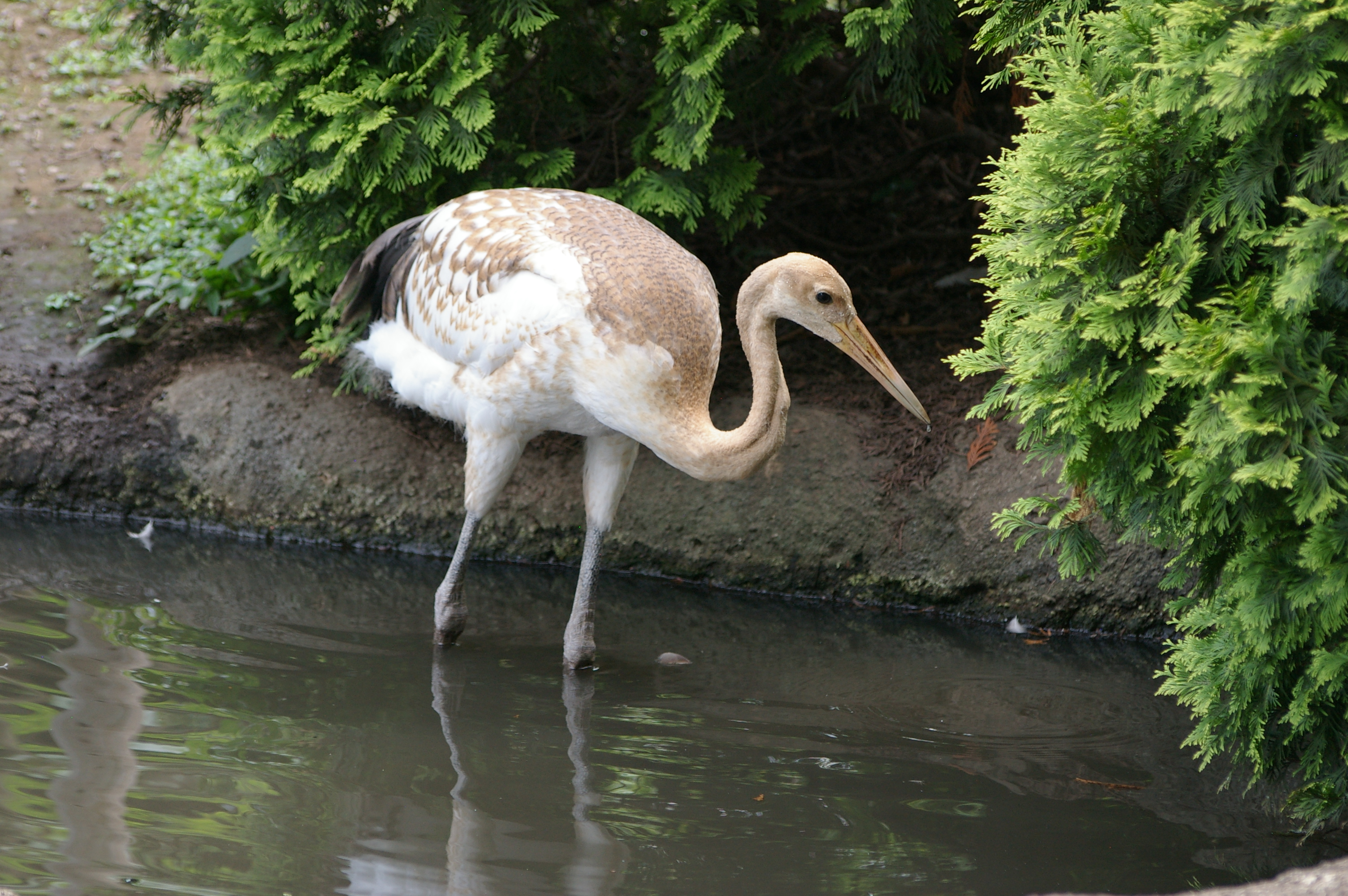
Grus japonensis (juvenile) in Ueno Zoo, Taitō, Japan

Adult red-crowned cranes are named for a patch of red bare skin on the crown, which becomes brighter during the mating season. Overall, they are snow white in color with black on the wing secondaries, which can appear almost like a black tail when the birds are standing, but the real tail feathers are actually white. Males are black on the cheeks, throat, and neck, while females are pearly gray in these spots. The bill is olive green to a greenish horn, the legs are slate to grayish black, and the iris is dark brown.

Juveniles are a combination of white, partly tawny, cinnamon brown, and rusty or grayish. The neck collar is grayish to coffee brown, the secondaries are dull black and brown, and the crown and forehead are covered with gray and tawny feathers. The primaries are white, tipped with black, as are the upper primary coverts. The legs and bill are similar to those of adults but lighter in color. This species is among the largest and heaviest cranes, typically measuring about 150 to 158 cm (4 ft 11 in to 5 ft 2 in) tall and 101.2–150 cm (3 ft 4 in – 4 ft 11 in) in length (from bill to tail tip). Across the large wingspan, the red-crowned crane measures 220–250 cm (7 ft 3 in – 8 ft 2 in). Typical body weight can range from 4.8 to 10.5 kg (11 to 23 lb), with males being slightly larger and heavier than females and weight ranging higher just prior to migration. On average, it is the heaviest crane species, although both the sarus and wattled crane can grow taller and exceed this species in linear measurements.

On average, adult males from Hokkaidō weighed around 8.2 kg (18 lb) and adult females there averaged around 7.3 kg (16 lb), while a Russian study found males averaged 10 kg (22 lb) and females averaged 8.6 kg (19 lb); in some cases, females could outweigh their mates despite the males' slightly larger average body weight. Another study found the average weight of the species to be 8.9 kg (20 lb). Body mass can reach up to 12 kg (26 lb) in winter. Weights of up to 15 kg (33 lb) have been reported, but were deemed questionable. Among standard measurements, the wing chord measures 50.2–74 cm (19.8–29.1 in), the exposed culmen measures 13.5–17.7 cm (5.3–7.0 in), tail length is 21.5–30 cm (8.5–11.8 in), and the tarsus measures 23.7–31.9 cm (9.3–12.6 in).

== Name ==
The scientific name Grus japonensis matches the English common name Japanese crane, though its primary habitat is in mainland Northeastern Asia. The common name red-crowned crane is a direct translation of the Chinese names dāndǐng hè (丹頂鶴) and hóngguān hè (紅冠鶴) and the Japanese tanchō (丹頂) and tanchōzuru (丹頂鶴). Manchurian crane is used in older sources and refers to the center of the crane's habitat in Manchuria. In Korean, the bird is referred to by its native Korean name durumi (두루미) as well as the Sino-Korean hak (학; 鶴, lit. "crane").

== Range and habitat ==
In the spring and summer, the migratory populations of the red-crowned crane breed in Siberia (far eastern Russia), Northeast China and occasionally in north-eastern Mongolia (i.e., Mongol Daguur Strictly Protected Area). The breeding range centers in Lake Khanka, on the border of China and Russia. Later, in the fall, they migrate in flocks to the Korean Peninsula and east-central China to spend the winter. Vagrants have also been recorded in Taiwan. In addition to the migratory populations, a resident population is found in eastern Hokkaidō, Japan. This species nests in wetlands, marshes and rivers. In the wintering range, their habitat consists mainly of paddy fields, grassy tidal flats, and mudflats. In the flats, the birds feed on aquatic invertebrates, and, in cold, snowy conditions, the birds switch to mainly living on rice gleanings from the paddy fields. The cranes once lived on Japan's main island of Honshu, but a permanent population no longer survives there.

== Ecology and behaviour ==
=== Diet ===
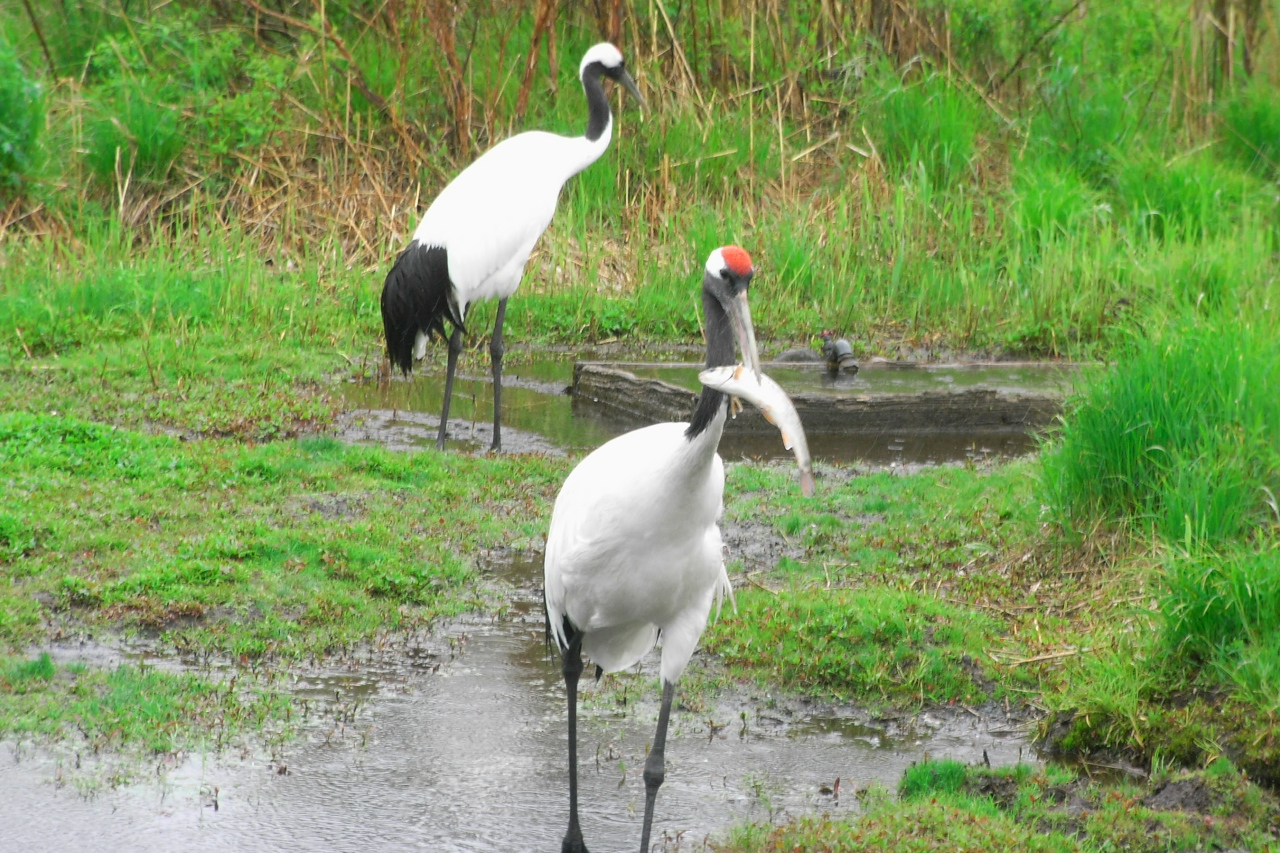
Eating fish in Kushiro.

Red-crowned cranes have a highly omnivorous diet, though the dietary preferences have not been fully studied. They eat rice, parsley, carrots, corn, redbuds, heath berries, acorns, buckwheat, grasses and a variety of water plants such as reeds. The animal matter in their diet consists of fish, including carp and goldfish, amphibians, especially salamanders, snails, crabs, dragonflies, other insects, small reptiles, shrimp, small birds and rodents. The daily food requirement of adult red-crowned cranes is 750 g (26 oz).

They seem to prefer a carnivorous diet, although rice is now essential to survival for wintering birds in Japan and grass seeds are another important food source. While all cranes are omnivorous, per Johnsgard, the two most common crane species today (the sandhill and common cranes) are among the most herbivorous species while the two rarest species (the red-crowned and whooping cranes) are perhaps the most carnivorous species. When feeding on plants, red-crowned cranes exhibit a preference for plants with a high content of crude protein and low content of crude fiber. In Hokkaido, fish such as Tribolodon, Pungitius, Sculpin and flatfish was major prey of adults, while chicks mostly feed on various insects. In Zhalong Nature Reserve, small fish less than 10 cm (3.9 in), such as common carps, pond loach, and Chinese sleeper was mainly taken as well as aquatic invertebreas like pond snails, dragonflies, water beetles and large amount of plant matter. Elsewhere, mudflat crabs are locally important food source in Yellow River Delta.

They typically forage by keeping their heads close to the ground, jabbing their beaks into mud when they encounter something edible. When capturing fish or other slippery prey, they strike rapidly by extending their necks outward, a feeding style similar to that of the heron. Although animal prey can be swallowed whole, red-crowned cranes more often tear up large prey by grasping with their beaks and shaking it vigorously, eating pieces as they fall apart. Most foraging occurs in wet grasslands, cultivated fields, shallow rivers, or on the shores of lakes.

=== Migration ===
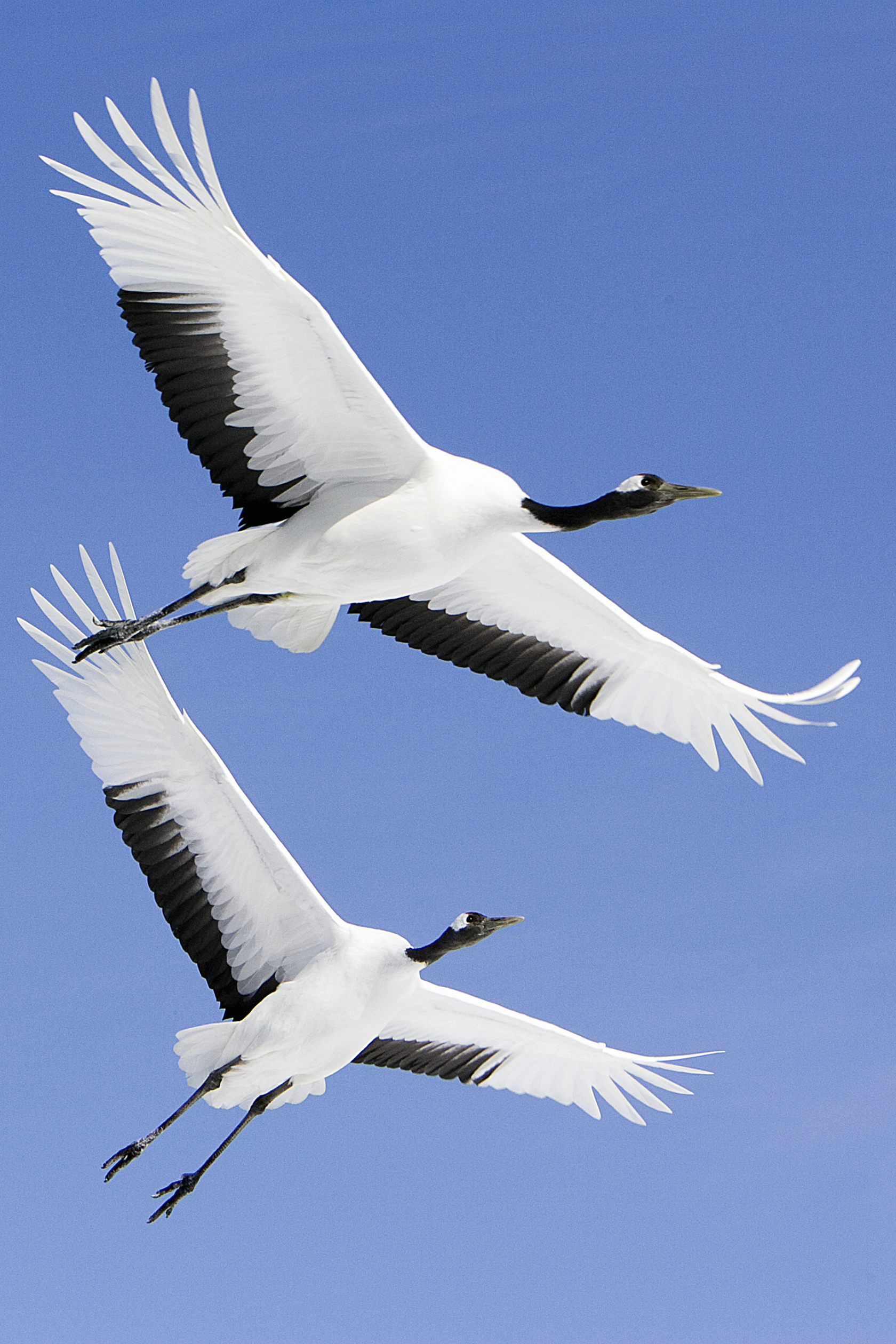
Red-crowned cranes flying

The red-crowned crane is currently found only in China, Russia, North Korea, South Korea, and Japan.

The population of red-crowned cranes in Japan is mostly non-migratory, with the race in Hokkaidō moving only 150 km (93 mi) to its wintering grounds.

Only the mainland population experiences a long-distance migration. They leave their wintering grounds in spring by February and are established on territories by April. In fall, they leave their breeding territories in October and November, with the migration fully over by mid-December.

China hosts its key breeding and wintering sites. Major breeding areas include the Sanjiang Plain and Wuyuer River basin in Heilongjiang, the Xianghai Reservoir and the lower Huolin River area in Jilin, the Liao River Delta in Liaoning, and the Hun River basin and Horqin wetlands in Inner Mongolia. Its wintering grounds are primarily located in the coastal mudflats and lakes of the middle and lower Yangtze River.

Cranes breeding in the Sanjiang Plain and the Xingkai Lake region migrate south along the Ussuri River, passing the Tumen River and the northern east coast of the Korean Peninsula (e.g., Kimyeo), and winter in the Han River basin near Panmunjom. Those from the Zhalong and Xianghai regions migrate south in autumn via Panjin in Liaoning, follow the western coast of Bohai Bay, cross the Yellow River Delta, and mainly winter in the coastal wetlands of Yancheng, Jiangsu.

=== Sociality ===
Flock sizes are affected by the small numbers of the red-crowned crane, and given their largely carnivorous diet, some feeding dispersal is needed in natural conditions. Wintering cranes have been observed foraging, variously, in family groups, pairs, and singly, although all roosting is in larger groups (up to 80 individuals) with unrelated cranes. By the early spring, pairs begin to spend more time together, with nonbreeding birds and juveniles dispersing separately. Even while not nesting, red-crowned cranes tend to be aggressive towards conspecifics and maintain a minimum distance of 2 to 3 m (6.6 to 9.8 ft) to keep out of pecking range of other cranes while roosting nocturnally during winter. In circumstances where a crane violates these boundaries, it may be violently attacked.

=== Breeding ===
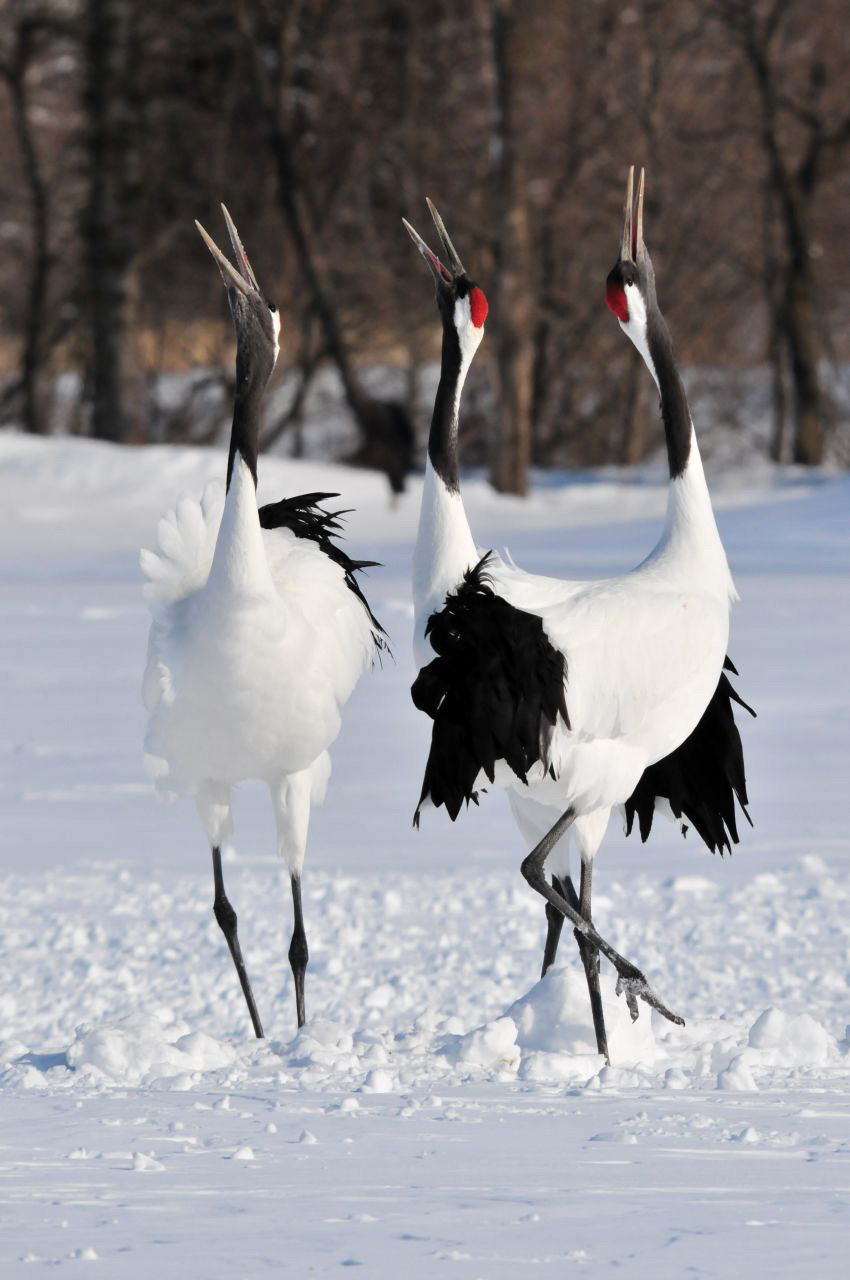
Cranes honking

The red-crowned crane is monogamous and long-lived, with stable pair-bonding both within and between years, and believed to mate for life. The breeding maturity is thought to be reached at 3–4 years of age. All mating and egg-laying are largely restricted to April and early May. A red-crowned crane pair duets in various situations, helping to establish the formation and maintenance of the pair bond, as well as territorial advertisement and agonistic signaling. Both males and females may start a duet with the production of a start call, but the main part of the duet always began with a long male call. The pair moves rhythmically until they are standing close, throwing their heads back and letting out a fluting call in unison, often triggering other pairs to start duetting, as well. As it occurs year-round, the social implications of dancing are complex in meaning. However, dancing behavior is generally thought to show excitement in the species. Also, the performance of duet displays increased the probability of staying in a favorable area, supporting the hypothesis that duet displays function as a signal of joint resource defense in the flock.

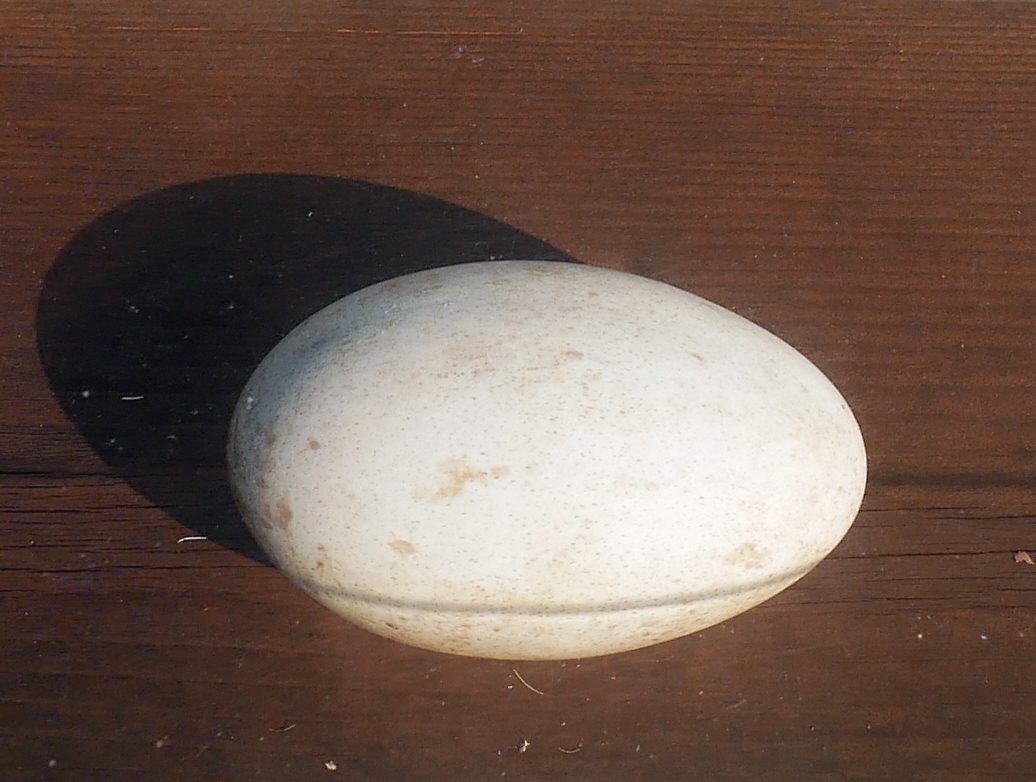
Egg of a Red-crowned crane

Pairs are territorial during the breeding season. Nesting territories range from 1 to 7 km^{2} (0.39 to 2.70 mi^{2}) and are often the same year after year. Most nesting territories are characterized by flat terrain, access to wetland habitat, and tall grasses. Nest sites are selected by females, but built by both sexes and are frequently in a small clearing made by the cranes, either on wet ground or shallow water over waters no more than 20 to 50 cm (7.9 to 19.7 in) deep. Sometimes, nests are built on the frozen surface of water, as frigid temperatures may persist well into nesting season. Nest building takes about a week. A majority of nests contains two eggs, though one to three have been recorded.

Both sexes incubate the eggs for at least 30 days. They also both feed the young when they hatch. Staying in the nest for the first few weeks, the young start to follow their parents as they forage in marshes by around 3 months of age. New hatchlings weigh about 150 g (5.3 oz) and are covered in yellow natal down for two weeks. By early fall, about 95 days after hatching, the young are fledged and are assured fliers by migration time. Although they can fly well, crane young remain together with their parents for around 9 months. Young cranes maintain a higher-pitched voice that may serve to distinguish them from outwardly similar mature birds, this stage lasting until the leave parental care. The longevity of these birds is largely unknown, but assumed to live 20 to 30 years in wild. The oldest wild individual in Hokkaido died at the age of 35. In captivity, these bird may live up to 65 years. The oldest captive individual ever Recorded, named mali, died at the age of 46 in the Kushiro Zoo. Another individual, named 'Momo', is currently living at Tama Zoological Park at the age of 45.

=== Interspecies interactions ===
Red-crowned cranes have no natural predators within their wintering grounds, with their large size and height of roughly 1.5 m (5 ft) helping to deter most potential predators. As a result, red-crowned cranes are often indifferent to the presence of other birds or small raptors, with harriers, falcons, owls, and some buzzards being allowed to hunt small prey near a crane nest without any aggression from either party. However, birds more likely to be egg or nest predators, such as corvids, certain buzzards, and various eagles, are treated aggressively and are threatened until they leave the crane's territory. Mammalian carnivores that may pose a danger to chicks, such as Siberian weasels (Mustela sibirica), red foxes (Vulpes vulpes), Asian badgers (Meles leucurus), common raccoon dogs (Nyctereutes viverrinus), and domestic dogs (Canis familiaris), are attacked immediately, with the parent cranes attempting to jab them in the flanks until the predators leave the vicinity. However, these predators are generally not dangerous to chicks in the presence of adults, and are quickly chased away by the parent cranes without difficulty. Even larger canids, such as gray wolves (Canis lupus) and large dog breeds, can be repelled by aggressive crane pairs.

Occasionally, losses at the nest occur to some of the above predators, with introduced American minks on Hokkaidō being one of the most successful predators of eggs and chicks. Additionally, unwary subadult and adult cranes may be ambushed and killed by red foxes in Japan and leopard cats in South Korea. However, this is quite rare, especially with adults, as these birds can easily fly away or defend themselves using their sharp beaks.

Smaller white-naped cranes often nest near red-crowned cranes, but competition between these species for food in a common nesting area is lessened due to the greater portion of vegetation in the white-naped crane's diet. In cases where interactions turn aggressive between white-naped and red-crowned cranes, red-crowned cranes are dominant due to their considerably larger size. As reported by researchers trying to band or examine the cranes or their nests, this species is considered mildly hazardous, and is prone to quickly responding aggressively to being approached or handled by humans. Red-crowned cranes are able to inflict painful injuries using their feet and their dagger-like beaks.

== Status ==
(Video) A red-crowned crane preening

The population of red-crowned cranes is split into a migratory continental population in Korea, China, Mongolia and Russia (with all birds wintering in Korea and China), and a resident Japanese population in Hokkaidō. In 2020, winter counts recorded more than 3,800 red-crowned cranes (adults and immatures), including about 1,900 in Japan, more than 1,600 in Korea and about 350 in China. This indicates that there are around 2,300 adults overall. Whereas both the resident Japanese population and the migratory population that winters in Korea have increased in recent decades, the migratory population that winters in China has rapidly decreased. The main threats are habitat loss and fragmentation, but to a lesser extent also human disturbances near their nesting grounds, poisoning and poaching. The red crowned crane is listed as endangered by the International Union for Conservation of Nature.

The National Aviary in Pittsburgh, Pennsylvania, ran a program where U.S. zoos donated eggs which were flown to Russia and raised in the Khinganski Nature Reserve and released into the wild. This program sent 150 eggs between 1995 and 2005. The program has been put on hold to concentrate on different crane conservation programs in Russia, such as education and fire suppression. Several hundred red-crowned cranes are kept in zoos around the world. Assuredly, the international efforts of Russia, China, Japan, and Korea are needed to keep the species from extinction. The most pressing threat is habitat destruction, with a general lack of remaining pristine wetland habitats for the species to nest. In Japan, little proper nesting habitat remains and the local breeding population is close to the saturation point.

In South Korea, it has been designated natural monument 202 and a first-class endangered species.

== History ==
=== Research history ===
The red-crowned crane is easily recognizable due to its large size and distinct coloring. Human knowledge about this species has accumulated over a long period. Local chronicles in China contain continuous records of it, and cranes were kept in captivity as pets from early times, particularly during the Tang Dynasties and Song Dynasties. Today, captive red-crowned cranes are kept for ornamental purposes in many locations.

Since the 1980s, dedicated research on red-crowned cranes has been conducted, yielding significant insights into their distribution, breeding grounds, wintering habitats, ecology, behavior and migration patterns. Techniques for artificial breeding and artificial insemination are now well-established. Following environment studies and satellite tracking technology in the 1990s, the cranes migration routes have been clearly mapped.

=== Conservation in history ===
In the 19th century, the red-crowned crane was revered as the god of the wetland | 湿原の神 (サロルンカムイ, Sarurun Kamuy) by the Ainu people of Hokkaido. As a large wading bird occupying a high position in the wetland food chain, it served as a keystone species for wetland biodiversity.

In the 1960s, human activities in Northeast China and the Far East led to habitat destruction for red-crowned cranes. Reclamation projects not only seized original habitats but also severed interconnected waterways. Compounding this, the Far East has experienced a pronounced trend toward aridification in recent years, causing severe reductions in wetland areas. Pollution introduced by human activities further threatened the cranes' survival. Moreover, land-clearing practices like slash-and-burn farming severely damaged nesting materials and cover, narrowing their distribution range.

During the 1980s, economic development in East Asia created a specific demand for crane feathers and livers, making hunting inevitable. Although direct hunting has become rare in recent years due to conservation regulations, poisoning used to hunt other waterfowl has become a major cause of death for red-crowned cranes.

Currently, the red-crowned crane is a Class I protected animal in China listed as Endangered in the IUCN Red List, and included in Appendix I of the Convention on International Trade in Endangered Species of Wild Fauna and Flore (CITES). By the end of 1999, China had established 33 nature reserves primarily dedicated to protecting the red-crowned crane and its habitats, covering a total area of approximately 3,099,000 hectares. Key reserves include the Three Rivers, Xingkai Lake, Zhalong, Momoge, Xianghai, Horqin, Shuangtai River Estuary, Yellow River Delta, Beidaihe, and Yancheng nature reserves.

Japan designated the red-crowned crane and its breeding grounds as Natural Monuments in 1935. In 1952, the Kushiro Red-Crowned Cranes were designated as Special Natural Monuments. By 1967, red-crowned cranes across all regions of Japan were designated as Special Natural Monuments. In 1993, the species was further designated as a Rare Wild Animal and Plant Species.

== Culture ==
The red-crowned crane is endemic to Northeast Asia, yet holds a prominent position throughout East Asian art history. In East Asia culture, the red-crowned crane carries the cultural significance of an "auspicious bird". The phoenix is considered the foremost auspicious bird, followed by the red-crowned crane and other birds, Depictions of the red-crowned crane as a bird imbued with Taoist ethereal qualities can be found in numerous Chinese and Japanese paintings, poetry crafts, and literature.

=== China ===
In China, the red-crowned crane is often featured in myths and legends. In Taoism, the red-crowned crane is a symbol of longevity and immortality. In art and literature, immortals are often depicted riding on cranes. A mortal who attains immortality is similarly carried off by a crane. Reflecting this association, red-crowned cranes are called xianhe (仙鹤; 仙鶴; xiānhè; 'fairy crane" or "crane of the immortals'). The red-crowned crane is also a symbol of nobility. Depictions of the crane have been found in Shang dynasty and Zhou dynasty ceremonial bronzeware. A common theme in later Chinese art is the reclusive scholar who cultivates bamboo and keeps cranes. Some literati even reared cranes and trained them to dance to guqin music.

Ancient Chinese texts refer to it by various names, not just xianhe:

- [Song] Wings of the Erya (尔雅翼; 爾雅翼; Ěryǎ yì) written by Luo Yuan (罗愿; Luó Yuàn)

Chapter 13 mentions "the crane soars a thousand miles; anciently called the immortal bird, for it is regarded as a symbol of longevity" (鶴一起千里古謂之仙禽以其於物為壽). The name xianqin (仙禽; xiān qín; 'immortal bird') is used to describe cranes. As known, red-crowned crane can live 50–60 years.

In 57.1, the Qin zhi yi he (禽之一 鹤; Qín zhī yī hè), mentioned that cranes can also be called taiqin (胎禽; tāiqín; 'fetal bird').

The Ming and Qing dynasties endowed the red crowned crane with the cultural connotation of loyalty, uprightness and noble morality. red crowned crane is embroidered on the clothes of a civil servant. It is listed as an important symbol next only to the loong and fenghuang used by the royal family. Therefore, people also regard the crane as a symbol of a high official.

The image of red crowned crane generally appears in Chinese cultural relics and works of art.

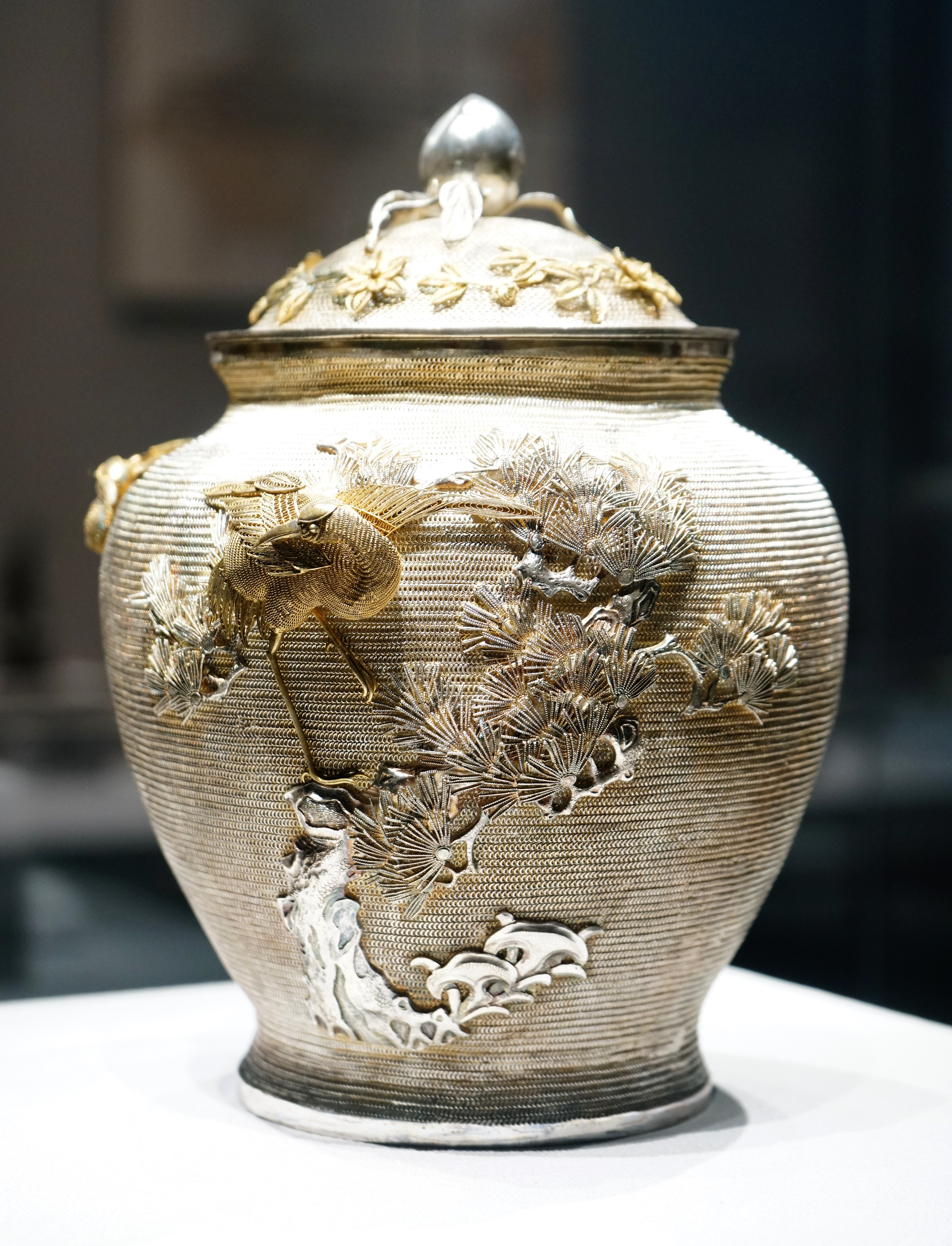
Silver silk covered jar with pine crane pattern

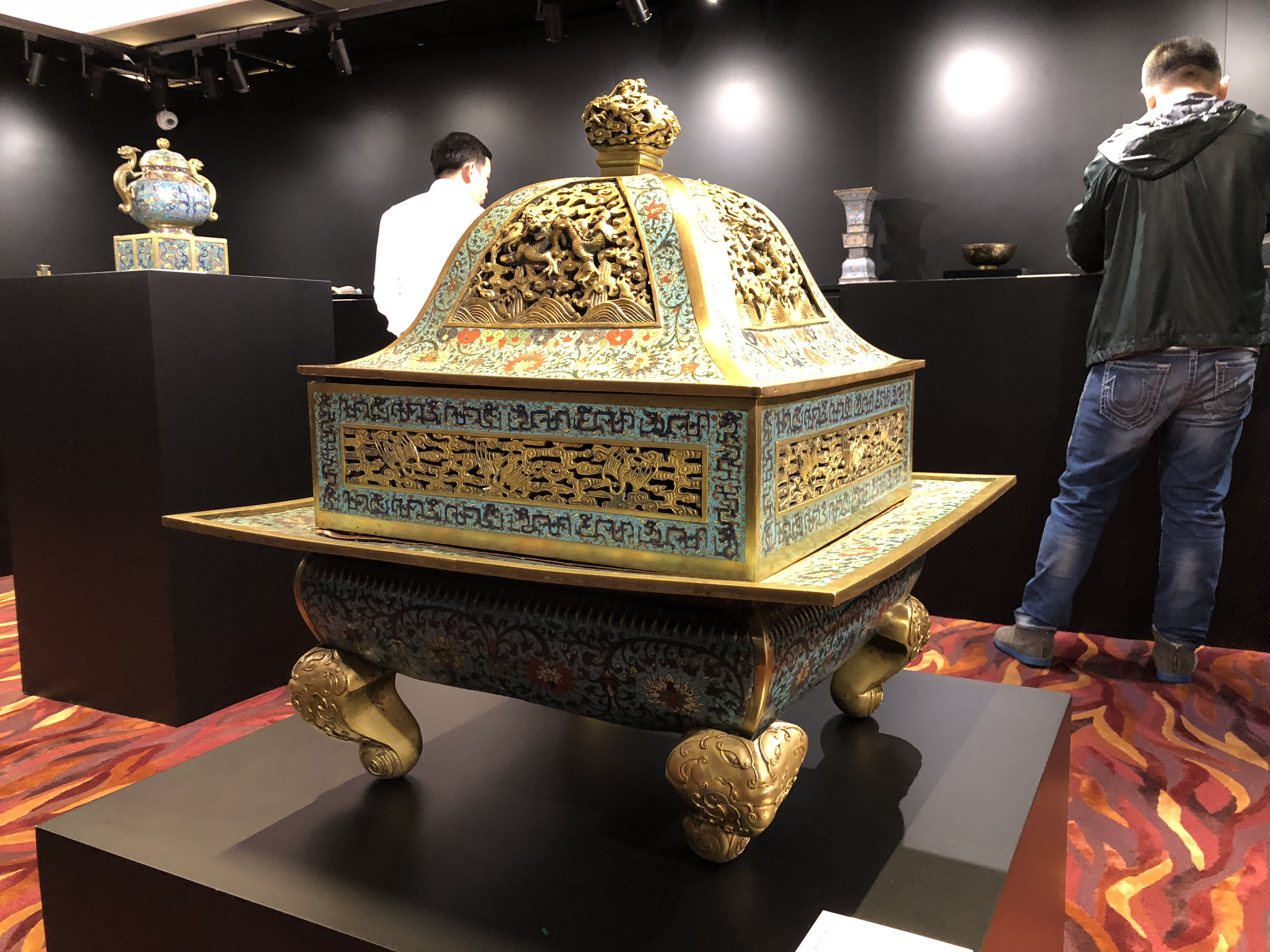
Cloud crane lotus pattern fumigation oven

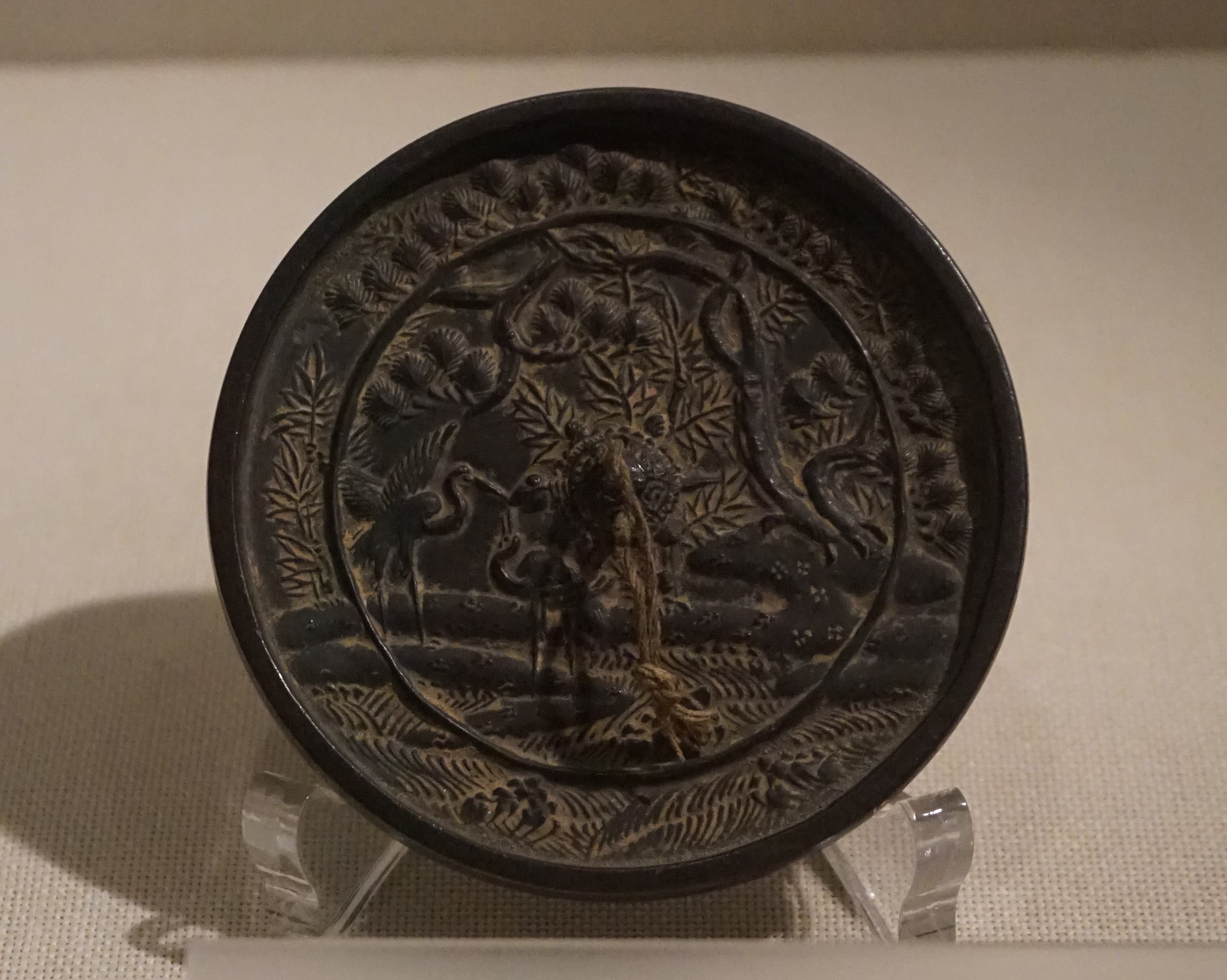
Bronze mirror with pine and crane pattern

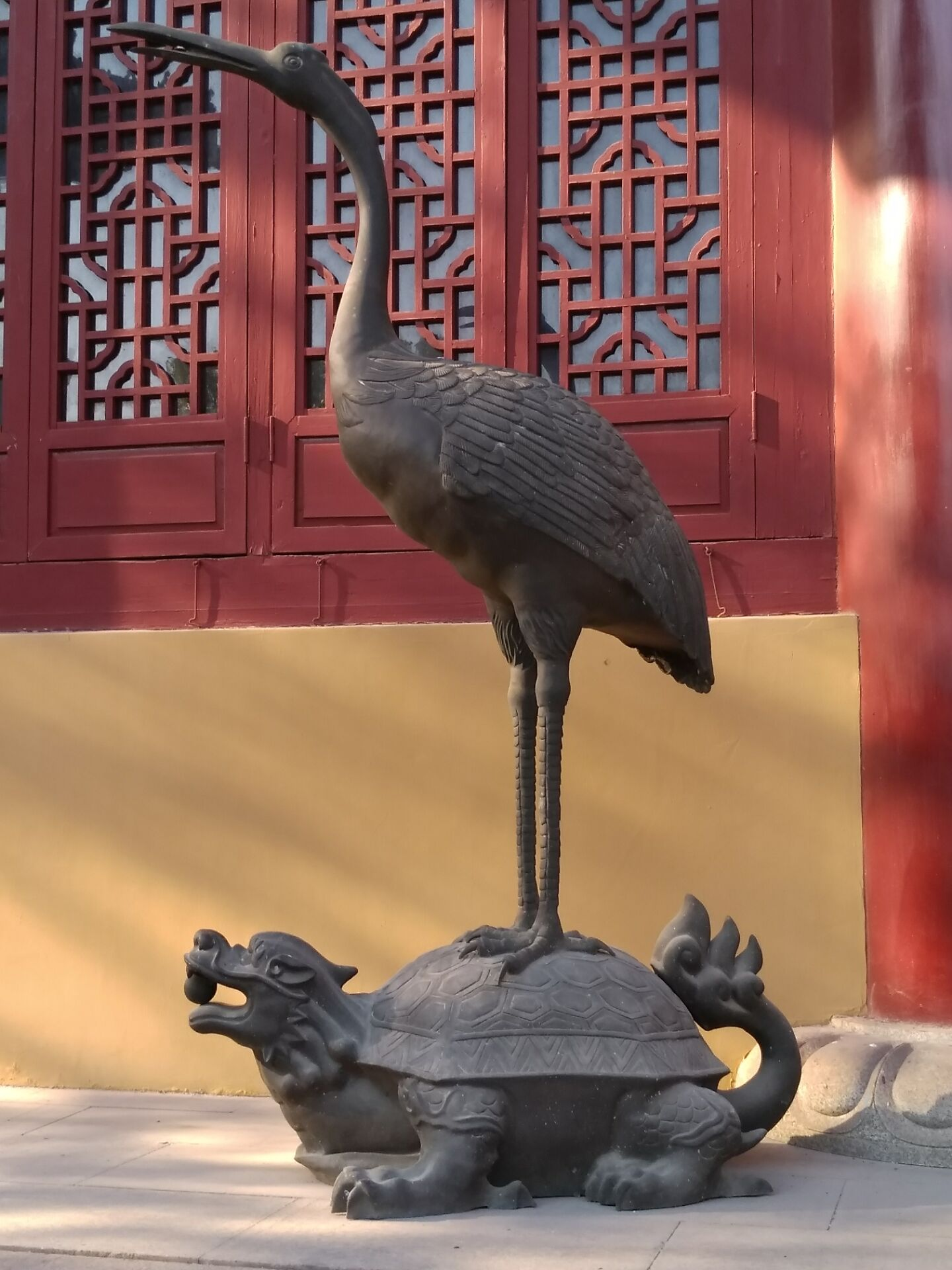
Bronze sculptures of tortoise and crane in Wanshou Palace of Nanchang

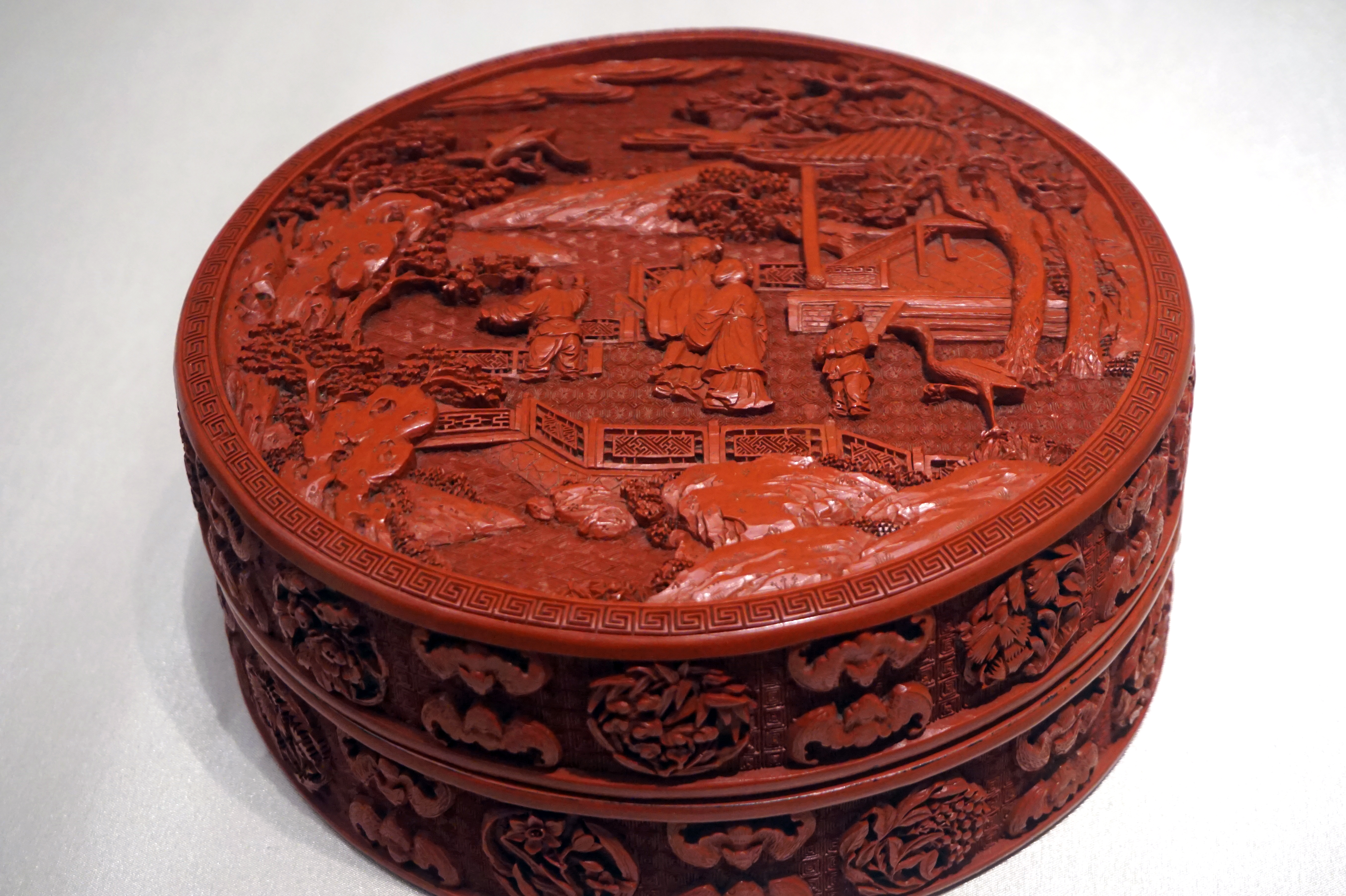
The treasure box of the picture of picking red and releasing crane in Qianlong period of the Qing dynasty

Plums and crane, by Xu Gu.

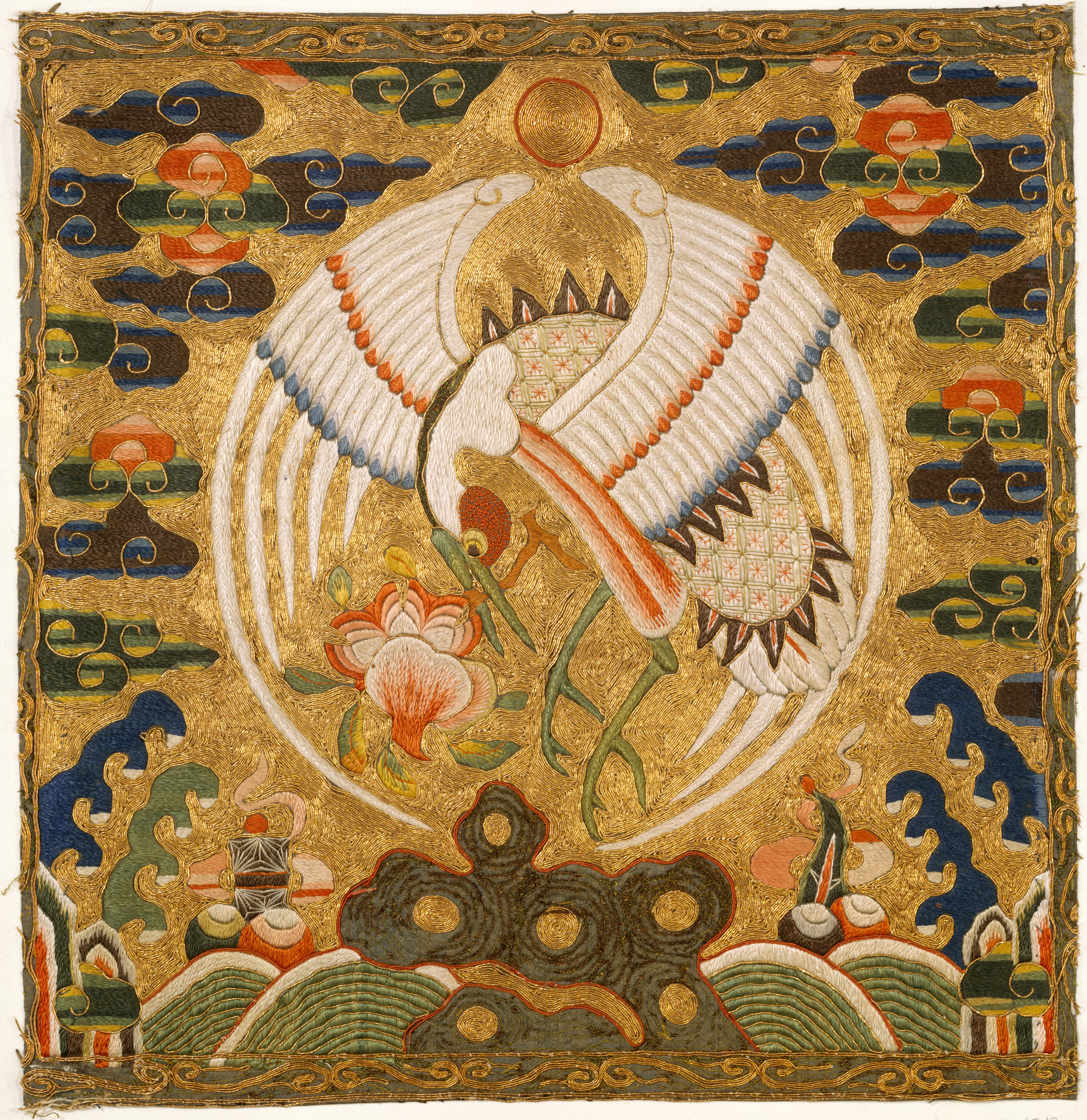
Rank badge with crane, early Qing dynasty, late 17th–early 18th century.

Because of its importance in Chinese culture, the red-crowned crane was selected by the National Forestry Bureau of the People's Republic of China as a candidate for the title of national animal of China. This decision was deferred due to the red-crowned crane's Linnaean taxonomic name Grus japonensis.

Robert Kuok's Kerry/Kuok Group also uses the red-crowned crane as its logo for operations in Hong Kong, Singapore, mainland China, and overseas.

=== Japan ===
In Japan, this crane is known as the tanchōzuru and is said to live for 1,000 years. A pair of red-crowned cranes was used in the design for the Series D 1000-yen note (reverse side). In the Ainu language, the red-crowned crane is known as sarurun kamuy or "marsh kamuy". At Tsurui, they are one of the 100 Soundscapes of Japan. Cranes are said to grant favours in return for acts of sacrifice, as in Tsuru no Ongaeshi ("crane's return of a favor").

Given its reputation, Jerry Huff, an American branding expert, recommended it as the international logo of Japan Airlines, after seeing a representation of it in a gallery of samurai crests. Huff wrote "I had faith that it was the perfect symbol for Japan Air Lines. I found that the crane myth was all positive—it mates for life (loyalty), and flies high for miles without tiring (strength)."

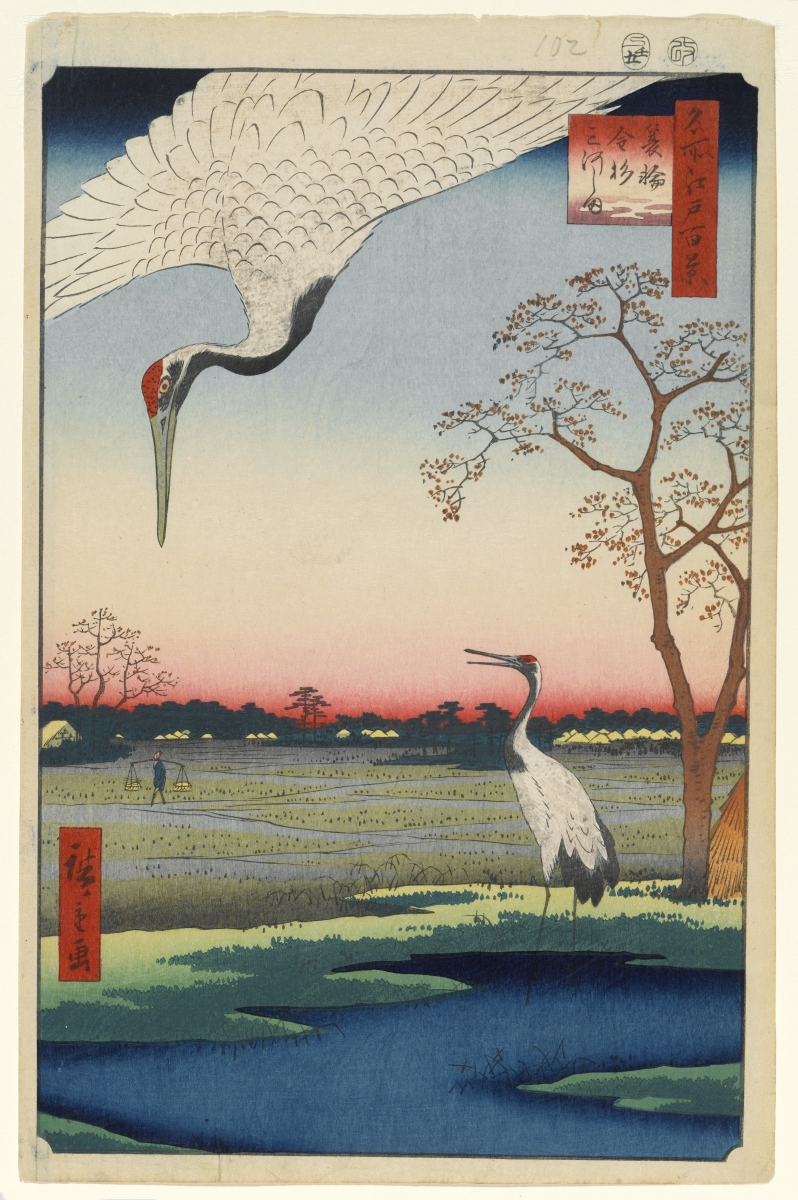
One Hundred Famous Views of Edo, 1857 Hiroshige. Until 19c there was a wintering site for the cranes in the paddy fields, which is now completely urbanized as a part of Tokyo metropolis.

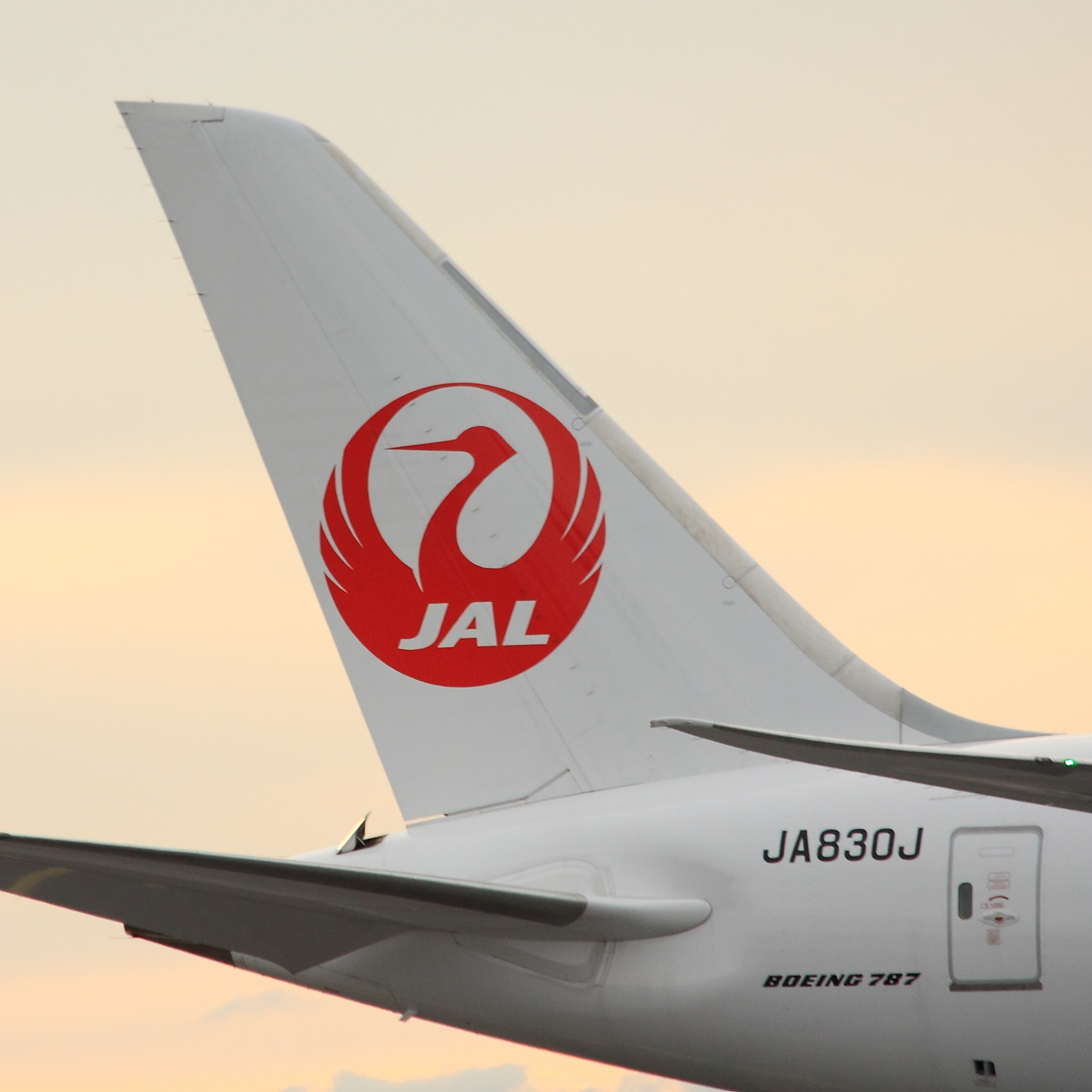
The official logo of Japan Airlines features a red-crowned crane.

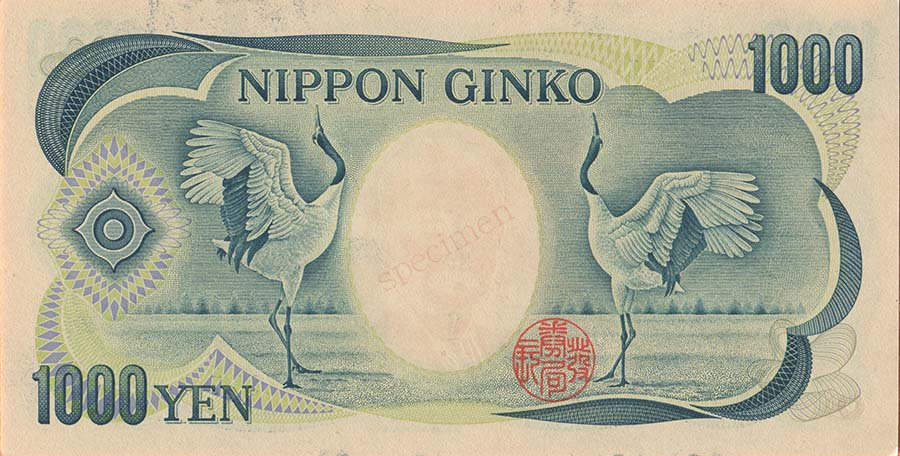
A pair of red-crowned cranes on the reverse of the Series D 1000 yen note

=== Korea ===
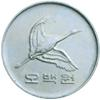
The crane is carved in a South Korean 500 won coin.

In Korea, the red-crowned crane is called durumi (Korean: 두루미), hak (Korean: 학) or danjeonghak (Korean: 단정학) and it is considered a symbol of longevity, purity, and peace. Korean seonbis regarded the bird as an icon of their constancy. The red-crowned crane is depicted on the South Korean 500 won coin and is the symbol of Incheon.

== See also ==
- Wildlife of China
- Wildlife of Japan
- Wildlife of Korea
- List of Special Places of Scenic Beauty, Special Historic Sites and Special Natural Monuments
- Izumi crane migration grounds, for a protected place in Japan visited by many migratory crane species
