= Zhalong Nature Reserve =

Protected area in Heilongjiang, China

Zhalong Nature Preserve
- 扎龙国家级自然保护区 扎龍國家級自然保護區 zhālóng guójiā jízìránbǎohùqū
- IUCN category V (protected landscape/seascape)
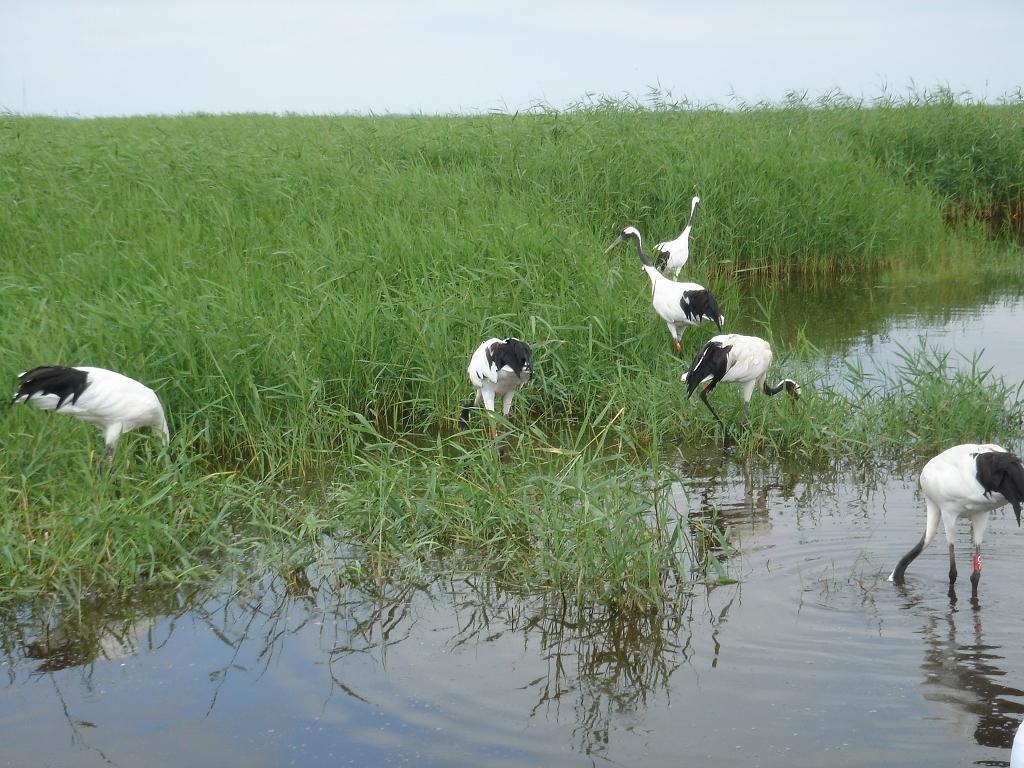
- Red-crowned cranes at the Zhalong Wetland

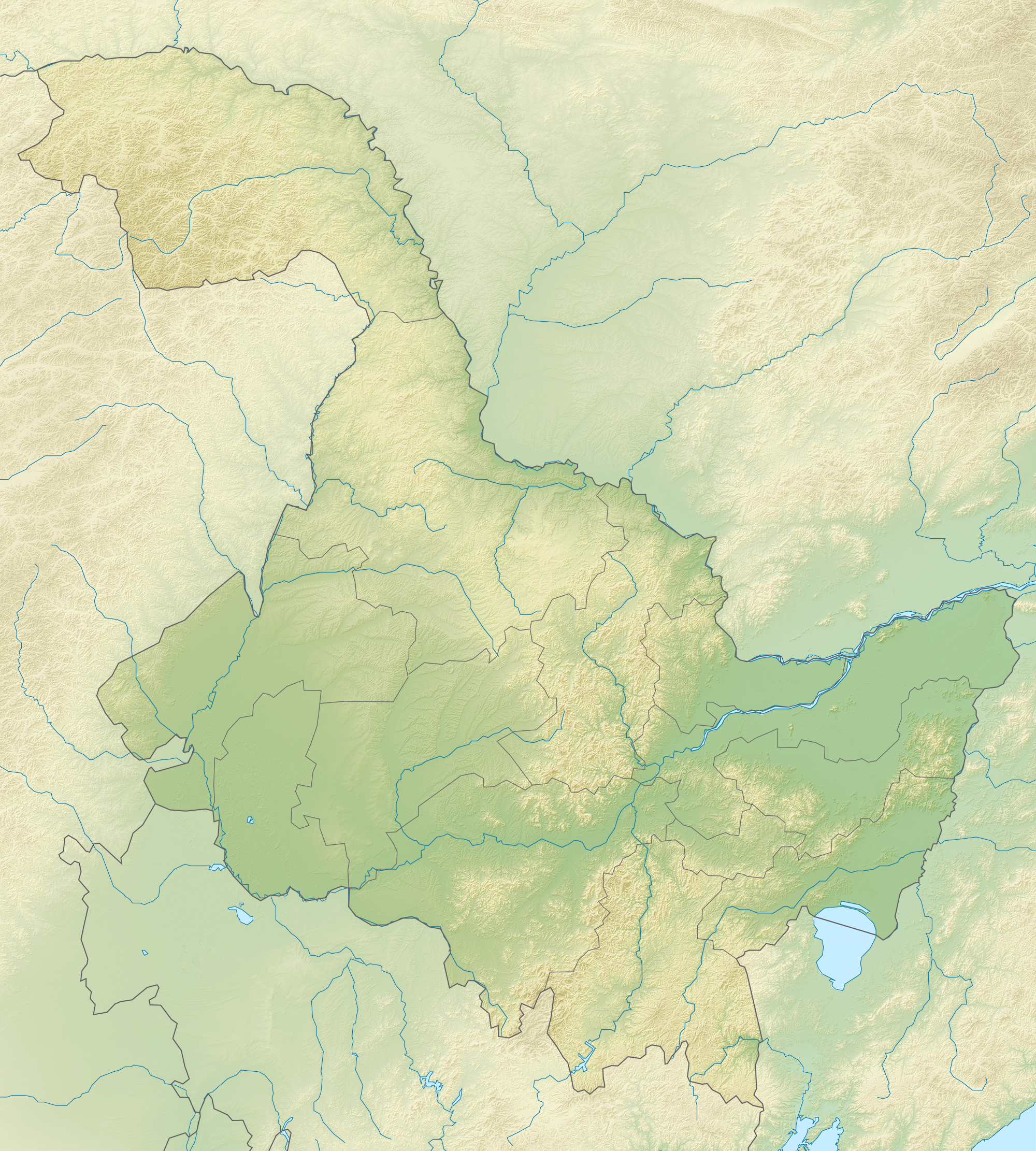
- Location within Heilongjiang
- Location: Heilongjiang, China
- Nearest city: Qiqihar
- Coordinates: 47.088°N 124.32°E
- Area: 2,100 km^{2} (810 mi^{2})
- Established: 1979

Ramsar Wetland
- Official name: Zhalong
- Designated: 31 March 1992
- Reference no.: 549

Zhalong Nature Preserve (simplified Chinese: 扎龙国家级自然保护区; traditional Chinese: 扎龍國家級自然保護區; pinyin: zhālóng guójiā jízìránbǎohùqū) is a wetland reserve in Heilongjiang province, China.

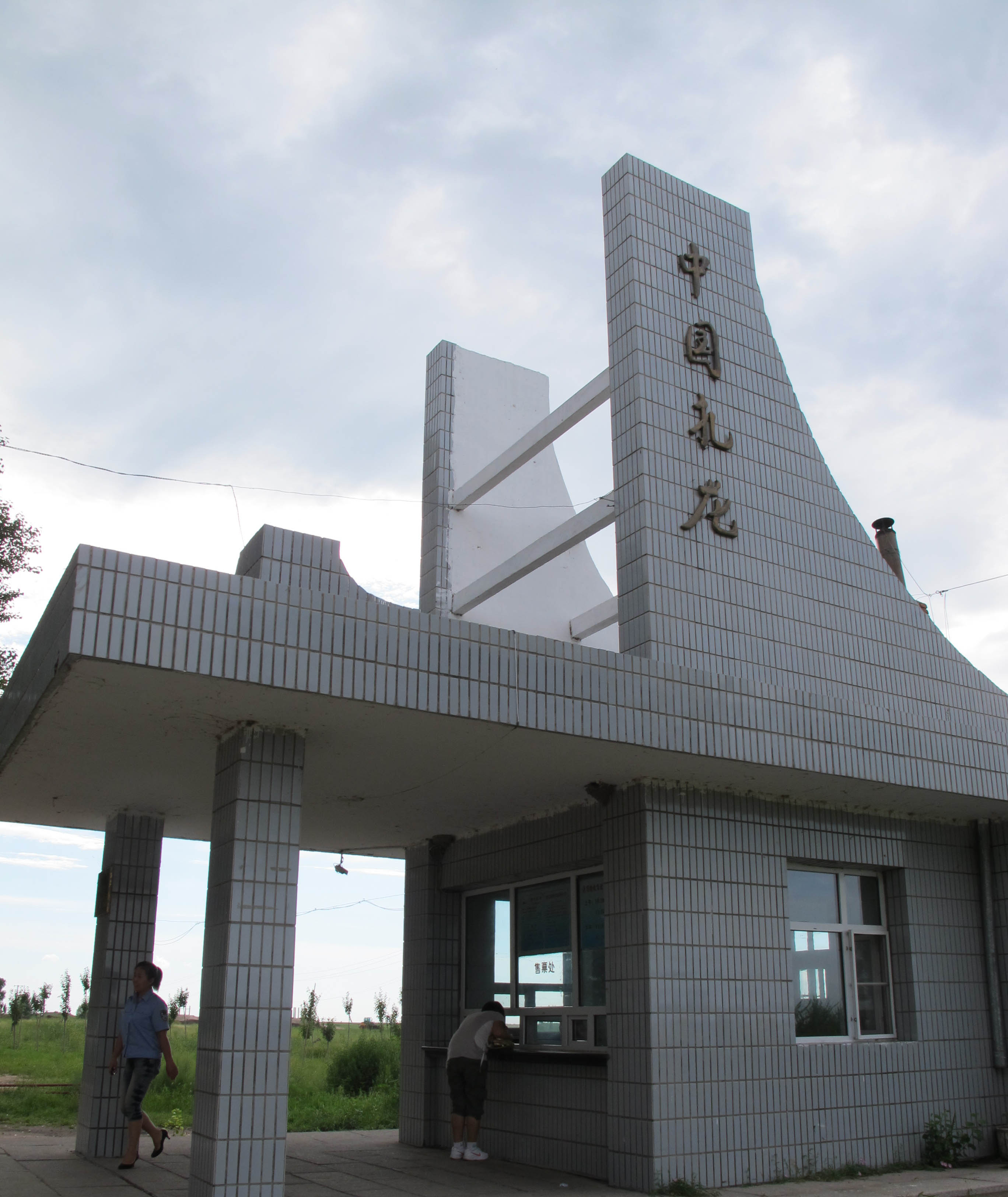
Zhalong Nature Reserve entrance

== History ==
Established in 1979, the 2,100 km^{2} (810 mi^{2}) marshland is a major migratory route for birds from the Arctic migrating to South East Asia and is one of the few breeding grounds in the far east for the marsh grassbird (Megalurus pryeri). The area is one of freshwater marshes, streams and ponds. Its ponds and reeds make it an ideal home for over 300 different species of birds. It is protected by the Chinese government. Within the park, a large flock of red-crowned cranes is held in captivity for conservation purposes. The reserve is listed as a Ramsar Wetland of International Importance (no. 549).

== Migratory birds ==
This marsh reserve serves as a stopover and nesting area for a large number of storks, swans, herons, grebes and other species. Lying on a migration path stretching from the Russian Arctic around the Gobi Desert to Southeast Asia, the land under this preserve is used by migrating birds between April and October.
