= Ada Dwyer Russell =

American actress

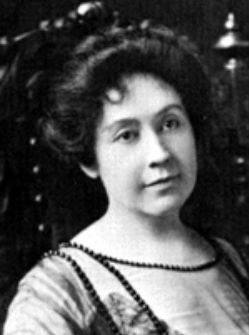
- Born: Mary Ada Dwyer; February 8, 1863
- Died: July 4, 1952 (aged 89); Chevy Chase, Maryland, US
- Resting place: Salt Lake City Cemetery; 40°46′32.6″N 111°51′28.6″W
- Occupation: Actress
- Years active: 1891-1914
- Notable work: Alone in London; Doña Julia in Don Juan (1891); Mrs. Greenthorne in Husband and Wife; Malka in The Children of the Ghetto (1892 and 1899); Belmont; Mrs. Wiggs in Mrs. Wiggs of the Cabbage Patch (1908); Bet in The Dawn of a To-Morrow (1909); Kate Fallon in The Deep Purple (1911); Grandma in Blackbirds (1912)
- Spouse: Harold Russell (married 1893 separated ~1895)
- Partner(s): Amy Lowell (together 1912–1925)
- Children: Lorna Russell Amussen (5 Sep. 1894–30 Sep. 1961)
- Parents: Sara Ann Hammer; James Dwyer

Ada Dwyer Russell (1863–1952) was an American actress who performed on stage in Broadway and London and became the muse to her poet lover Amy Lowell.

== Brief biography ==
Dwyer was born in 1863 to a recently baptized Mormon Salt Lake City bookkeeper James Dwyer and his wife Sara Ann Hammer. In 1893 at the age of thirty she married Boston-born actor Harold Russell (lived 1859–1927), and they had a daughter, Lorna, the next year. Their marriage fell apart soon after Lorna's birth and they entered a lifelong separation, though, never legally divorcing. Although no record exists of Dwyer renouncing the Mormon religion she was raised in, she ceased involvement, and her father was asked to resign in 1913 by top leaders after telling other Salt Lake members that same-sex sexual activity was not a sin.

== Dwyer and Lowell ==
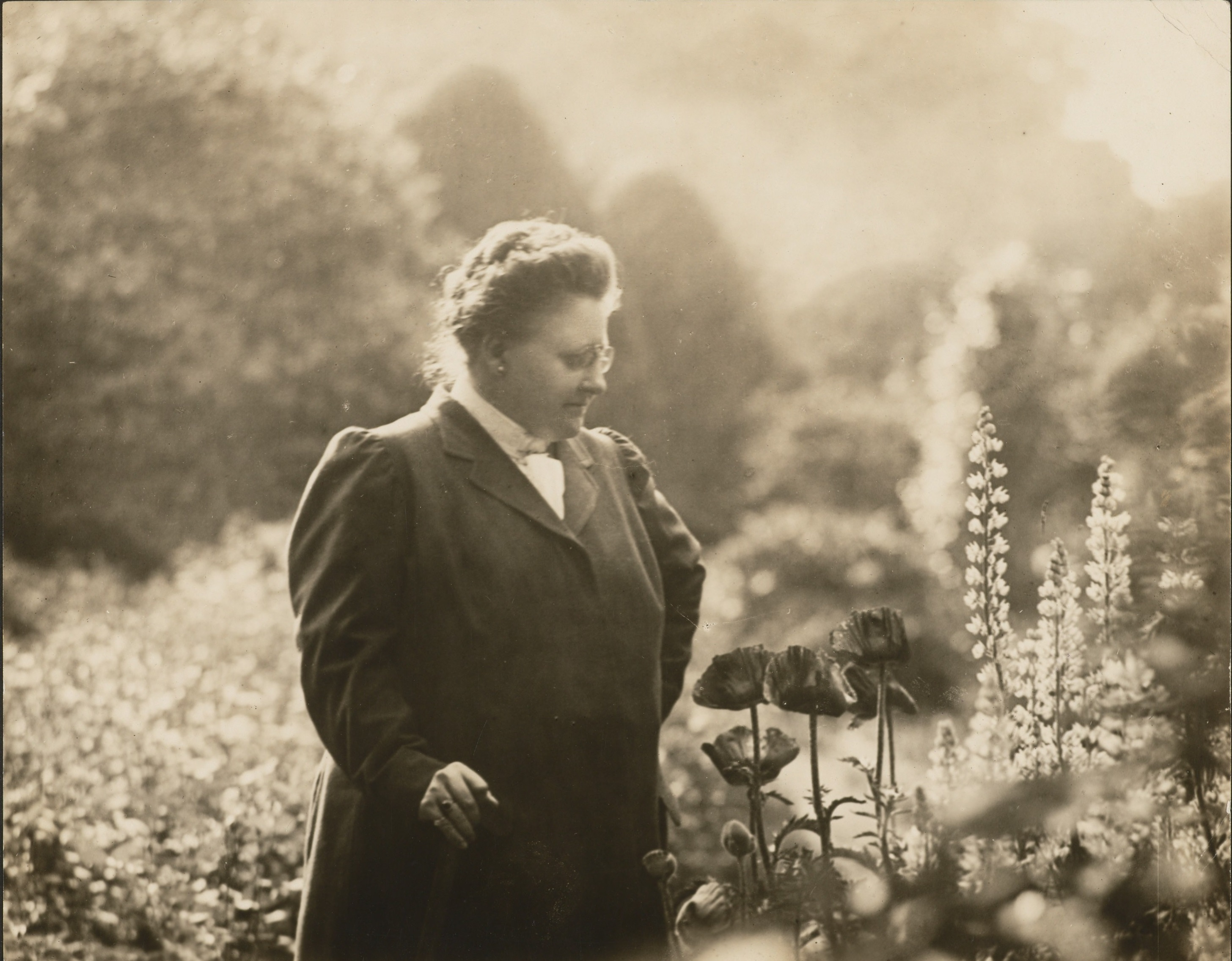
Lowell around 1916, a few years after she and Dwyer met.

Nearly two decades after separating from Russell, she met writer Amy Lowell in 1909 while on an acting tour in Boston for a play, and entered an intimate relationship with Lowell in 1912 with Dwyer returned to Boston for a different play. Dwyer moved in with Lowell in 1914 and their long-term lesbian relationship, (Note: The term "lesbian" is used here to describe the same-sex female relationship between Dwyer and Lowell, though they likely would not have used this term to describe themselves. It was not until decades later, after Lowell and Dwyer, that the term evolved into its modern use: women who romantically love other women. Lesbian is used here despite its history because it is the closest term we have to describe Dwyer and Lowell's relationship.) or "Boston marriage" (the term for a 19th-century romantic female relationship) would last over a decade until Lowell's death in 1925. Lowell lovingly referred to Dwyer as "the lady of the moon" and loved Dwyer's daughter and grandchildren as her own. Unfortunately, most of the primary document letters of communication between the two were destroyed by Ada at Amy's request, leaving much unknown about the details of their life together as they had to hide the nature of their relationship.

=== Lowell's love poems ===
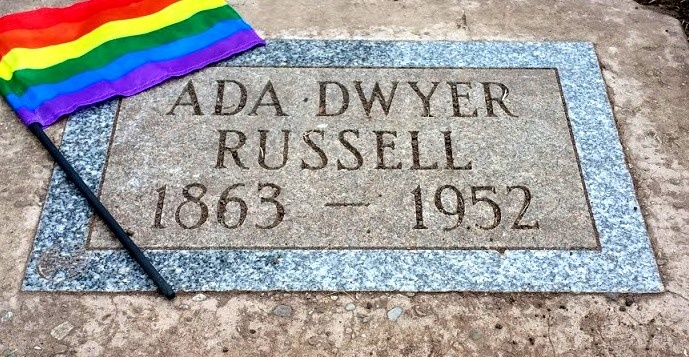
Dwyer's grave marker

Ada Dwyer Russell was the subject of many of Lowell's poems, and Lowell wanted to dedicate her books to Dwyer who refused except for one time in a non-poetry book in which Lowell wrote, "To A.D.R., This, and all my books. A.L." Examples of these love poems to Dwyer include the Taxi, Absence, In a Garden, Madonna of the Evening Flowers, Opal, and Aubade. Amy admitted to John Livingston Lowes that Dwyer was the subject of her series of romantic poems titled "Two Speak Together". Lowell's poems about Dwyer have been called the most explicit and elegant lesbian love poetry during the time between the ancient Sappho and poets of the 1970s.

== Work on Stage ==
Dwyer began acting in Broadway's 1891 performances Alone in London and Don Juan as Doña Julia. Other New York performances include Mrs. Greenthorne in Husband and Wife and Malka in The Children of the Ghetto (1892). In 1899, Dwyer reprised her role as Malka for the show's London debut, where she also acted as a supporting actress alongside Eleanor Robson (Belmont). Dwyer toured Australia as Mrs. Wiggs in Mrs. Wiggs of the Cabbage Patch in 1908 before returning to New York. Back in the United States, she acted as Bet in The Dawn of a To-Morrow (1909), Kate Fallon in The Deep Purple (1911), and Grandma in Blackbirds (1912) before retiring in 1914.
