= Florence Ayscough =

Sinologist, writer and translator

- Born: Florence Wheelock; 21 January 1875
- Died: 26 April 1942 (aged 67)
- Occupation: Lecturer at University of Chicago
- Known for: Writer and translator of Chinese literature
- Spouses: Harley Farnsworth MacNair; Francis Ayscough

Academic work
- Discipline: Sinology
- Notable works: Chinese Women Yesterday and Today (1939), Fir-Flower Tablets (1921)

Florence Ayscough MacNair (21 January 1875 – 26 April 1942) was a sinologist, writer and translator of Chinese literature.

== Early life and education ==
Florence Ayscough, née Wheelock, was born in Shanghai, China, to Canadian father, Thomas Reed Wheelock, and an American mother, Edith H. Clarke.

Ayscough moved to the United States aged nine, and attended Shaw School in Brookline, Massachusetts, near Boston. It was at the school that she met Amy Lowell, the American poet. The two were lifelong friends. Ayscough's family returned to live in China when she was in her early twenties. She was a student of Chinese art, literature, and sociology.

== Career ==
Ayscough was a lecturer on Chinese art and literature and was the author of eight books on Chinese history, culture, literary criticism and translation. She traveled as a lecturer to cities including London, Paris, Berlin and New York. Ayscough accepted a permanent lecturing post at the University of Chicago in 1938, where she lectured on Chinese literature and continued her translation work and documenting the history and culture of China.

She was Honorary Librarian of the North China Branch Royal Asiatic Society in Shanghai for fifteen years.

She collected modern Chinese paintings, including work by Xu Gu. Her efforts introduced this Chinese art form to the American public.

Her writings included translations of classical poetry and essays on Chinese art, history, and philosophy. She work also attempted to correct previous inaccurate attempts to translate the cultures of ancient and contemporary China, for example perspectives of China as a stagnant culture. In addition to countering negative stereotypes with positive reevaluations, she also sought to correct misinformation. For example, her review of the 1931 novel The Good Earth by American writer Pearl Buck, Ayscough praised the choice of contemporary Chinese peasantry as the subject, but criticized the accuracy.

Ayscough had a strong influence on the work of her friend Amy Lowell, being the source of Lowell's interest in Asian culture and Chinese poetry. Ayscough introduced Lowell to Chinese paintings and poetry in 1917. On a visit to America, she brought with her Chinese word pictures that she translated into English, which Lowell turned into rhymed poetry.

=== Publications ===
Her first book, Fir-Flower Tablets, with Amy Lowell, was a translation of poems from the Chinese. A Chinese Mirror, published in 1925, was an analysis of the structure of Chinese society government, in particular the symbolism of the Beijing imperial palaces. She published Tu Fu, the Autobiography of a Chinese Poet in 1929; her translations of the poems of Tu Fu, with a biography constructed using his poetry. In 1934 she published Travels of a Chinese Poet. These two works contributed to the introduction of Tu Fu to the British public. Ayscough wrote two books intended for younger readers; The Autobiography of a Chinese Dog, an account of Shanghai from the perspective of her Pekingese dog Yo-fei, and Fire-Cracker Land. Her final work, Chinese Women Yesterday and To-day, published in 1937, examined contemporary Chinese women leaders as successors of a long line of capable, though secluded, Chinese women.

Ayscough also contributed articles to The Encyclopaedia Sinica.

== Personal life ==
Ayscough's first husband was British importer Francis Ayscough, whom she met after moving back to Shanghai, China. As a young bride in Shanghai, she decided to learn to speak and read Mandarin. Her husband died in 1933 after a long illness. Following his death she dedicated a stained glass window (the St Francis window, in the north wall of the sanctuary) at St James the Great church in Cradley, Herefordshire, where the Revd Thomas Ayscough had been rector from 1892 to 1917.

Ayscough married her second husband, sinologist Harley Farnsworth MacNair, in 1935. Ayscough named their homes in Chicago in traditional Chinese fashion; "Wild Goose Happiness House", and "House of the Wutung Trees" after the painting by Ren Yi in their collection.

Ayscough enjoyed sailing, swimming, theatre and music, and was a member of the English Speaking Union. As a child she developed an interest in horses and developed into a capable horsewoman. In addition to Mandarin, she spoke fluent French and German.

In 1941, Ayscough was admitted to the Chicago Osteopathic Hospital, where she died on 26 April 1942 after a long illness. Her memorial service was held at Chicago's First Unitarian Church, conducted by Dr. Von Ogden Vogt. She was buried at Forest Hills Cemetery in Jamaica Plain, Massachusetts.

=== Legacy ===
After her death, Ayscough's correspondence with her friend, the poet Amy Lowell, was compiled and published by her husband Professor Harley Farnsworth MacNair. The following year he published a biography of his wife titled The Incomparable Lady. He donated her collection of 1,292 Chinese-language books to the Library of Congress.
