= Donald F. Lach =

American historian (1917–2000)

Donald Frederick Lach (pronounced "Lach, as in Bach") (September 24, 1917 – October 26, 2000) was an American historian based as a professor in the Department of History at the University of Chicago. He was an authority on Asian influence in the European civilization during the sixteenth through the eighteenth centuries.

== Early life and education ==
Lach was born in 1917 in Pittsburgh to parents of German descent. He lived in Carrick, where he spoke German in the home. He had one sister, Elizabeth, nine years his junior. The family moved from Pittsburgh to Morgantown WV when Lach's father became an accountant and obtained jobs in the fine glass industry. After completing elementary education in public schools, he received a B.A. degree from West Virginia University in 1937 and a Ph.D. in History from the University of Chicago in 1941.

== Career ==
Lach began his teaching career at Elmira College (1941–1948), then returned to the University of Chicago where he remained throughout his career. He received a Fulbright Scholarship to study in France (1949–1950) and a Social Science Research grant to continue his European research (1952–1953). He returned to Paris for several months in 1956. He co–authored two books in the early 1950s: Modern Far Eastern International Relations (with University of Chicago professor Harley Farnsworth MacNair (1950); and Europe and the Modern World (published in two volumes, 1951 & 1954; with University of Chicago professor Louis Gottschalk). In 1957, Lach published a translation, with commentary, of the preface to Gottfried Wilhelm Leibniz' Novissima Sinica.

Lach taught in Taiwan (1955–1956) at the National Chengchi University and National Taiwan University. In 1967—1968 he taught in India, at the University of Delhi. In 1965, he co–edited with Carol Flaumenhaft Asia on the Eve of Europe's Expansion. Also in 1965 the University of Chicago Press published the first volume of his magnum opus, Asia in the Making of Europe – A Century of Discovery for which he was awarded the 1967 Gordon J. Laing Award.

In 1969, Lach was named the first Bernadotte E. Schmitt Professor in History at the University of Chicago. The following year, the first book of the second volume of Asia in the Making of Europe was published as part of a continuing series from the University of Chicago Press. Books two and three, of Volume II, subtitled "A Century of Advance", followed in 1977.

Lach was the principal researcher and author of the three volume series with the joint title Asia in the Making of Europe, about European interchanges with Asia in the sixteenth and seventeenth centuries. A 1994 article in Commentary described the series as "a masterwork of scholarship." Lach was the sole author of the first volume in two books (The Century of Discovery, 1965) and of the second volume which was published in three books (A Century of Wonder, 1970, 1977, 1977). The third volume was published in 1993 in four books (A Century of Advance); it was co–written with a colleague and former student, Edwin J. Van Kley.

Lach had a continuing interest in German culture and history, and developed a secondary interest in the political situation in East Asia in the mid-20th century. In 1975, Lach and Edmund S. Wehrle's International Politics in East Asia since World War II, Praeger special studies in international politics and government, was released.

Lach was elected fellow of the American Academy of Arts and Sciences in 1984. He retired from teaching in 1988, but continued researching and writing Volume 3 of Asia in the Making of Europe.

== Personal life ==
In 1939, Lach married Alma Elizabeth Satorius, who became a chef and cookbook author. They had one child, a daughter Sandra Lach Arlinghaus. After his retirement, Lach and his wife continued living in Chicago. He died in a Chicago hospital in 2000.

In 2001 his colleagues, friends, former students, and family established The Donald F. Lach Memorial Book Fund at the University of Chicago Library.

== Works ==
- (with Harley F. MacNair) Modern Far Eastern International Relations. New York et al.: Van Nostrand, 1951.
- The Preface to Leibniz’ Novissima Sinica. Commentary, Translation, Text. Honolulu: University of Hawaii Press, 1957.
- Asia in the Making of Europe.
  - volume 1: The Century of Discovery.
    - Book 1: Chicago/London: University of Chicago Press, 1965; ISBN 0-226-46731-7.
    - Book 2: Chicago/London: University of Chicago Press, 1965; ISBN 0-226-46732-5.
  - volume 2: A Century of Wonder.
    - Book 1: The Visual Arts. Chicago/London: University of Chicago Press, 1970; ISBN 0-226-46730-9.
    - Book 2: The Literary Arts. Chicago/London: University of Chicago Press, 1977; ISBN 0-226-46733-3.
    - Book 3: The Scholarly Disciplines. Chicago/London: University of Chicago Press, 1977; ISBN 0-226-46734-1.
  - volume 3: A Century of Advance.
    - Book 1: Trade, Missions, Literature. Chicago/London: University of Chicago Press, 1993; ISBN 0226467570.
    - Book 2: South Asia. Chicago/London: University of Chicago Press, 1993; ISBN 0226467570.
    - Book 3: Southeast Asia. Chicago/London: University of Chicago Press, 1993; ISBN 0226467570.
    - Book 4: East Asia. Chicago/London: University of Chicago Press, 1993; ISBN 0226467570.
- (with Edmund S. Wehrle) International Politics in East Asia since World War II. New York: Praeger, 1975; ISBN 0275054209.
- Southeast Asia in the Eyes of Europe. The Sixteenth Century. Chicago: University of Chicago Press, 1991; ISBN 0943056144.
