= Alma Lach =

American cookbook author (1914–2013)

- Born: Alma Elizabeth Satorius; June 8, 1914; Petersburg, Illinois
- Died: October 21, 2013 (aged 99); Ann Arbor, Michigan
- Spouse: Donald F. Lach

Alma Elizabeth Lach (née Satorius; June 8, 1914 – October 21, 2013) was an American chef, cookbook author, and food consultant.

== Biography ==
Lach was born Alma Elizabeth Satorius on June 8, 1914, in Petersburg, Illinois. She began studying home economics at the University of Chicago in 1939, where she met her husband, historian Donald F. Lach. After her husband received a Fulbright Scholarship to study in Paris in 1949, Lach began attending Le Cordon Bleu cooking school. She received the Grand Diplôme from there in 1956. In the interim she published children's cook books, including A Child’s First Cook Book in 1950 and two that featured the Campbell's Kids.

Lach's first foray into mass media occurred in 1955, when she created and hosted the children's cooking show Let's Cook, which aired on WTTW in Chicago and later on WGN. From 1957 to 1964 she served as the food editor of the Chicago Sun-Times, where she published a column entitled Good Food.

Further endeavors included television appearances on Over Easy with Hugh Downs, the Lee Phillip Show on WBBM-TV, and various iterations of the Today show. Through her company, Alma Lach Kitchens, Inc., Lach worked as a consultant to various Chicago restaurants, including the Berghoff, and for Flying Food Fare, which provided meals to Midway Airlines. In the 1970s she opened the Alma Lach Cooking School on Rush Street in Chicago. In 1975 she was hired by Lettuce Entertain You founder Rich Melman as a consultant.

Lach died in Ann Arbor, Michigan, on October 21, 2013, at age 99.

== Honors and awards ==
As a result of receiving the Grand Diplôme from Le Cordon Bleu, Lach received membership in the Légion d’Honneur from the French government. She received a mink stole for first prize in the Pillsbury Creative Recipe Content for Newspaper and Magazine Food Editors for her work as food editor at the Chicago Sun-Times in 1958. In 1962 she was granted full membership in the Confrérie des Chevaliers du Tastevin, and in 1964 she became a member of the Confrérie de la Chaîne des Rôtisseurs.

== Works ==
=== Books ===
- A Child’s First Cook Book (1950). OCLC 1690449.
- The Campbell Kids at Home (1954). OCLC 46457274.
- The Campbell Kids Have a Party (1954). OCLC 7085271.
- Let’s Cook (1956). OCLC 31823968
- Cooking à la Cordon Bleu (1970). OCLC 101633.
- Hows and Whys of French Cooking (1974). ISBN 0226467406. OCLC 3033954

=== Television series ===
- Let’s Cook (1955).
