= Xu Gu =

Chinese painter and poet

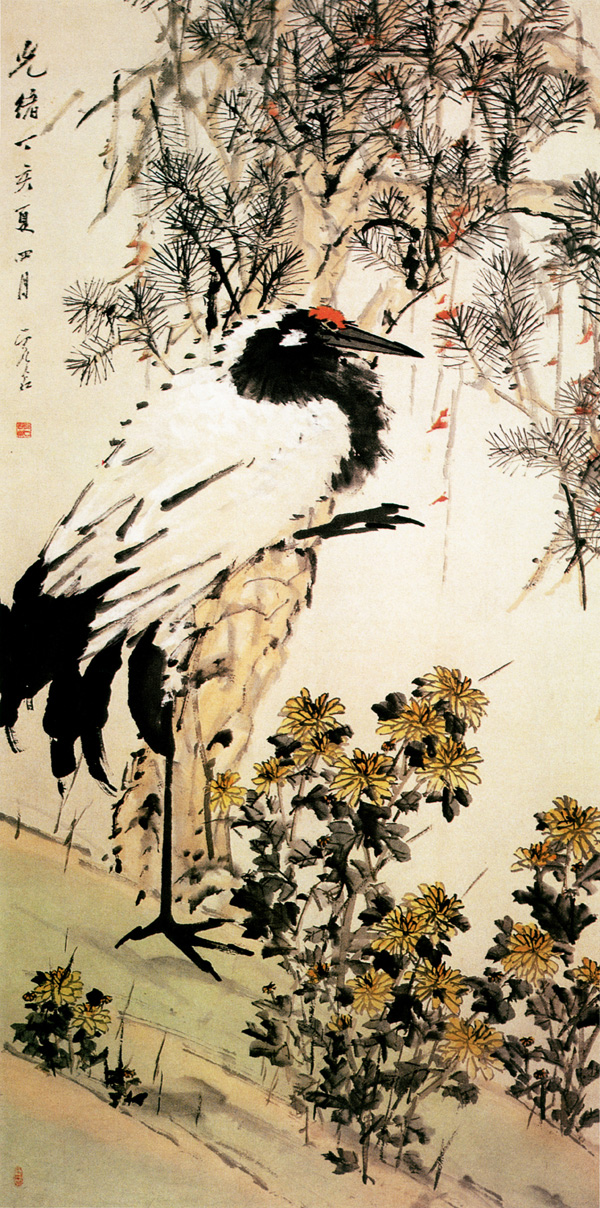
Xu Gu, Pine Tree and Crane

Xū Gǔ (Hsü Ku, simplified Chinese: 虚谷; traditional Chinese: 虛谷; pinyin: Xū Gǔ); (c. 1824–1896) was a Chinese painter and poet during the Qing Dynasty (1644–1912).

== Early life and career ==
Xu was born in She County in the Anhui province, and later lived in Guangling in the Jiangsu province. His style name was 'Xugu' and his sobriquet was 'Ziyang Shanren'. Xu was an army official, and then later a monk. When painting he used the side of the brush in a fluent and bold style. In poetry he produced the work Poetry of Xugu monk.

== See also ==
- Florence Ayscough, who collected his paintings.
