= Wanshou Temple (Jiangxi) =

Taoist temple in Nanchang, China

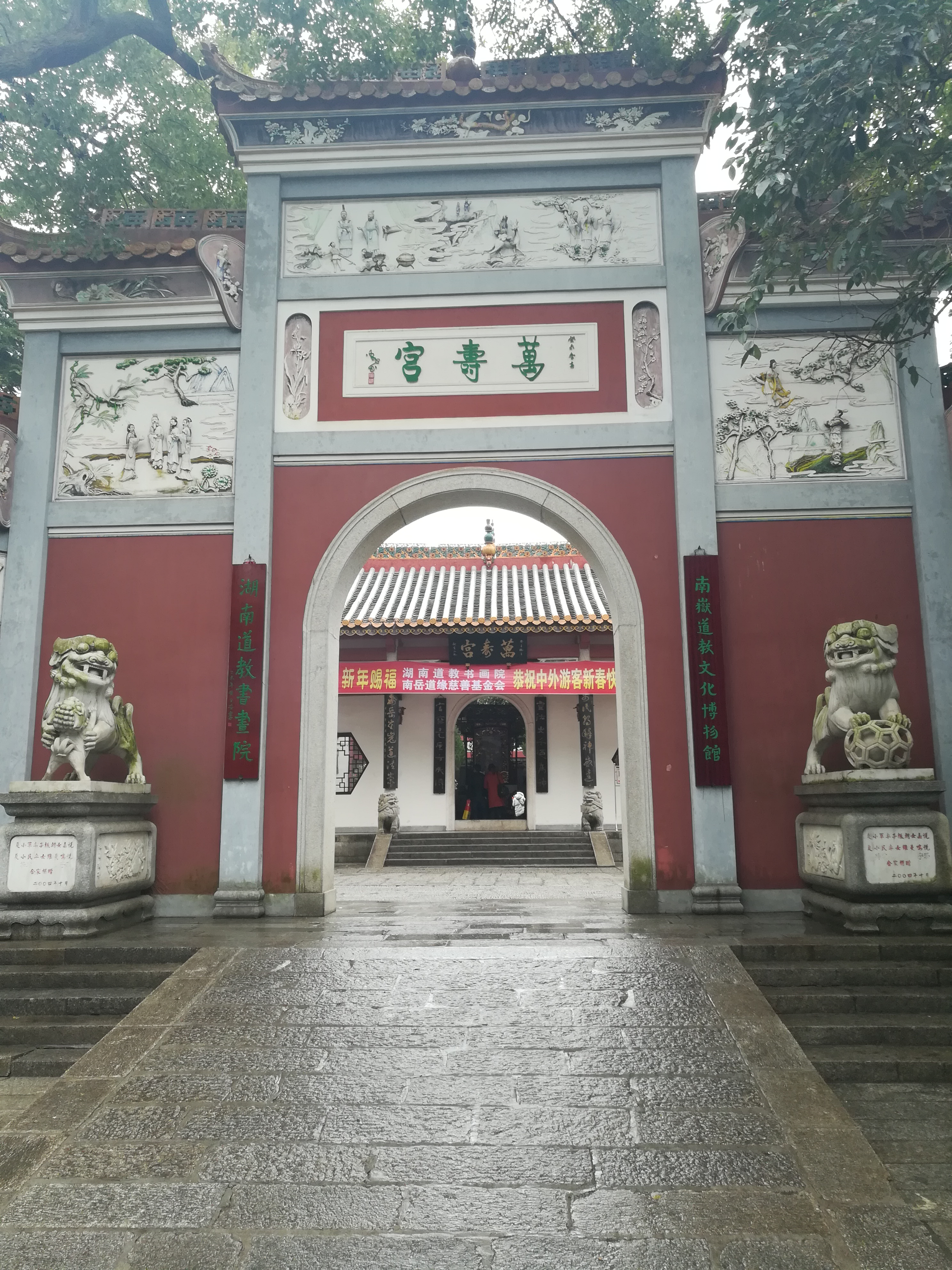
Wanshou Temple Gate

Wanshou Temple (simplified Chinese: 万寿宫; traditional Chinese: 萬壽宮; pinyin: wàn shòu gōng) is a Taoist temple in Nanchang City, Jiangxi Province, China.
