= Harley Farnsworth MacNair =

American scholar of Chinese foreign relations and history

Harley Farnsworth MacNair (b. 22 July 1891 Greenfields, Pennsylvania - d. Chicago, 22 June 1947) was a scholar and academic specialist in the modern international relations of East Asia. After graduation from University of Redlands, he taught first at St. John's University, an Episcopal institution in Shanghai, then at University of Chicago from 1931 until his death. He was known for his prolific writing on modern Chinese history, diplomacy, and politics. In 1935 he married Florence Wheelock Ayscough (1878-1942) a noted translator of Chinese poetry.

== Family and early life ==
MacNair was born in Greenfields, Pennsylvania, the son of Douglad Evander MacNair and Nettie Adelia Farnsworth MacNair. He was among the first students in the University of Redlands, an interdenominational university founded by Baptists in Redlands, Southern California. As an undergraduate, he served both in the town library and as the university's librarian, and was president of the student body. Upon graduation in 1912, he volunteered to serve in Boone University in Wuchang, China, but was instead assigned as a missionary to St. John's University, an Episcopal institution in Shanghai in 1916. He pursued graduate studies during these years, studying on furloughs, and earned a master's degree at Columbia University, New York, in 1916 and a Ph.D. in 1922 from the University of California at Berkeley. He became professor of history and government at St. Johns, and head of the department in 1919.

His Berkeley doctoral dissertation was published in Shanghai as The Chinese Abroad: Their Position and Protection (1924). He came to the United States to spend his furlough of 1927–1928 at University of Washington, and the summer of 1928 at University of Chicago. He and his mother moved their household goods to Chicago, but MacNair was not at first inclined to accept the offer of an ongoing position there. He returned to St. John's and did not leave that position until 1931, and returned the next year to work with refugees in North China.

Perhaps the most important factor in overcoming his reluctance to leave St. John's for Chicago was the urging of Florence Wheelock Ayscough (1878-1942), a writer and a translator of Chinese poetry. Born in Shanghai, she lived in China until she was eleven. She and MacNair first met in 1916, and the two immediately became fast friends. He later wrote that "Tea," with her, "was an occasion for the exchange of ideas with friends around a fire or in a garden." But after she and her husband left Shanghai, she met MacNair again in 1929, when she told him of her belief that his work in China was done. She said that Chicago was a better chance, as he later recalled, to "reverse what I had long been doing in China: help the West to understand the East." He took his mother to meet her in 1931. Her husband died in 1935, and she and MacNair married September 7, 1935. Their home in Chicago became the gathering place for persons concerned with China.

== Professional life and career ==
Modern Chinese History: Selected Readings, a two-volume compilation of some 400 excerpts of documents and writings chosen to be assigned along with H.B. Morse's The International Relations of the Chinese Empire in his course at St. John's. The selection was aimed to give sources of the "thoughts, the customs, and the deeds of those who 'made' history". MacNair went on to condense Morse's three volumes into Far Eastern International Relations (1928), co-authored with Morse, which he finished in 1927 as he and other St. John's faculty were standing guard in expectation of armed uprisings to welcome Nationalist Army troops. The Nationalist government authorities, however, suppressed a planned printing in Shanghai, and the American printing did not appear until 1931. The two authors revised the book, and further revisions were undertaken by Donald F. Lach.

The Chinese Abroad: Their Position and Protection published in 1927, surveyed the modern experience of Overseas Chinese. The prominent Chinese diplomat V.K. Wellington Koo wrote an Introduction, with a foreword by Fong F. Sec. A reviewer at the time quoted MacNair that the approach was "expository and not critical", and noted that he "adds his plea to those of American statesmen from the time of President Cleveland for the passage of legislation conferring on the federal executive and judicial agencies power to protect aliens against the violation of their treaty rights". The reviewer added that "the author has not, apparently, allowed his Chinese environment to destroy reasonable objectivity in his use of materials."

The 1929 Far Eastern International Relations, which he and H.B. Morse wrote, was based on Morse's The International Relations of the Chinese Empire. One reviewer praised their "abundant narrative" and contrasted their approach with other histories that gave only sketchy outlines and chapter-by-chapter bibliographies, and that focused on international relations and give only enough internal political history to explain them. The review praised MacNair's additions to Morse, such as the description of the events of 1925–1927, which led to suppression of the Shanghai printing of the volume.

In the spring of 1930, MacNair gave a series of lectures to the public at University of Chicago, which he revised and published with University of Chicago Press in 1931 as China in Revolution: An Analysis of Politics and Militarism. Arthur Holcombe welcomed it in a review in the American Political Science Review.

In the 1930s, especially after his marriage to Florence Ayscough, his interests turned away from international relations and political conditions, and from professional scholarship. During World War II, however, he was a staff member of the University of Chicago Civil Affairs Training School, where the views he presented were sometimes in conflict with American government policies. His last major publication was an edited symposium, China, which gathered essays mainly on culture and history.

He did not, however, undertake the study of the Chinese language, although he admired tremendously the work of his wife and others who used it, and did not use Chinese language in his research, feeling that he did not have the time for both this study and his extensive professional obligations.

== Selected writings ==
For a fuller listing of MacNair's works, see Price, "Harley Farnsworth MacNair."

- MacNair, Harley Farnsworth (1922). Modern Chinese History: Selected Readings. Shanghai: Commercial Press. Internet Archive online Here.
- ____. Protection of Alien Chinese. Doctoral Thesis. University of California, Berkeley, 1922. HathiTrust online Here
- ____. The Chinese Abroad, Their Position and Protection: A Study in International Law and Relations. (Shanghai: Commercial Press, 1924). Online at Hathi Press here
- ____, China's New Nationalism And Other Essays (Shanghai: Commercial Press, 1925.
- ____. China's International Relations & Other Essays. (Shanghai: Commercial Press, 1926).
- ____. China in Revolution: An Analysis of Politics and Militarism under the Republic. (Chicago: University of Chicago Press, 1931). Internet Archive online here
- The real conflict between China and Japan; an analysis of opposing ideologies Internet Archive online Here
- Hosea Ballou Morse and, Far Eastern International Relations. (Boston, New York: Houghton Mifflin, 1931).
- ____, with Liu, N.. Voices from Unoccupied China. (Chicago: The University of Chicago Press, 1944)
- ____. China. (Berkeley and Los Angeles: University of California Press, 1946).
- ____, and Donald F. Lach. Modern Far Eastern International Relations. (New York: Van Nostrand, 1950).
- ____, and Donald Frederick Lach. Modern Far Eastern International Relations. New York: Van Nostrand Company, 1955). Online here
- Hosea Ballou Morse, and ___, translated by Zengyi Yao. Yuan Dong Guo Ji Guan Xi Shi. (Shanghai: Shanghai shu dian chu ban she, Di 1 ban., 1998). ISBN 7806224122.
