= Xianghe Water Conservancy Hub Project =

The Xianghe Water Conservancy Hub Project (Chinese: 湘河水利枢纽工程) and its accompanying irrigation project, or Xianghe Reservoir (Chinese: 湘河水库), are situated in Namling County, Shigatse City, within the Tibet Autonomous Region. This project is one of the 172 significant water conservancy initiatives designated by the State Council and constitutes a key element of the 13th Five-Year Plan for the reform and development of water conservancy in Tibet. It commenced in April 2019 and is scheduled for completion in December 2022, with a total investment of RMB 2.71 billion.

This project focuses on irrigation, water supply, and improving the natural environment in the protected area, as well as power generation. The reservoir possesses a total capacity of 113.4 million cubic meters, serves a population exceeding 30,000, and has a multi-year average water supply of 111.8 million cubic meters, with 62.76 million cubic meters allocated for irrigation purposes.

== Construction ==
Construction of the Xianghe Water Conservancy Hub and Supporting Irrigation District Project began in April 2019, and it finished the water storage safety assessment in June 2022. This laid the groundwork for downgate storage and made it easier to reach the 2022 goal of generating power from the first unit. On October 12, the Tibet Xianghe Water Conservancy Hub and its associated irrigation district project commenced operations with lower gate storage. The construction team completed the crucial task of elevating the stator of the first unit (4#) in November and installed electrical equipment, with the goal of achieving grid-connected power generation by the end of December 2022.

The project primarily comprises a barrage, cave spillway, diversion spillway, power diversion system, power plant, and fish passage. This is a substantial water conservancy hub project primarily focused on agriculture and water delivery, with consideration for power generation. On June 30, 2023, the Xianghe Hydroelectric Power Station commenced operations following the completion of the second phase of water storage at the Xianghe Reservoir.

== See also ==
- Manla Water Conservancy Hub Project
