= Elmwood (Cambridge, Massachusetts) =

Historic house in Massachusetts, US

- U.S. National Register of Historic Places
- U.S. National Historic Landmark District
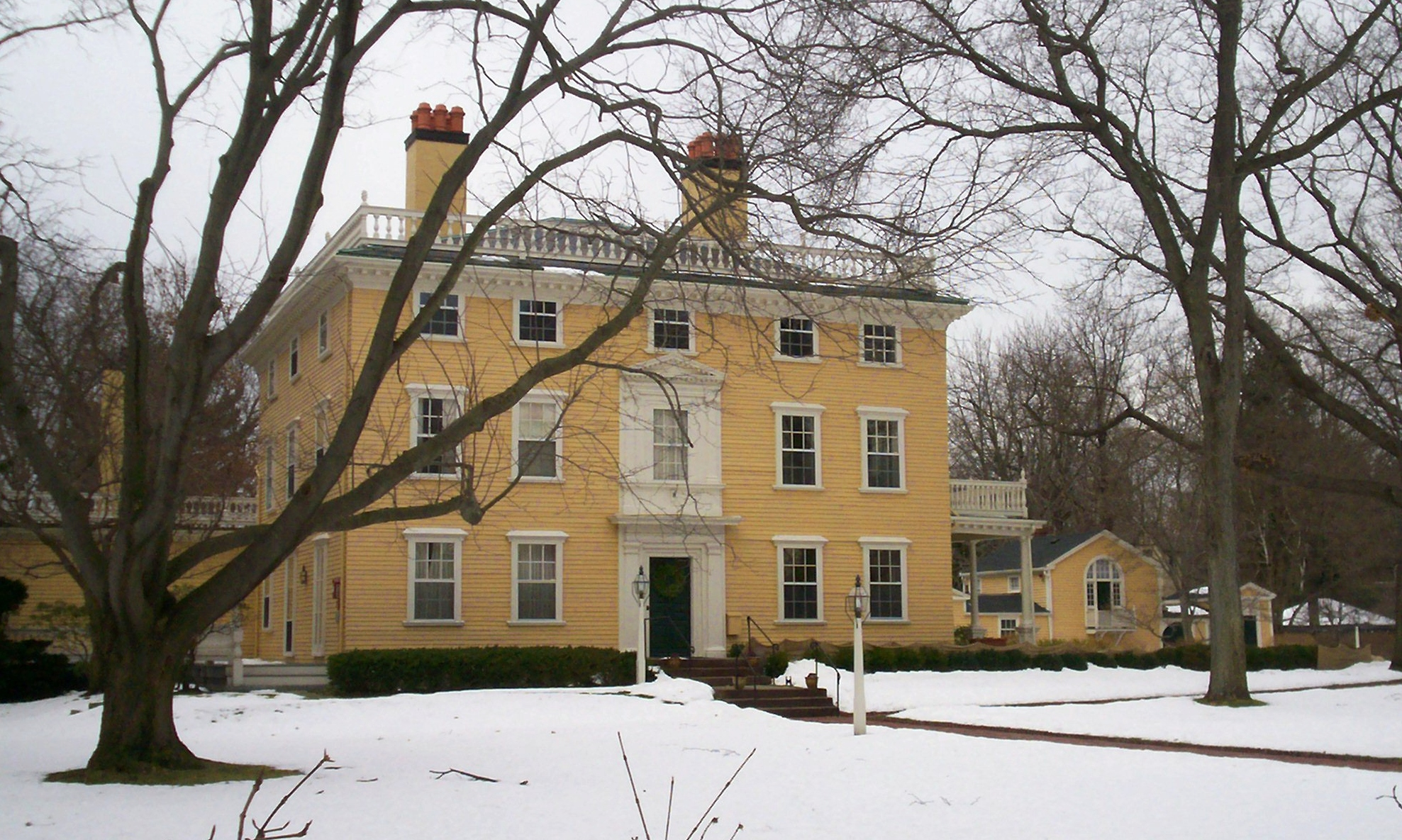
- Elmwood, December 2008

- Location within Massachusetts Location within the United States
- Location: 33 Elmwood Avenue, Cambridge, Massachusetts
- Coordinates: 42°22′31.7″N 71°8′18.2″W
- Built: 1767
- Architect: Thomas Oliver
- Architectural style: Georgian
- NRHP reference No.: 66000364

Significant dates
- Added to NRHP: October 15, 1966
- Designated NHLD: December 29, 1962

Elmwood, also known as the Oliver-Gerry-Lowell House, is a historic house and centerpiece of a National Historic Landmark District in Cambridge, Massachusetts. It is known for several prominent former residents, including: Thomas Oliver (1734–1815), royal Lieutenant Governor of Massachusetts; Elbridge Gerry (1744–1814), signer of the US Declaration of Independence, Vice President of the United States and eponym of the term "gerrymandering"; and James Russell Lowell (1819–1891), American writer, poet, and foreign diplomat.

The house, originally on a 100-acre estate, was built in the Georgian style about 1767 by John Nutting for Lt. Governor Thomas Oliver, member of a wealthy merchant family in the Province of Massachusetts Bay. Abandoned by the Loyalist Oliver at the outset of the American Revolutionary War, the property was confiscated by the state of Massachusetts. It was purchased by Elbridge Gerry, who used it as his family residence until his death in 1814. The house was sold by his heirs to the Lowell family, and was the birthplace and residence of James Russell Lowell for most of his life. During Lowell's ownership significant portions of the original estate were sold off, and his heirs sold the house to art historian and Harvard professor, Arthur Kingsley Porter. He bequeathed the property to the university, which now uses it as the official residence of its president.

Architecturally the house has retained most of its Georgian character, and has had only modest exterior additions and modifications. Although it was decorated in a Victorian style by the Lowells, Harvard restored the interior to a more traditional Georgian style when it took over the property. The house is not open to the public. In addition to the property owned by Harvard, the National Historic Landmark District encompasses the adjacent Lowell Park, a state-owned park which was once part of the original Oliver estate.

== History ==
=== Oliver, Revolution, and Gerry ===
The house now known as Elmwood was built about 1767 by Thomas Oliver, appointed Lieutenant-Governor of Massachusetts in the spring of 1774. Oliver owed his vast wealth to slave labor as both heir to Antiguan planters and absentee owner of Friar’s Hill plantation, Antigua, where 206 people were enslaved when inherited by his children. Oliver’s wife, Elizabeth Vassall, was the daughter of John Vassall, owner of Jamaican slave-labor plantations Newfound River and Lower Works Pen. At probate, he enslaved 1,167 people. Elizabeth Vassall and Thomas Oliver enslaved 11 individuals at Elmwood.

The Oliver-Vassall estate, located on the western edge of Cambridge, Massachusetts, included about 100 acres (40 ha) of rolling fields with a commanding view of the Charles River. The property extended from Fresh Pond in the north across the Charles River to what is now the Boston neighborhood of Brighton to the south, then part of Cambridge. It was not far from the 1759 mansion built for John Vassall II (Elizabeth Vassall's brother) and his wife Elizabeth Oliver (Thomas Oliver's sister). Their estate would later become Washington's Headquarters and Longfellow's home.

On September 1, 1774, pursuant to orders given by Governor Thomas Gage, British Army troops removed provincial gunpowder from a magazine in what is today Somerville. This activity caused a spontaneous rising of militia throughout the province amid rumors of actual violence that is known as the Powder Alarm. The next day Oliver was able to dissipate a crowd that formed in Cambridge (near present-day Harvard Square) by going to Boston, conferring with Gage, and reporting that no further military movements were planned. However, the crowd followed him home and compelled him to resign his office, which he did under protest. Oliver and his family shortly thereafter fled to Boston.

Early in the siege of Boston that began after the battles of Lexington and Concord in April 1775, the house was occupied by troops that eventually became part of the Continental Army; one of the building's notable occupants during this time was Benedict Arnold, then in the Connecticut militia. After the Battle of Bunker Hill it was used as a hospital. When the British military evacuated Boston in March 1776, the Olivers, like many other Loyalists, traveled with them to Nova Scotia. Oliver eventually settled in Bristol, England, where he died in 1815.

The Massachusetts government confiscated Oliver's property during the American Revolutionary War, and sold it in 1779 to Andrew Cabot. In 1787 Elbridge Gerry purchased the Cambridge estate, which became his home. In the aftermath of the XYZ Affair, for which Gerry was unjustly criticized, Elmwood was the scene of protests in which Gerry was burned in effigy. Gerry served as Governor of Massachusetts in 1810 and 1811; redistricting of the state in 1812 prompted the coining of the term "gerrymandering" to describe the practice of shaping legislative districts in partisan ways. In March 1813 Gerry took the oath of office as Vice President of the United States in the house; he died in 1814 in Washington, D. C. Gerry rented out large parts of the estate to tenant farmers. He sold and later repurchased land near the Charles River from a relative, who operated a landing and storehouse; the area (located near the present-day Eliot Bridge) became known as Gerry's Landing.

=== Lowell family ===
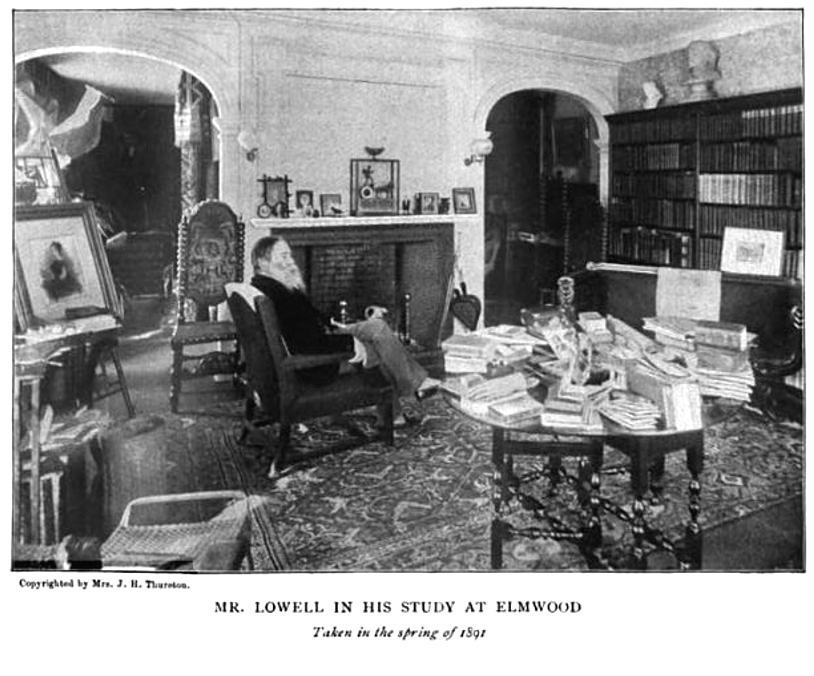
James Russell Lowell at Elmwood (from Edward Everett Hale's biography of Lowell, published 1891)

Ten acres, including the house, were purchased from the Gerry family in 1818 by Charles Russell Lowell, Sr. of the Lowell family. It was in this home that James Russell Lowell was born on February 22, 1819.

In the 1850s, Lowell dealt with many personal tragedies, including the sudden death of his mother and his third daughter, Rose. His personal troubles as well as the Compromise of 1850 convinced him to spend a winter in Italy after coaxing from William Wetmore Story. The trip was financed by the sale of land around Elmwood, and Lowell intended to sell off even further. Ultimately, 25 of the original 30 acres (120,000 m^{2}) were sold to supplement Lowell's income. His personal troubles continued: his son Walter died while overseas, his wife Maria White Lowell died in October 1853, his father became deaf, and his sister Rebecca was deteriorating mentally such that she often went without speaking for weeks. He had difficulty coping and became a recluse at Elmwood for a time until an invitation to speak at the Lowell Institute resulted in a job offer at Harvard College. He accepted the job, with the request he be allowed to study abroad for a year first.

Lowell returned to the United States and began his duties at Harvard in the summer of 1856. Still grieving the loss of his wife, however, he avoided Elmwood. Instead, he took lodging in an area known as Professors' Row on Kirkland Street in Cambridge along with his daughter Mabel and her governess Frances Dunlap. Lowell and Dunlap married in 1857. After the death of Lowell's father in January 1861 due to a heart attack, he moved back to Elmwood with his family. Despite avoiding the home for so long, he was pleased to be back. He wrote to his friend Charles Frederick Briggs: "I am back again to the place I love best. I am sitting in my old garret, at my old desk, smoking my old pipe... I begin to feel more like my old self than I have these ten years". However, Elmwood's expenses drained him, with taxes at $1,000 a year. As early as 1867, he considered renting out Elmwood and moving into a smaller home elsewhere but never did. Instead, to ease his financial plight, he began to sell off land in 1870 until only two and a half acres remained.

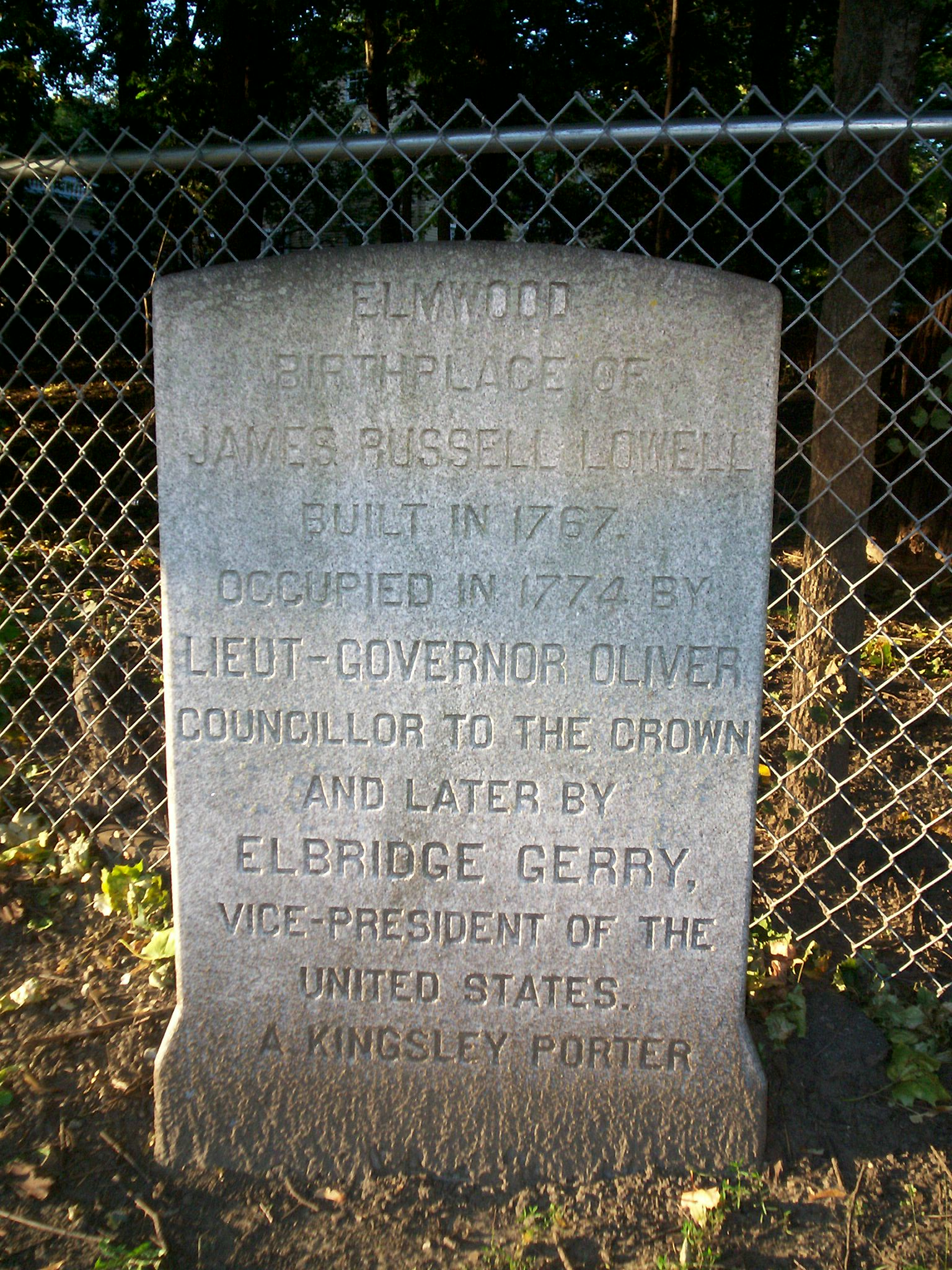
This marker near Mount Auburn Street summarizes the history of the home

Lowell remained at Elmwood for the remainder of his life with a few exceptions, including the period between 1877 and 1885 when he served as Minister to Spain and Great Britain. At Elmwood, he wrote some of his best-known works, including The Vision of Sir Launfal, The Biglow Papers, and A Fable for Critics, all published in 1848. It was Lowell who named the house "Elmwood". He mentions the home in some of his poetry:

My Elmwood chimneys seem crooning to me,
As of old in their moody, minor key,
And out of the past the hoarse wind blows.

Lowell's friend and fellow poet Henry Wadsworth Longfellow also wrote a poem about the house called "The Herons of Elmwood".

Beginning in the summer of 1872, when Lowell traveled to Europe, he rented the house to Thomas Bailey Aldrich and his family. Aldrich wrote of the experience living at Elmwood to Bayard Taylor on January 9, 1873:

I wish I had time to tell you how pleasant our life is in beautiful old Elmwood. You know what a charming place it is. We have it for two years, dating from last July. The outdoor life has worked a wonderful change in my boys, who have become hardy young giants already. Sunrise and sunset, rainstorms and snowstorms, have quite a new meaning to us here, after being cooped up so many years in a city house.

Years later, in 1877, when Lowell was appointed Ambassador to Spain, he rented the home to the violinist Ole Bull. Shortly after Bull's death in 1880, the Norwegian poet, playwright, and novelist Bjørnstjerne Bjørnson was the guest of Bull's widow at Elmwood for three months. Upon Lowell's return to the United States in 1885, he stayed at Elmwood for his remaining years. He died in the home on August 12, 1891.

=== 20th century to present ===
After the death of James Russell Lowell, the house was inherited and used seasonally first by his daughter Mabel, who had by then married Edward Burnett, then by their children. Arthur Kingsley Porter purchased Elmwood and the remaining lands from the Lowell heirs in 1920. Porter, a Harvard professor, used the house as a private residence, but also taught some of his classes there and allowed students to use his extensive library. Porter would later become Chair of Harvard's Art History Department. In 1929, Porter purchased Glenveagh Castle in Ireland. He disappeared from the nearby island of Inishbofin on July 8, 1933. Under the terms of his will, Elmwood was bequeathed to Harvard, although his wife was granted lifetime occupancy. She died in 1962, at which time Harvard took full control of the property.

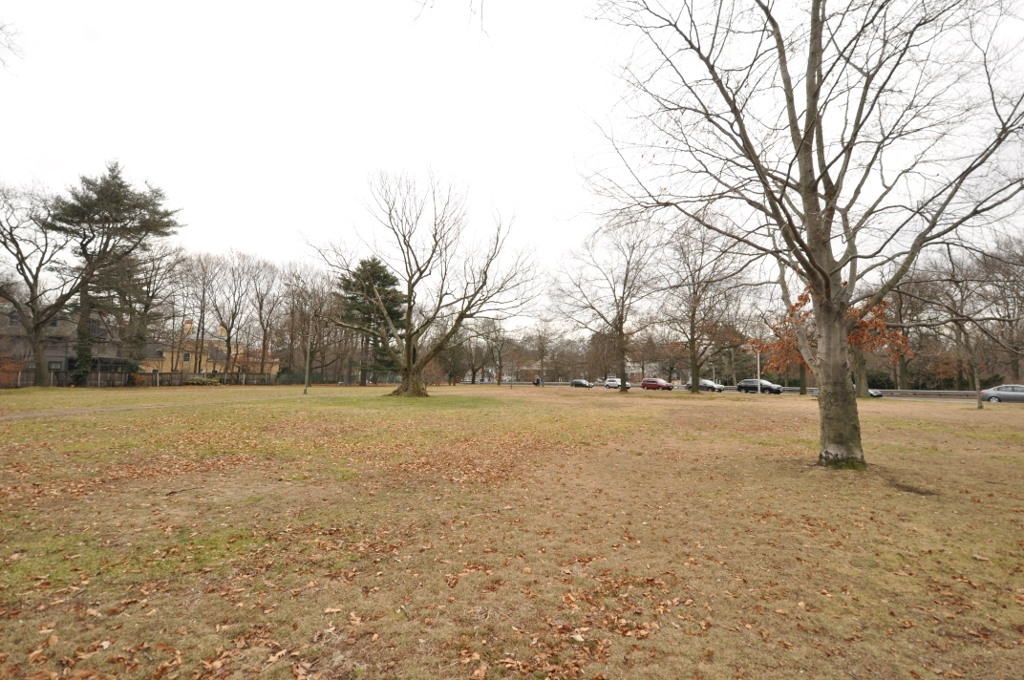
Lowell Park; Elmwood is visible in the distance

After major renovations Elmwood was occupied by Franklin L. Ford, who was Harvard's Dean of the Faculty of Arts and Sciences for most of the 1960s. Acting President Derek Bok moved his family there in 1971 amid security concerns originating in student protest activity near the then-president's residence on Quincy Street. The house has been the official residence of Harvard presidents since. It still houses portions of the Lowell library.

The Harvard-owned property and the adjacent state-owned Lowell Park were declared a National Historic Landmark District in 1966. Lowell Park was established in 1899 as a memorial to James Russell Lowell. It was paid for in part by private subscription and also with some public funds, and donated to the state in 1898. It was at first administered by the Metropolitan District Commission as part of the Charles River Reservation; the MDC's successor, the Massachusetts Department of Conservation and Recreation, is now responsible for the park.

== Architecture ==
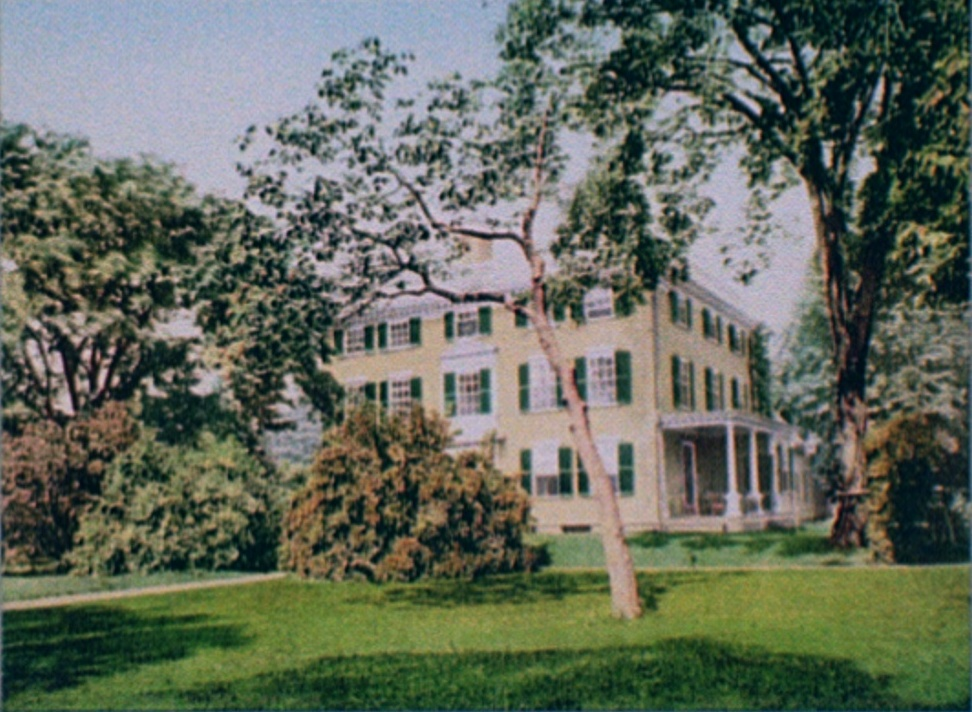
A photochrom image of Elmwood, published by the Detroit Publishing Co. in the 1890s

Although parts of Elmwood's interior have been altered, its exterior has not changed greatly over the years. It is a large, square, clapboarded structure in Georgian style with brick-lined walls and two chimneys. The floor plans on each floor are the same: two rooms on either side of a central hall housing a staircase. The windows on the first and second floors have decorative cornices, and a 19th-century balustrade surrounds the roof. The exterior entranceway is flanked by Tuscan pilasters supporting a classic entablature decorated with a frieze. Above the entablature is a large window with Ionic pilasters on either side, topped by a triangular pediment.

The building has had some modifications and additions, made principally during the Lowell ownership period. Additions housing more modern services and a library were added to the west side of the house, and first-floor windows in the front parlor and dining room were replaced with French doors. A one-story porch with balustraded roof deck was added on the north side of the house, and a terrace was installed on the south side. The Lowells decorated the house in a Victorian style; Harvard restored the building interior to an 18th-century style when it took over the property.

== See also ==
- List of National Historic Landmarks in Massachusetts
- National Register of Historic Places listings in Cambridge, Massachusetts
