= Thy Strong Word did Cleave the Darkness =

Hymn by Martin Franzmann
- Composer(s): Thomas John Williams

"Thy Strong Word did Cleave the Darkness" is a Lutheran hymn written by Martin H. Franzmann and set to the tune of Ebenezer by Thomas John Williams.

== Contents ==
Stanza 1

"Thy strong word did cleave the darkness;

At thy speaking it was done.

For created light we thank thee

While thine ordered seasons run.

Alleluia! Alleluia! Praise to thee who light dost send!

Alleluia! Alleluia! Alleluia without end!"

The hymn is made up of six verses, of which four are usually included in a hymnal. Each verse consists of a quatrain with an ABAB rhyme scheme, and is followed by a common refrain. Franzmann originally only wrote four verses, but eventually added one with a "cross emphasis" and later a doxology as the sixth and final verse. The text is partially based on passages from Isaiah 9.

== History ==
Martin Franzmann was a professor of the New Testament at Concordia Seminary in Missouri beginning in 1946. Franzmann was inspired to write "Thy Strong Word" after a colleague at the seminary stumbled upon the traditional hymn tune of Ebenezer by Welsh songwriter Thomas John Williams. The colleague asked that Franzmann create a new text for the hymn that related to their work at Concordia. As such, Franzmann based his hymn on the motto of the seminary, "Anōthen to Phōs" which means "Light from Above". The work was completed in 1954.

== Usage ==
"Thy Strong Word" was first sung in a chapel service at Concordia Seminary in October 1954. It was then sung at the seminary's commencement ceremony annually from 1955 to 1997, as well as at several commencements since then including in 2022. In other Lutheran churches, the hymn is frequently used during Reformation Day services, and it is also often sung during the season of Epiphany.

In the Episcopal Church, the song was included in The Hymnal 1982. It replaced the contentious hymn "Once to Every Man and Nation", also set to Ebenezer, which had been written in opposition to the Mexican-American War and was no longer considered theologically correct.
