= Ebenezer (hymn tune) =

1897 hymn tune by Thomas John Williams

Ebenezer also known as Ton-y-Botel (Tune in a Bottle) is a famous Welsh hymn tune composed by Thomas John Williams A.T.S.C. (1869–1944) and extracted from the second movement of his anthem "Goleu Yn Y Glyn" (Light in the Valley).

The tune was first published in 1897 in the periodical Yr Athraw ('The Teacher'), vol. 71, in tonic sol-fa notation, and its first appearance in a hymnal was in 1900, in The Baptist Book of Praise.

The famed English composer and music historian Ralph Vaughan Williams (1872–1958) referred to this as one of the greatest hymn tunes. As the musical editor Vaughan Williams included it in The English Hymnal in 1906.

It is now published in 195 hymnals worldwide, including The New English Hymnal.

Ebenezer means "Stone of Help" in the Bible.

The tune is named after Ebenezer Chapel in Rhos near Pontardawe, South Wales, which T. J. Willams attended while composing the tune.

T. J. Williams was born in Llangiwg, Ynysmeudwy, near Pontardawe, and lived in Llanelli, South Wales, from 1903. He served as organist and choir director at Mount Elim Baptist Chapel, Ynysmeudwy near Pontardawe, for fifteen years, Zion Baptist Chapel, Llanelli, (1903–1911) and Calfaria Baptist Chapel, Llanelli (1913–1931).

He is buried in Llanelli District Cemetery (Box Cemetery).

The myth that the tune was discovered in a bottle on a Llyn Peninsula beach in North Wales was published in the Daily Mail in 1902. It has affectionately been known as Ton-y-Botel ever since and is even referred to as "Ebenezer, Ton-y-Botel" on his grave headstone, this also includes the first music phrase and below it the text "Dyma Gariad Fel Y Moroedd"

== Hymns ==
Many hymn texts are set to this tune. Among them are:

- "Dyma Gariad Fel Y Moroedd" (Here is Love, Vast as the Ocean) text by Gwilym Hiraethog (1802–1883), "Old and New Welsh and English Hymns" # 159
- "Once to Every Man and Nation" text by James Russell Lowell (1819–1891), "Presbyterian 1955 Hymnbook U.S.A." # 361
- "Oh the Deep, Deep Love of Jesus" text by Samuel Trevor Francis (1834–1925), "Worship and Rejoice Hymnal" # 398
- "Come, O Spirit, Dwell Among Us" text by Janie Alford. "Glory to God.The Presbyterian Hymnal U.S.A." # 280
- "God hath Spoken by the Prophets" text by George W Briggs. "United Methodist Hymnal U.S.A." # 108
- "Jesus, Tempted in the Desert" text by Herman G. Stuempfle.
- "Let My People Seek their Freedom" text by Herbert O'Driscoll. " The United Methodist Hymnal U.S.A" # 586
- "Singing Songs of Expectation" text by Bernhard Severin Ingemann / translator Sabine Baring-Gould, in "The Hymnal 1982 according to the use of the Episcopal Church" # 527
- "Thy Strong Word did Cleave the Darkness" text by Martin Franzmann in "The Hymnal 1982 according to the use of The Episcopal Church" # 381
- "Who is This, With Garments Gory" text by Arthur Cleveland Coxe. "Christian Science Hymnal" # 258.
- "Who is this so weak and helpless" with words by William Walsham How, first Bishop of Wakefield; New English Hymnal 474

== Secular usage ==
- Featured on numerous compilation CDs, cassettes and vinyl.
- Included on the modern CD "Duw A Wyr" (God only knows) as a new jazz arrangement. Track one.
- Featured in the three times Academy Awards nominated film "The Young Lions" starring Marlon Brando, Montgomery Clift and Dean Martin.
- Featured in the film " The Proud Valley " starring Paul Leroy Robeson (1898–1976) – The American Singer, Actor and Civil Rights Activist
- Michael Giacchino used it as an orchestral version named "Red Square" on the Call of Duty video game soundtrack.
- A variation of it named "Dublin" is included on the soundtrack of Anno 1503.

== Use in Brazil ==
In Brazil, this melody is used in several Christian hymns from different hymnals, both of which address the same subject: the request for strengthening the church.

- "Vivifica" text of "Salmos e Hinos" #552
- "Vem, Visita tua Igreja" text of "Cantor Cristão Hymnal" #580
- "Fortalece Tua Igreja" text of "Brazilian Lutheran hymnal" #298
- "Fortalece a Tua Igreja" text of "Brazilian Methodist Hymnal" #204
- "Vivifica a Tua Igreja" text of "Harpa Cristã hymnal"
- "Fortalece tua Igrej" text of "Cantai todos os Povos Hymnal" #151
- "Fortalece tua Igreja" text of "Novo Cântico hymnal" #229
- "Vem, Visita tua Igreja" text of "Seja Louvado" #314
- "Vivifica tua Igreja" text of "Cantai ao Senhor" #545
- "Oração pelo Brasil" text of "Cantai Ao Senhor" #547
- "Vivifica Tua Igreja" text of "Louvores ao Rei Hymnal" #148
- "Fortalece Tua Igreja" text of "Brazilian Seventh-day Adventist Hymnal" #506
- "Vivifica Tua Igreja" text of "Novo Louvores ao Rei Hymnal" #323
- "Fortalece tua Igreja" text of "New Brazilian Seventh-day Adventist Hymnal" #220
