= Trevor Francis (disambiguation) =

Trevor Francis (1954–2023) was an English footballer and manager.

Trevor Francis may also refer to:

- Trevor Francis, English singer and contestant on The Voice UK
- Trevor Francis, a member of the UK Music Hall of Fame

== See also ==
- Samuel Trevor Francis
