= Martin Franzmann =

American Lutheran clergyman and theologian

- Born: January 29, 1907; Lake City, Minnesota, U.S.
- Died: March 28, 1976 (aged 69); Wells, Somerset, England

Academic background
- Education: Northwestern College (BA)

Academic work
- Discipline: Theology
- Sub-discipline: Liturgy; Lutheranism; Poetry
- Institutions: Northwestern College; Concordia Seminary; Evangelical Lutheran Synodical Conference of North America; Westfield House

Martin H. Franzmann (January 29, 1907 – March 28, 1976) was an American Lutheran clergyman and theologian. He was also a college professor and poet who wrote numerous books and hymns.

== Early life and education ==
Martin Hans Franzmann was born in Lake City, Minnesota. He was the son of Rev. William Franzmann (1868–1953) and Else (Griebling) Franzmann (1875–1944). His father was an immigrant from Germany and was a Lutheran minister. Franzmann graduated from Northwestern College before entering Wisconsin Lutheran Seminary. He had also studied at the University of Chicago, but did not earn a degree. He later studied in Greece as a Daniel L. Shorey Traveling Fellow.

== Career ==
In 1936, Franzmann accepted the position to serve as a professor of Greek and English at Northwestern until the summer of 1946. In 1946, he was called to teach at Concordia Seminary in St. Louis, Missouri. In 1957, he became the chairman of Exegetical Theology at Concordia. He was notable for his traditional stance on Biblical inerrancy and inspiration against historical criticism well before the walkout that led to the Seminex crisis.

Among his other position was time as chair of the Synodical Conference, a member of the Commission on Theology and Church Relations of the Lutheran Church – Missouri Synod, and the 1962 LCMS representative to the Lutheran World Federation. He left the faculty of Concordia Seminary in 1969 to become tutor at Westfield House, the theological college of the Evangelical Lutheran Church of England (ELCE), in Cambridge, England.

== Later life and death ==
Franzmann retired from Westfield House in 1972 and moved to Wells, England, where he died in 1976. He was succeeded as tutor by his son John Franzmann.

== Hymns ==
=== Original ===
- "In Adam We Have All Been One"

- Lutheran Book of Worship (Minneapolis: Augsburg Publishing House, 1978), 372.
- Lutheran Service Book (St. Louis: Concordia Publishing House, 2006), 569.

- "O God, O Lord of Heaven and Earth"

- Lutheran Book of Worship (Minneapolis: Augsburg Publishing House, 1978), 396.
- Lutheran Service Book (St. Louis: Concordia Publishing House, 2006), 834.

- "O Kingly Love"

- Lutheran Worship (St. Louis: Concordia Publishing House, 1982), 346.

- "O Thou, Who Hast of Thy Pure Grace"

- Lutheran Book of Worship (Minneapolis: Augsburg Publishing House, 1978), 442.

- "Our Paschal Lamb That Sets Us Free"

- Lutheran Service Book (St. Louis: Concordia Publishing House, 2006), 473.

- "Preach You the Word"

- Lutheran Service Book (St. Louis: Concordia Publishing House, 2006), 586.

- "Thy Strong Word"

- Lutheran Book of Worship (Minneapolis: Augsburg Publishing House, 1978), 233.
- Lutheran Worship (St. Louis: Concordia Publishing House, 1982), 328.
- Lutheran Service Book (St. Louis: Concordia Publishing House, 2006), 578.

=== Translations ===
- "With High Delight Let Us Unite"; original text: Georg Vetter

- Lutheran Book of Worship (Minneapolis: Augsburg Publishing House, 1985), 140.
- Lutheran Service Book (St. Louis: Concordia Publishing House, 2006), 483.

- "Isaiah, Mighty Seer"; original text: Martin Luther

- Evangelical Lutheran Worship (Minneapolis: Augsburg Fortress, 2006).
- Lutheran Book of Worship (Minneapolis: Augsburg Publishing House, 1985), 528.
- The Lutheran Hymnal (St. Louis: Concordia Publishing House, 1941), 249.

- 'Rise Again, Ye Lion-Hearted"; original text: unknown

- The Lutheran Hymnal (St. Louis: Concordia Publishing House, 1941), 470.

== Books ==
- Follow Me: Discipleship According to Matthew; Concordia Publishing House, 1961. ISBN 0-7586-1826-3.
- Concordia Commentary: Romans; Concordia Publishing House, 1968. ISBN 0-570-04431-6.
- Pray For Joy; Concordia Publishing House, 1970. ISBN 0-570-03801-4.
- Concordia Study Bible with Notes; William Collins Sons & Co., Ltd., for Concordia Publishing House, 1971. ISBN 0-570-00500-0.
- The Word of the Lord Grows; Concordia Publishing House, 1972. ISBN 0-570-03222-9.
- The Revelation to John: A Commentary; Concordia Publishing House, 1986. ISBN 0-570-04430-8.
- Ha! Ha! Among the Trumpets; Concordia Publishing House, 1994. ISBN 0-570-04641-6.
