= The Present Crisis =

1845 poem by James Russell Lowell

- by James Russell Lowell
- Country: United States
- Language: English
- Subject(s): Mexican–American War
- Publication date: 1845; 180 years ago

Full text
- The Present Crisis at Wikisource

"The Present Crisis" is an 1845 poem by James Russell Lowell. It was written as a protest against the Mexican–American War. Decades later, it became the inspiration for the title of The Crisis, the magazine published by the National Association for the Advancement of Colored People.

== Composition and publication history ==
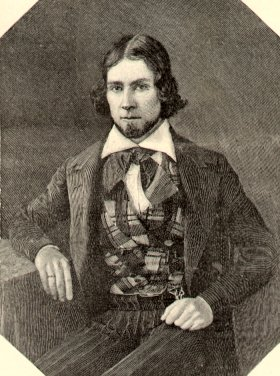
James Russell Lowell, c. 1844–1845

Lowell wrote the poem at a time when the United States government was considering the annexation of Texas as a state allowing slavery, which Lowell and others opposed because it would increase power in the South. Further, he worried that the precedent would be set to expand slavery into California and the southwest. In 1844, John Greenleaf Whittier, a poet actively working for the antislavery movement, asked Lowell to write a poem to inspire others. In a letter to Lowell, Whittier wrote: "Give me one that shall be to our cause what the song of Rouget de Lisle was to the French Republicans", referring to "La Marseillaise", now the national anthem of France.

The result was Lowell's poem, first published as "Verses Suggested by the Present Crisis" in the Boston Courier for December 11, 1845, before being included in his compilation Poems as "The Present Crisis" in 1848. The poem was immediately successful, both critically and among readers, in part by invoking the country's past as a way to remind people of the present day to strive to be on the right side of history. It rapidly became an anthem of the antislavery movement and was quoted by antislavery leaders such as William Lloyd Garrison and others. Modern scholar Marcus Wood has noted that "if abolition had a single poetic anthem then this was it".

Lowell also expressed the country's anxiety and distrust during the Mexican–American War in his 1848 satire, The Biglow Papers. In the book, which became immediately popular, Lowell used black comedy to depict what the war meant to the United States and proponents of slavery.

== Legacy ==
In the summer of 1910, when members of National Association for the Advancement of Colored People were preparing to create a magazine for the organization, Mary White Ovington mentioned Lowell's poem "The Present Crisis". A board member responded, "There is the name of your magazine." The publication was titled The Crisis, and W. E. B. Du Bois served as its first editor. Martin Luther King Jr. frequently quoted the poem in his speeches and sermons. The poem was also the source of the hymn "Once to Every Man and Nation".

On February 11, 2021, an excerpt from "The Present Crisis" was quoted by Dr. Barry Black as part of the opening prayer at the second impeachment trial of Donald Trump.
