= Sweet Exchange =

Studio album by Heather Payne
- Released: September 14, 2010
- Recorded: 2010
- Genre: Christian pop
- Label: Stylos

Sweet Exchange is the debut solo album by Heather Payne, founding member of Contemporary Christian group Point of Grace. The collection of hymns and worship songs was released on September 14, 2010, by Sandi Patty's Stylos label.

== Track listing ==
1. "Holy, Holy, Holy"
2. "O For A Thousand Tongues"
3. "Rock of Ages"
4. "Hallelujah, What A Savior"
5. "My Jesus"
6. "Sweet Exchange"
7. "O, The Deep, Deep Love" (featuring Terry Jones)
8. "Pass Me Not"
9. "Be Thou My Vision"
10. "Jesus Paid It All"
11. "Alas, My Savior Did Bleed"
12. "Come Ye Sinners"
13. "The Gospel Song"
