= O the Deep, Deep Love of Jesus =

Christian hymn written by Samuel Trevor Francis

- Hymn
- Written: 1875
- Text: by Samuel Trevor Francis
- Meter: 8.7.8.7 D
- Melody: "Ebenezer", Welsh hymn tune composed by Thomas John Williams A.T.S.C.

"O the Deep Deep, Love of Jesus" is a well-known Christian hymn, written by the London merchant Samuel Trevor Francis. Francis (1834–1925) had a spiritual turning point as a teenager, contemplating suicide one night on a bridge over the River Thames. Experiencing a renewal of faith, he went on to author many poems and hymns and was a preacher in addition to his merchant career.

The song compares Jesus' love to the ocean in scope, emphasizing the limitless, unchanging, and sacrificial nature of God's affections for the singer and all of humanity. It consists of three stanzas each utilizing an A, A, B, B rhyming structure. Various melodic and harmonic arrangements of the song have been published, the most common being a minor melody in 4/4 time.

== Versions ==
- Beecher Hymn tune by John Zundel and Henry Ward Beecher
- Pure Piano Panoramas (2000) by Jeff Bjorck. Uses a variation of the Ebenezer tune
- Hiding Place (2004) by Selah. Uses a variation of the Ebenezer tune
- "O the Deep, Deep Love of Jesus!" (2004) by David Ward
- Be Still My Soul (2006) by Ann Walsh (Ebenezer tune)
- Come Weary Saints (2008) by Sovereign Grace Music (text adapted by Bob Kauflin, music by Bob Kauflin)
- Sweet Exchange (2010) by Heather Payne and Terry Jones
- "Oh, the Deep Deep Love of Jesus" (2016) by Audrey Assad
- Oh, The Deep Love of Jesus (2019) by Simon Khorolskiy
- "Oh The Deep" (2026) by Sarah Tarry
