= George Nicholas Sanders =

American official and assassination suspect (1812–1873)

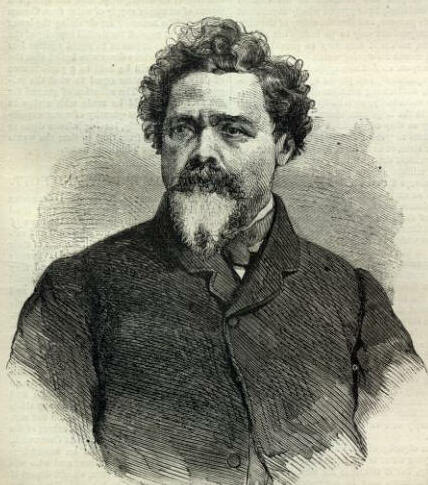
- Sketch of Sanders (1865)
- Born: February 1812; Lexington, Kentucky, United States
- Died: August 13, 1873 (aged 61); New York City, New York, United States
- Title: Consul in London
- Spouse: Anna Reid
- Children: Reid Sanders, Male, 1837–1864 Virginia N Sanders, Female, 1841–1866 Lewis Sanders, Male, 1844–1894
- Parent(s): Lewis Sanders and Ann Nicholas.

George Nicholas Sanders (February 1812 – August 13, 1873) was an American diplomat, publisher, and supporter of the Confederate States of America. Sanders was believed by some to have a level of involvement in the assassination of President Abraham Lincoln.

== Early life and career ==
Sanders was born in Lexington, Kentucky in February 1812. His father was Lewis Sanders, and his mother was Ann Nicholas.

During his early career he was involved in breeding cattle and race horses. Sanders later moved to New York, and married Anna Reid in 1836. His father-in-law was Samuel Chester Reid. He was involved in the Young America Movement and was editor of the "Democratic Review."

== Revolutionary ideas and causes ==
Sanders was appointed as Consul in London in 1853. Although he moved to London, he was never confirmed by the United States Senate, and recalled the following year. He publicly advocated for the assassination of heads of state, including French Emperor Napoleon III, and had previously been involved in schemes supporting revolutionaries on the European continent.

Sanders interacted with European revolutionaries such as Lajos Kossuth and Giuseppe Mazzini.

== Civil War ==
During the Civil War, he was involved in activities in Europe and Montreal to support the Confederacy. Sanders was involved in organization of the 1864 Niagara Falls peace conference, and negotiated with the United Kingdom to build ships for the Confederate States Navy.

Following Abraham Lincoln's 1865 assassination by John Wilkes Booth, the Judge Advocate General of the United States Army, Joseph Holt, became convinced that the plot was organized by leadership of the Confederate States of America. Sanders was among these leaders who Holt accused of involvement, and a reward of $25,000 was created for his arrest. It was dropped in November, after Sanders had not yet been apprehended.

== Later life ==
After the assassination of Lincoln, attempts were made to take Sanders into custody, but he fled to Canada and Europe. In 1870, he was in Paris, where he attempted to aid the city's defenders during the Prussian siege:

Mr. George Sanders, whilom United States Consul in London, and one of the leaders of the ex-Confederacy, is here; he is preparing plans for a system of rifle pits and zigzags outside the fortifications, at the request of General Trochu. Mr. Sanders, who took an active part in the defence of Richmond, declares that Paris is impregnable, if it be only well defended. He complains, however, that the French will not use the spade.

He later returned to the United States and died on August 13, 1873, in New York. He is buried in an unmarked grave in Greenwood Cemetery in Brooklyn, New York.

== In popular culture ==
Sanders was portrayed by Anthony Marble in the 2024 Apple TV+ miniseries series Manhunt.
