= Maria White Lowell =

American poet and abolitionist

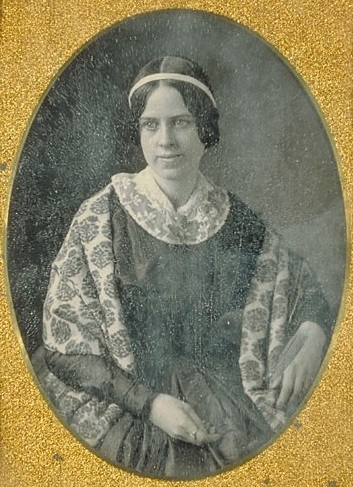
- Maria White Lowell (1845)
- Born: Maria White; July 8, 1821; Watertown, Massachusetts, U.S.
- Died: October 27, 1853 (aged 32); Cambridge, Massachusetts, U.S.
- Resting place: Mount Auburn Cemetery
- Occupations: Poet, abolitionist
- Spouse: James Russell Lowell (m. 1844)
- Children: 4

Maria White Lowell (July 8, 1821 – October 27, 1853) was an American poet and abolitionist. Her poems were privately printed by her husband, James Russell Lowell, the poet, two years after her death.

== Early life ==
Maria White was born in Watertown, Massachusetts, to a middle-class, intellectual family. She was raised under a strict ascetic discipline at an Ursuline convent which was burned by a mob in 1834.

== Career ==
Lowell became involved in the temperance movement and was a supporter of women's rights. On November 6, 1839, she was one of the local women who attended the first "conversation" organized by women's rights advocate Margaret Fuller.

The same year, Maria White's brother William introduced her to his Harvard College classmate, James Russell Lowell. The two became engaged in the autumn of 1840. However, her father Abijah White, a wealthy merchant, insisted that the wedding be postponed until Lowell had gainful employment.

In the winter of 1843–44, Maria White and her mother left the bleak neighborhood of Boston to spend the spring in the milder climate of Philadelphia. It happened that they went to a Friend's boarding-house in the city, and through the kind interest of their hostess, "Friend Parker", made the acquaintance of others, who introduced the Whites into other Friend homes. The Whites had no knowledge of Quakerism, but their simple sincere natures found much in common with members of that religion who in turn enjoyed getting to know the Whites. Strong friendships followed, and as a natural result of these, Maria White's tendency towards the antislavery movement, then in its unpopular beginnings, was strengthened and continued. When the weather grew warmer, and the east winds of New England had lessened, the mother and daughter returned to Watertown. Maria White was urged to remain longer in Philadelphia, and visit some of her new friends in their own homes, but her reply was characteristic: "No, no. I have left one in Cambridge who makes even the east wind warm for me." She was referring to James Russell Lowell, her fiancé.

Shortly after Lowell published Conversations on the Old Poets, a collection of his previously published essays, the couple married on December 26, 1844, at her father's house. The new husband believed she was made up "half of earth and more than of Heaven". A friend described their relationship as "the very picture of a True Marriage".

White, who became involved in movements against intemperance and slavery, joined the Boston Female Anti-Slavery Society and persuaded Lowell to become an abolitionist. The new Mrs. Lowell, however, was in poor health and the couple moved to Philadelphia shortly after their marriage in the hopes she would be healed there.

In 1845, the newly married pair came again to Philadelphia, and it was arranged that Mr. Lowell would do some editorial work on the Pennsylvania'a Freeman, an antislavery weekly of that city and also make regular contributions to the Antislavery Standard. Before leaving Philadelphia, the Lowells had their daguerreotypes taken by Langenheim. These were the only pictures taken in their early married life. In the spring of 1845, the Lowells returned to Cambridge, Massachusetts to make their home at Elmwood in Cambridge, Massachusetts. They had four children, though only one survived past infancy. Their first, Blanche, was born December 31, 1845, but lived only fifteen months; Rose, born in 1849, survived only a few months as well; their only son, Walter, was born in 1850 but died in 1852. Only their fourth child, Mabel, survived to adulthood.

=== Death ===
Frail, delicate, and plagued by weak lungs and ill-health throughout her life, Maria White Lowell died on October 27, 1853, at the age of 32 in Cambridge, Massachusetts. She is buried with her husband in Mount Auburn Cemetery. A volume of her poems was printed privately after her death (Cambridge, 1855). The best known of them are "The Alpine Shepherd" and "The Morning-Glory."

== Critical response and influence ==
In 1870, when Emily Dickinson first met Thomas Wentworth Higginson, he mentioned the poetry of Maria White Lowell. Dickinson asked to know more and she may have been inspired by her work. One of Lowell's poems, "The Sick Room", has been described as "Dickinsonian". Her poem "The Grave of Keats" was published in the 1874 anthology Poems of Places, edited by former neighbor Henry Wadsworth Longfellow.

Amy Lowell, a descendant of the family, praised Maria Lowell's writing: "That is poetry! It is better than anything her husband ever wrote, and he always said that she was a better poet than he."

== Quotes ==
- "Two souls with but a single thought, two hearts that beat as one." – translated by Lowell from Bellinghausen's drama, "Der Sohn der Wildnis (1842)" into the play Ingomar the Barbarian
