= Young America movement =

Political and cultural movement in the U.S. during the mid-nineteenth century

The Young America Movement was an American political, cultural and literary movement in the mid-19th century. Inspired by European reform movements of the 1830s (such as Junges Deutschland, Young Italy and Young Hegelians), the American group was formed as a political organization in 1845 by Edwin de Leon and George Henry Evans. It advocated free trade, social reform, expansion westward and southward into the territories, and support for republican, anti-aristocratic movements abroad. The movement also inspired a drive for self-consciously "American" literature in writers such as Nathaniel Hawthorne, Herman Melville, and Walt Whitman. It became a faction in the Democratic Party in the 1850s. Senator Stephen A. Douglas promoted its nationalistic program in an unsuccessful effort to compromise sectional differences. The breakup of the movement left many of its adherents discouraged and disillusioned.

John L. O'Sullivan described the general purpose of the Young America Movement in an 1837 editorial for the Democratic Review:

All history is to be re-written; political science and the whole scope of all moral truth have to be considered and illustrated in the light of the democratic principle. All old subjects of thought and all new questions arising, connected more or less directly with human existence, have to be taken up again and re-examined.

Historian Edward L. Widmer places O'Sullivan and the Democratic Review in New York City at the center of the Young America Movement. In that sense, the movement can be considered mostly urban and middle class, but with a strong emphasis on socio-political reform for all Americans, especially given the burgeoning European immigrant population (particularly Irish Catholics) in New York in the 1840s.

== Politics ==
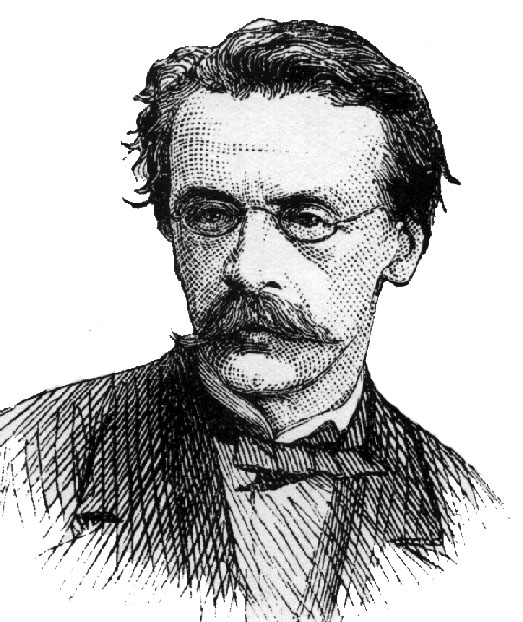
John L. O'Sullivan (1874)

Historian Yonatan Eyal argues that the 1840s and 1850s were the heyday of the faction of young Democrats that called itself "Young America". Led by Stephen Douglas, James K. Polk and Franklin Pierce, and New York financier August Belmont, this faction broke with the agrarian and strict constructionist orthodoxies of the past and embraced commerce, technology, regulation, reform, and internationalism.

In economic policy Young America saw the necessity of a modern infrastructure of railroads, canals, telegraphs, turnpikes, and harbors; they endorsed the "Market Revolution" and promoted capitalism. They called for Congressional land grants to the states, which allowed Democrats to claim that internal improvements were locally rather than federally sponsored. Young America claimed that modernization would perpetuate the agrarian vision of Jeffersonian Democracy by allowing yeomen farmers to sell their products and therefore to prosper. They tied internal improvements to free trade, while accepting moderate tariffs as a necessary source of government revenue. They supported the Independent Treasury (the Jacksonian alternative to the Second Bank of the United States), not as a scheme to quash the special privilege of the Whiggish moneyed elite, but as a device to spread prosperity to all Americans.

The movement's decline by 1856 was due to unsuccessful challenges to "old fogy" leaders like James Buchanan, to Douglas' failure to win the presidential nomination in 1852, to an inability to deal with the slavery issue, and to rising isolationism and disenchantment with reform in America.

=== Manifest Destiny ===
When O'Sullivan coined the term "Manifest Destiny" in an 1845 article for the Democratic Review, he did not necessarily intend for American democracy to expand across the continent by force. In effect, the American democratic principle was to spread on its own, self-evident merits. The American exceptionalism often attached to O'Sullivan's "Manifest Destiny" was an 1850s perversion that can be attributed to what Widmer called "Young America II". O'Sullivan even contended that American "democracy needed to expand in order to contain its ideological opponent (aristocracy)". Unlike Europe, America had no aristocratic system or nobility against which Young America could define itself.

=== Literature ===
Aside from Young America's promotion of Jacksonian Democracy in the Democratic Review, the movement also had a literary side. It attracted a circle of outstanding writers, including William Cullen Bryant, George Bancroft, Herman Melville, and Nathaniel Hawthorne. They sought independence from European standards of high culture and wanted to demonstrate the excellence and "exceptionalism" of America's own literary tradition. Other writers of the movement included Evert Augustus Duyckinck, Cornelius Mathews, It was Mathews that adopted the name for the movement. In a speech delivered June 30, 1845, he said:

Whatever that past generation of statesmen, law-givers and writers was capable of, we know. What they attained, what they failed to attain, we also know. Our duty and our destiny is another from theirs. Liking not at all its borrowed sound, we are yet (there is no better way to name it,) the Young America of the people: a new generation; and it is for us now to inquire, what we may have it in our power to accomplish, and on what objects the world may reasonably ask that we should fix our regards.

One of Young America's intellectual vehicles was the literary journal Arcturus. Herman Melville in his book Mardi (1849) refers to it by naming a ship in the book Arcturion and observing that it was "exceedingly dull", and that its crew had a low literary level. The North American Review referred to the movement as "at war with good taste".

=== Hudson River School ===
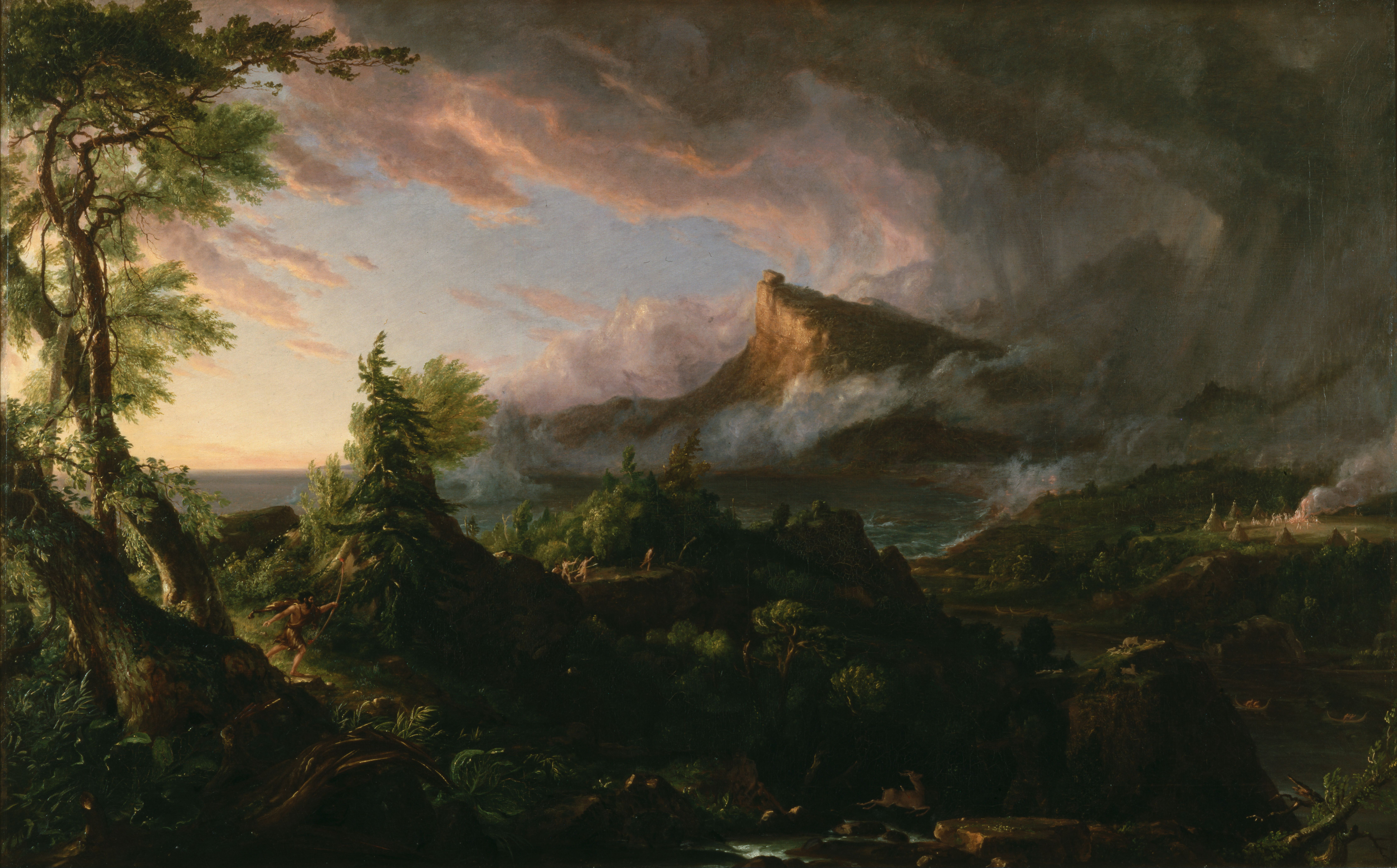
The Course of Empire: The Savage State by Thomas Cole (1836)

Apart from literature, there was a distinct element of art associated with the Young America Movement. In the 1820s and 1830s, American artists such as Asher B. Durand and Thomas Cole began to emerge. They were heavily influenced by romanticism, which resulted in numerous paintings involving the physical landscape. But it was William Sidney Mount who had connections to the writers of the Democratic Review. And as a contemporary of the Hudson River School, he sought to use art in the promotion of the American democratic principle. O'Sullivan's cohort at the Review, E. A. Duyckinck, was particularly "eager to launch an ancillary artistic movement" that supplemented Young America.

== Young America II ==
In late 1851, the Democratic Review was acquired by George Nicholas Sanders. Similar to O'Sullivan, Sanders believed in the inherent value of a literary-political relationship, whereby literature and politics could be combined and used as an instrument for socio-political progress. Although he "brought O'Sullivan back into the fold as an editor", the periodical's "jingoism achieved an even higher pitch than O'Sullivan's [original] dog-whistle stridency". Even Democratic Representative John C. Breckinridge remarked in 1852:

The Democratic Review has been heretofore not a partisan paper, but a periodical that was supposed to represent the whole Democratic Party ... I have observed recently a very great change.

The change in tone and partisanship in the Democratic Review that Breckinridge referred to was mostly a reaction by the increasingly divided Democratic Party to the growth of the Free Soil movement, which threatened to dissolve any semblance of Democratic unity that remained.

=== Rise of Labor Republicanism ===
By the mid-1850s, Free Soil Democrats (those who followed David Wilmot and his Proviso) and anti-slavery Whigs had combined to form the Republican Party. Young America's New York Democrats who opposed slavery saw an opportunity to express their abolitionist sentiments. As a result, Horace Greeley's New York Tribune began to replace the Democratic Review as the central outlet for Young America's ever-evolving politics. In fact, Greeley's Tribune became a major advocate of not only abolition, but also of land and labor reform.

The combined cause of land and labor reform was perhaps best exemplified by George Henry Evans' National Reform Association (NRA). In 1846, Evans stated:

National Reformers did not consider the Freedom of the Soil a panacea for every social and political wrong, but a necessary step in progress which would greatly facilitate all desirable reform, and without which no plan of reform could prevent the downward course of labor.

Eventually, former members of the radical Locofoco faction in the Democratic Party recognized the potential for reorganizing New York City's labor system around principles such as the common good. In contrast to the Europe in the days of the 1848 revolutions, America had no aristocratic establishment against which Young America could define itself in protest.

== See also ==
- David Dudley Field II
- Popular sovereignty in the United States
- Henry David Thoreau
- Walt Whitman

== Cited sources ==
- Danbom, David B. (September 1974). "The Young America Movement", Journal of the Illinois State Historical Society. Vol. 67, Issue 3, pp. 294–306.
- Eyal, Yonatan. (2007). The Young America Movement and the Transformation of the Democratic Party 1828–1861. ISBN 9781139466691 Cambridge University Press.
- Lause, Mark A. (2005). Young America: Land, Labor, and the Republican Community. (University of Illinois Press) online.
- Widmer, Edward L. (1999). Young America: The Flowering of Democracy in New York City New York: Oxford University Press ISBN 0-19-514062-1. online copy
