= Westfield House =

Lutheran theological college in Cambridge, England, UK

Coordinates: 52.21518°N 0.10898°E

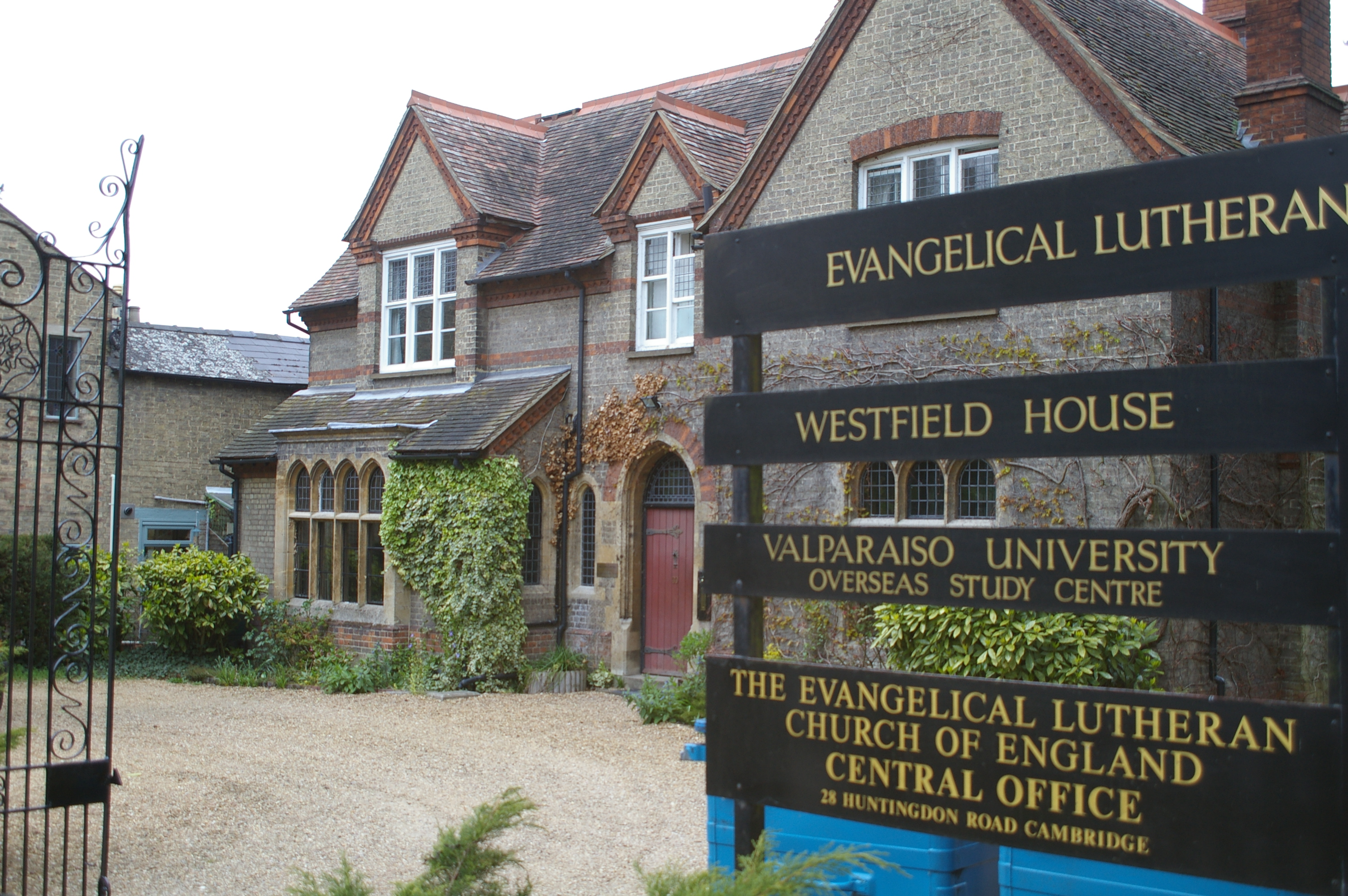
Westfield House

Westfield House is a Lutheran theological college in Cambridge, England. Founded in 1962, it is the theological studies centre of the Evangelical Lutheran Church of England (ELCE) and is part of the Cambridge Theological Federation. The central office of the ELCE is at Westfield House.

The courses offered by Westfield House include training for candidates for the Lutheran ministry and one-semester study abroad courses for foreign students. Westfield House is an Affiliate Centre of the University of London International Programmes, and its students can attend lectures at Cambridge University.

Westfield House has an academic library whose collection focuses on Martin Luther, Lutheranism and the Reformation, and is used by other institutions in the Cambridge Theological Federation. The Chapel of Saint Titus at Westfield House is used by its staff and students, and also by the local Lutheran congregation, Resurrection Lutheran Church.

Accommodation for students and visiting scholars is available in and near Westfield House.

The Principal of Westfield House is Cynthia E. Lumley, who was appointed in 2013.
