= Once to Every Man and Nation =

Hymn based on poem by James Russell Lowell

"Once to Every Man and Nation" is a hymn based upon the poem "The Present Crisis" by James Russell Lowell.

The original poem was written as a protest against the Mexican–American War.

The hymn was written to the tune of Ebenezer (hymn) by Thomas J. Williams in 1890, though it has sometimes been published with a different tune (for instance, the 1956 Baptist Hymnal sets it to "Austrian Hymn").
