= Samuel Trevor Francis =

English lay preacher and hymn writer (1834–1925)

Samuel Trevor Francis (19 November 1834 – 28 December 1925) was an English lay preacher and hymn writer, with the Plymouth Brethren. He is best known as the author of the hymn "Oh the Deep, Deep Love of Jesus". He earned his living as a merchant.
