= Charles Frederick Briggs =

American journalist, author and editor

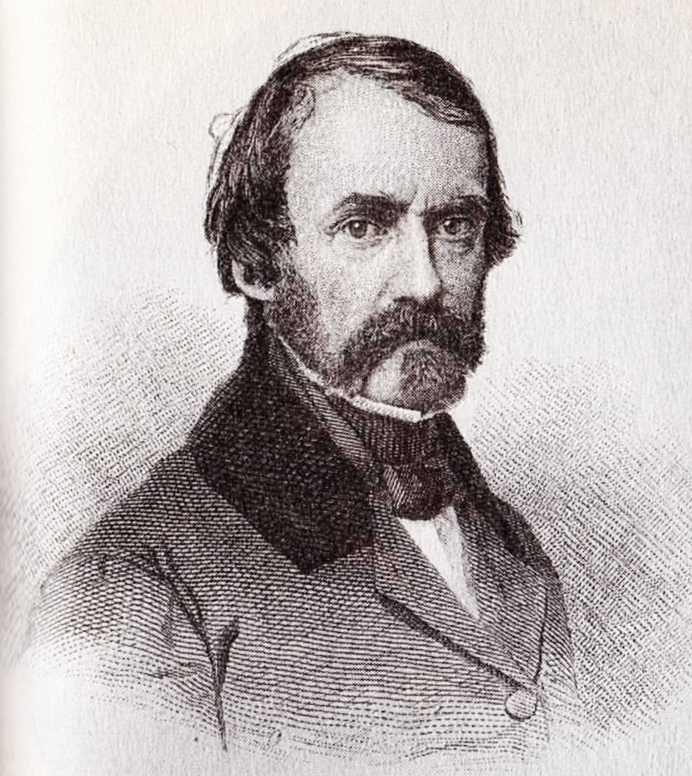
- Born: December 30, 1804; Nantucket, Massachusetts, U.S.
- Died: June 20, 1877 (aged 72); New York City, U.S.

Charles Frederick Briggs (December 30, 1804 – June 20, 1877), also called C. F. Briggs, was an American journalist, author and editor, born in Nantucket, Massachusetts. He was also known under the pseudonym "Harry Franco", having written The Adventures of Harry Franco in 1839, which was followed by a series of works dealing more or less humorously with life in New York City.

== Biography ==
Briggs had been a sailor in Nantucket, Massachusetts, then a wholesale grocer. When his novel The Adventures of Harry Franco was suddenly successful, he pursued a career in journalism. The publication of this humorous adventure story in 1839 was an immediate sensation and led to even his friends nicknaming him "Franco", much to his dismay. In The Knickerbocker, Briggs began a series of humorous writings, including a serialized story that, though incomplete, was produced as the novel The Haunted Merchant in 1843.

Briggs founded the Copyright Club in 1843. The organization sought to spread awareness of the need for international copyright law, though Briggs left the Club when a magazine named Centurion "contrived to monopolize all the credit".

Briggs started the Broadway Journal in 1844 in New York City. He handled editorial duties and solicited for publications while his business partner, former schoolteacher John Bisco, handled publishing and financial concerns. One of his contributors was his friend James Russell Lowell, though Briggs disapproved of Lowell's "hot and excited" abolitionism. In December 1844, Lowell wrote to Briggs to recommend Edgar Allan Poe for a job at the new magazine. Poe became associate editor of the publication in January 1845 and co-editor a month later, also becoming one-third owner. Though Poe was a partial owner of the journal, Briggs never considered him a partner but "only an assistant". Poe called Briggs "grossly uneducated" and said that he "has never composed in his life three consecutive sentences of grammatical English." In June 1845, Briggs resigned due to financial difficulties and, in October, Bisco sold his part of the magazine to Poe for $50 (Poe paid with a note endorsed by Horace Greeley). The magazine's final publication was dated January 3, 1846.

C. F. Briggs later worked as editor for several other publications including Holden's Dollar Magazine and as managing editor for Putnam's Magazine (1853-1856) in connection with associate editors George William Curtis and Parke Godwin. With Curtis and Godwin, he also produced a gift book called The Homes of American Authors (1852). Later he served on the staff of the Times, the Evening Mirror, the Brooklyn Union, and, finally, the Independent. Briggs died on June 20, 1877, in Brooklyn.

== Critical response ==
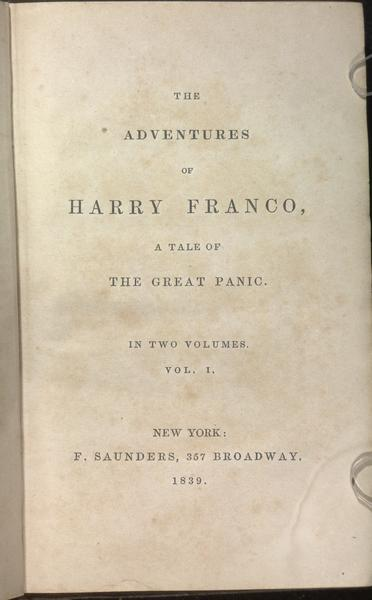
The Adventures of Harry Franco

Lowell wrote of Briggs in his A Fable for Critics: "He's in joke half the time when he seems to be sternest / When he seems to be joking, be sure he's in earnest". He went on:

...as he draws near
You find that's a smile you took for a sneer;
One half of him contradicts t'other; his wont
Is to say very sharp things and do very blunt,
His manners as hard as his feelings are tender.

Later, Lowell wrote to him in 1844, "You Gothamites strain hard to attain a metropolitan character, but I think if you felt very metropolitan you would not be showing it on all occasions".

== Selected list of works ==
- The Adventures of Harry Franco: A Tale of the Great Panic (1839)
- The Haunted Merchant or Bankrupt Stories (1843)
- Working a Passage, or Life in a Liner (1844)
- The Trippings of Tom Pepper; or, The Results of Romancing, an Autobiography (1847)
- Asmodeus; or, The iniquities of New York (1849)
