= Knickerbocker Club =

Social club in New York City

Coordinates: 40°45′57.23″N 73°58′17.28″W

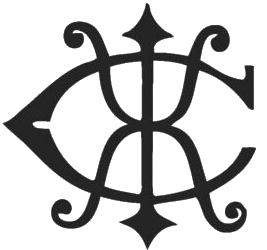

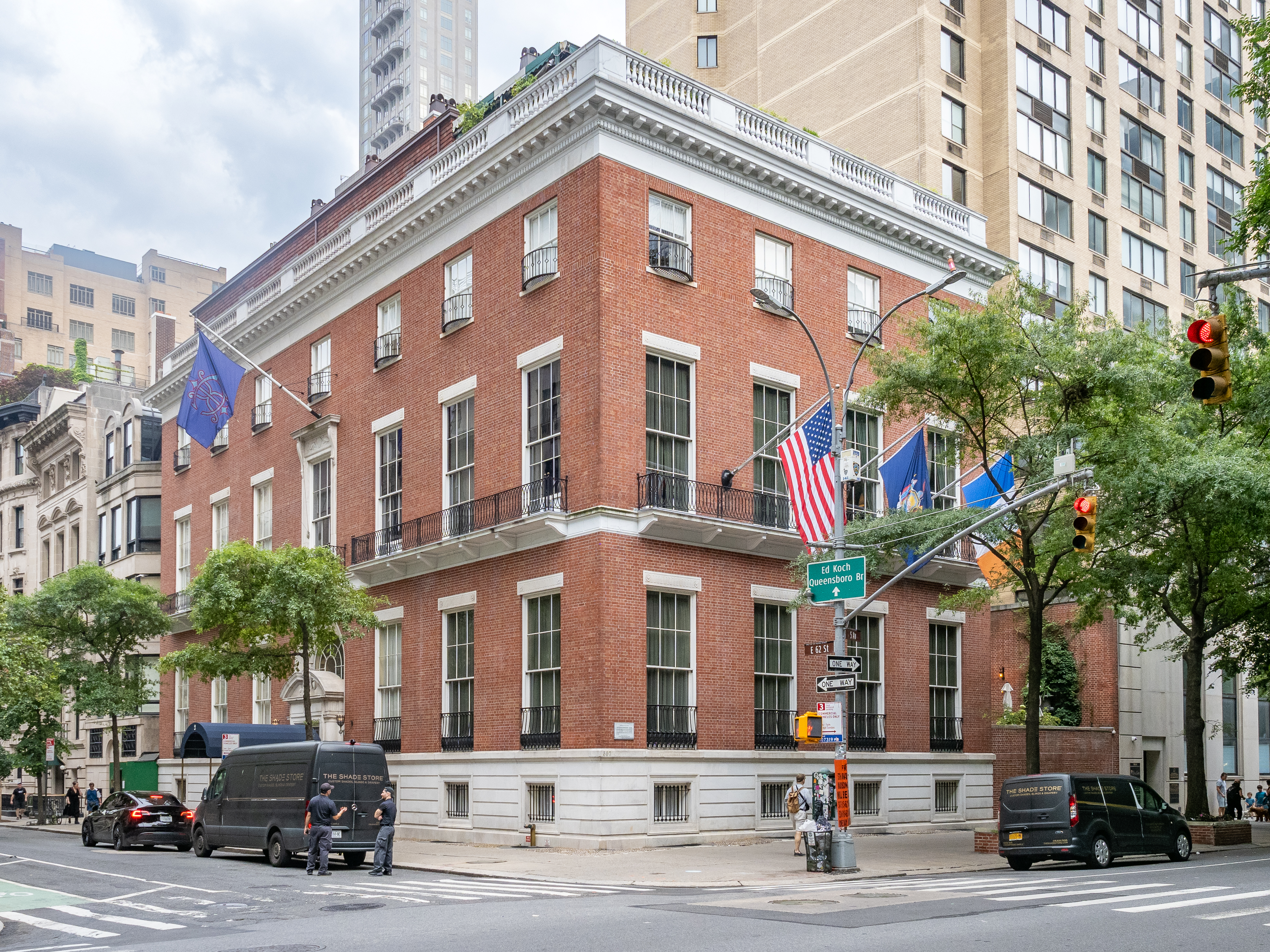
- The Knickerbocker Club in 2024
- Formation: 1871
- Type: Private social club
- Location(s): 2 East 62nd Street New York, New York

The Knickerbocker Club (known informally as The Knick) is a gentlemen's club in New York City that was founded in 1871. It is considered to be the most exclusive club in the United States and one of the most aristocratic gentlemen's clubs in the world.

The term Knickerbocker arose partly due to the use of the pen name Diedrich Knickerbocker by writer Washington Irving, and was a byword for a New York patrician, comparable to a "Boston Brahmin".

== History ==
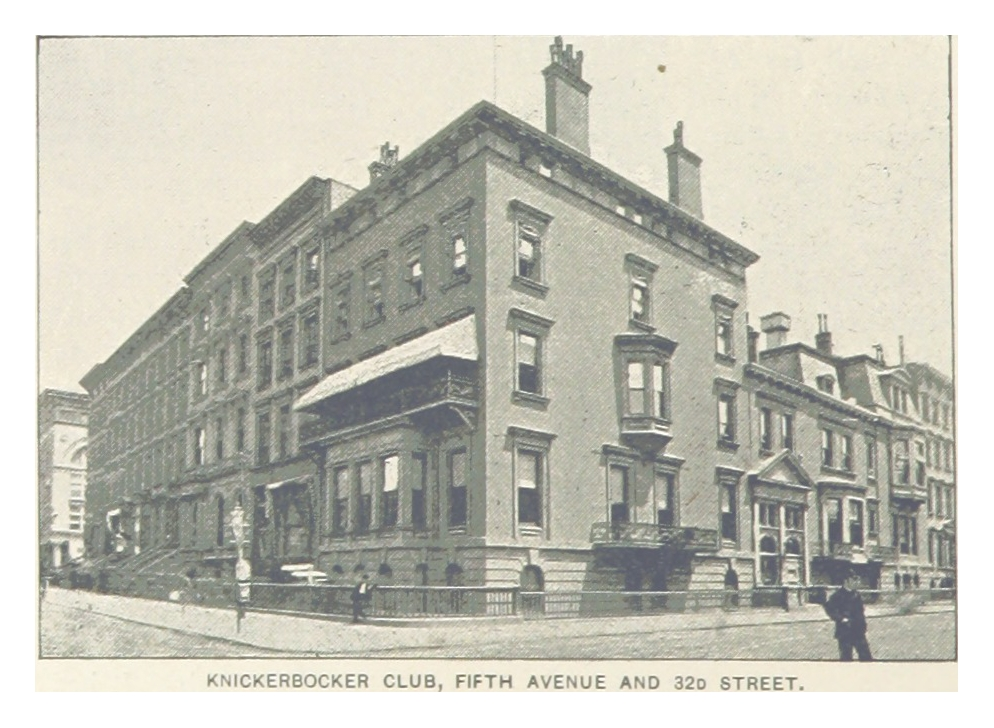
The 1882 clubhouse, located at Fifth Avenue and 32nd Street

The Knickerbocker Club was founded in 1871 by members of the Union Club of the City of New York who were concerned that the club's admission standards had fallen. By the 1950s, urban social club membership was dwindling, in large part because of the movement of wealthy families to the suburbs. In 1959, the Knickerbocker Club considered rejoining the Union Club, merging its 550 members with the Union Club's 900 men, but the plan never came to fruition.

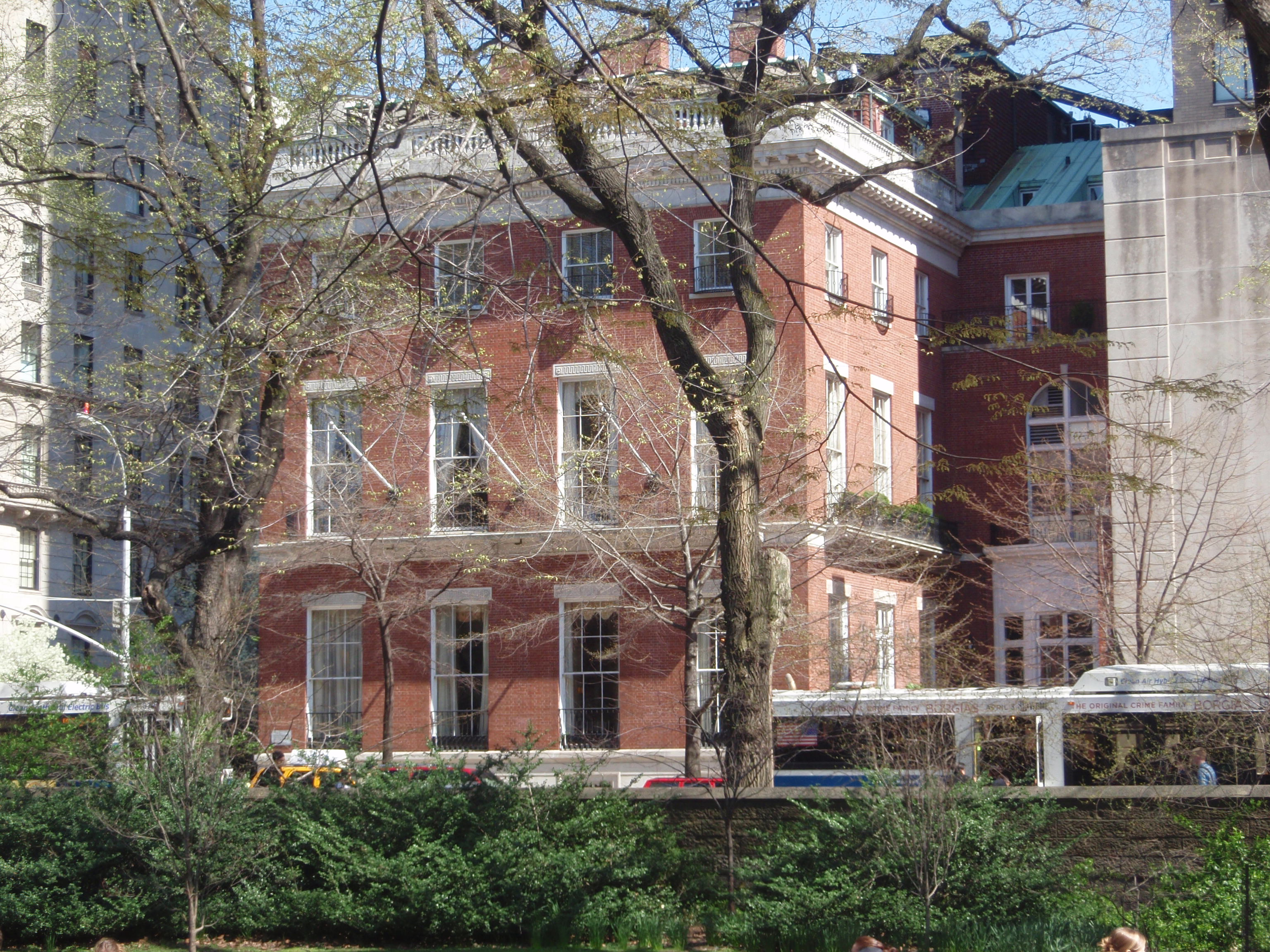
The current clubhouse at 2 East 62nd Street, photographed in 2011

The Knick's current clubhouse, a neo-Georgian structure at 2 East 62nd Street, was commissioned in 1913 and completed in 1915, on the site of the former mansion of Josephine Schmid, a wealthy widow. It was designed by William Adams Delano and Chester Holmes Aldrich, and it has been designated a city landmark.

== Membership ==
Members of the Knickerbocker Club are almost exclusively descendants of British and Dutch aristocratic families that governed the early 1600s American Colonies or that left the Old Continent for political reasons (e.g. partisans of the Royalist coalition against Cromwell, such as the "distressed Cavaliers" of the aristocratic Virginia settlers), or current members of the international aristocracy. Towards the middle of the 20th century, however, the club opened its door to a few descendants of the Gilded Age's prominent families, such as members of the Rockefeller family.

E. Digby Baltzell explains in his 1971 book Philadelphia Gentlemen: The Making of a National Upper Class:

The circulation of elites in America and the assimilation of new men of power and influence into the upper class takes place primarily through the medium of urban clubdom. Aristocracy of birth is replaced by an aristocracy of ballot. Frederick Lewis Allen showed how this process operated in the case of the nine Lords of Creation who were listed in the New York Social Register as of 1905: “The nine men who were listed [in the Social Register] were recorded as belonging to 9.4 clubs apiece,” wrote Allen. “Though only two of them, J. P. Morgan and Cornelius Vanderbilt III, belonged to the Knickerbocker Club, the citadel of Patrician families (indeed, both already belonged to old prominent families at the time), Stillman and Harriman joined these two in the membership of the almost equally fashionable Union Club; Baker joined these four in the membership of the Metropolitan Club of New York (magnificent, but easier of access to new wealth); John D. Rockefeller, William Rockefeller Jr., and Rogers, along with Morgan and Baker were listed as members of the Union League Club (the stronghold of Republican respectability); seven of the group belonged to the New York Yacht Club. Morgan belonged to nineteen clubs in all; Vanderbilt, to fifteen; Harriman, to fourteen.” Allen then goes on to show how the descendants of these financial giants were assimilated into the upper class: “By way of footnote, it may be added that although in that year [1905] only two of our ten financiers belonged to the Knickerbocker Club, in 1933 the grandsons of six of them did. The following progress is characteristic: John D. Rockefeller, Union League Club; John D. Rockefeller Jr., University Club; John D. Rockefeller 3rd, Knickerbocker Club. Thus is the American aristocracy recruited.”

Christopher Doob wrote in his book Social Inequality and Social Stratification in U.S. Society:

Personal wealth has never been the sole basis for attaining membership in exclusive clubs. The individual and family must meet the admissions committee's standards for values and behavior. Old money prevails over new money as the Rockefeller family experience suggests. John D. Rockefeller, the family founder and the nation's first billionaire, joined the Union League Club, a fairly respectable but not top-level club; John D. Rockefeller Jr., belonged to the University Club, a step up from his father; and finally his son John D. Rockefeller, III, reached the pinnacle with his acceptance into the Knickerbocker Club (Baltzell 1989, 340).

== Selected notable members ==
- Charles Francis Adams III (1866–1954), Ambassador, great-grandson of the sixth U.S. president John Quincy Adams (1767–1848), and a great-great-grandson of the second U.S. president and Founding Father John Adams (1735–1826). Member of the prominent Adams family
- His Royal Highness Prince Amyn Aga Khan, Imam of Nizari Ismailism
- His Royal Highness Prince Sadruddin Aga Khan (1933–2003), Imam of Nizari Ismailism. Statesman and activist who served as United Nations High Commissioner for Refugees from 1966 to 1977
- Gianni Agnelli (1921–2003), principal shareholder of Fiat, and Italian Senator for life. He is the great-great-grandson of business magnate Giuseppe Francesco Agnelli (1789–1865) of the Agnelli family. Through his mother Princess Virginia Bourbon del Monte he is also a member of the Princely House of Bourbon del Monte Santa Maria
- Winthrop W. Aldrich (1885–1974), United States Ambassador to the United Kingdom and scion of the prominent political Aldrich family. Son of the influential Senator Nelson W. Aldrich (1841–1915) who was referred to by the press and public alike as the "general manager of the Nation." Descendant of John Winthrop (1587–1649)
- Baron Carlo Amato (1938–2021), Ambassador of The Sovereign Military Hospitaller Order of Saint John of Jerusalem of Rhodes and of Malta
- Chester Alan Arthur II (1864–1937), sportsman, art connoisseur, and son of U.S. president Chester A. Arthur (1829–1886). Descendant of General Uriah Stone, who served in the Continental Army during the American Revolution
- Count Alessandro Guiccioli de Asarta (1843–1922), Senator of the Kingdom of Italy and Congressman of the Kingdom of Italy
- Waldorf Astor, 2nd Viscount Astor (1879–1952), British politician and member of the House of Lords. Great-great-great-grandson of John Jacob Astor, the richest man in America at the time. Member of the prominent Astor family
- Robert Bacon (1860–1919), United States secretary of state then U.S. Ambassador to France. Scion of the Boston Brahmin Bacon family whose members included philosopher and scientist Viscount Francis Bacon (1561–1626), U.S. senator and Chief of Justice Ezekiel Bacon (1776–1870), and Massachusetts Congressman John Bacon (1738–1820)
- Arthur Balfour, 1st Earl of Balfour (1848–1930), Prime Minister of the United Kingdom, then First Lord of the Admiralty. Often associated to the Balfour Declaration, public statement issued by the British government in 1917 announcing support for the establishment of a "national home for the Jewish people" in Palestine
- His Royal Highness Prince Franz von Bayern, Duke of Bavaria, head of the House of Wittelsbach
- Count Guerin De Beaumont (1896–1955), French diplomat and active member of the Bilderberg Group. Member of the House of de Beaumont
- His Royal Highness Count Folke Bernadotte of Wisborg (1895–1948), diplomat and grandson of King of Sweden Oscar II. In World War II he negotiated the release of about 31,000 prisoners from German concentration camps. After the war, Bernadotte was unanimously chosen to be the United Nations Security Council mediator in the Arab–Israeli conflict of 1947–1948
- Anthony Joseph Drexel Biddle Jr. (1897–1961), General and U.S. Ambassador to seven countries. Scion of the prominent Biddle family
- Francis Beverly Biddle, attorney general and Nuremberg judge (1886–1968). Scion of the prominent Biddle family
- Prince Livio Borghese (1874–1939), Italian Diplomat in the Ottoman Empire and in China. Scion of the Princely Borghese House
- John Moors Cabot (1901–1981), U.S. ambassador to five nations during the Truman, Eisenhower, and Kennedy administrations. Descendant of John Cabot (born 1680), a highly successful merchant of the prominent Boston Brahmin Cabot family
- John Lambert Cadwalader (1836–1914), United States secretary of state. Descendant of John Cadwalader (1742–1786) (general during the American Revolutionary War, who served with George Washington) and Thomas Cadwalader (1707–1779). Member of the prominent Cadwalader family and Van Cortlandt family
- His Royal Highness Prince Alfonso, Count of Caserta (1841–1934), pretender to the throne of the Kingdom of the Two Sicilies
- Adna Chaffee (1842–1914), General and Chief of Staff of the United States Army, taking part in the American Civil War and American Indian Wars, playing a key role in the Spanish–American War, and fighting in the Boxer Rebellion in China. Descendant of Thomas Chaffee (1610–1683), businessman and landowner of the Massachusetts Colony, and scion of the Boston Brahmin Chaffee family
- William A. Chanler (1867–1934), explorer, soldier and New York politician. Descendant of Edward Sutton, 2nd Baron Dudley (1460–1531), Member of Parliament of England, John Winthrop (1587–1649), one of the founders of the Massachusetts Bay Colony, and Peter Stuyvesant, the last Dutch Director of New Netherland from 1647 to 1664, after which it was renamed New York
- Count Ghislain Clauzel (1907–1992), French Ambassador. Descendant of Count Bertrand Clauzel (1772–1842), Marshal of France during the Napoleonic Wars
- Charles A. Coffin (1844–1926), co-founder and first president of General Electric corporation. Descendant of Tristram Coffin (1609–1681), a British aristocrat who had to flee the English Civil War and who is best known for purchasing Nantucket. Scion of the prominent Coffin family
- Calvin Coolidge (1872–1933), 30th president of the United States. During his presidency, he is known to have restored public confidence in the White House after the many scandals of his predecessor's administration. He was a direct descendant of John Coolidge (1604–1691), a member of the English landed gentry who emigrated to Massachusetts in 1630 and a member of the Boston Brahmin Coolidge family
- Pierre de Cossé Brissac, 12th Duke of Brissac (1900–1993), French aristocrat and author who wrote a series of historical memoirs. Head of the House of Cossé-Brissac
- Frank Crowninshield (1872–1947), journalist, developer of Vanity Fair, scion of the Boston Brahmin Crowninshield family whose members include Massachusetts governor John Crownshield (1649–1699) and Secretary of the Navy Benjamin Williams Crowninshield (1772–1851).
- Harvey Cushing (1869–1939), American neurosurgeon, pioneer of brain surgery who was the first exclusive neurosurgeon and the first person to describe Cushing's disease. Scion on the Cushing family whose notable members include American Founding Father Thomas Cushing III (1725–1788), William Cushing (1732–1810) nominated Court's Chief Justice by President George Washington and English theologian Thomas Cushing (1512–1588). Direct descendant of John Cotton (1585–1652), the great 16th century Puritan theologian
- Richard Henry Dana Jr. (1815–1882), lawyer and politician who gained renown as the author of the classic American memoir Two Years Before the Mast. Both as a writer and as a lawyer, he was a champion of the downtrodden, from seamen to fugitive slaves and freedmen. Descendant of Founding Father Francis Dana (1743–1811), and of French Huguenot Richard Dana (1620–1690) who arrived in Massachusetts during the later end of the Puritan migration to New England.
- Robert Williams Daniel, Jr. (1936–2012), member of the U.S. House of Representatives. Son of financier Robert Williams Daniel, descendant of William Randolph (prominent figure in the history and government of the English colony of Virginia) and Edmund Randolph (the seventh Governor of Virginia, the first attorney general of the United States and later served as secretary of state).
- Michel David-Weill, French investment banker and former chairman of Lazard Frères, art collector. Great-great-grandson of Alexandre Weill, co-founder of Lazard Frères
- Henry A. Dudley (1913–1995), U.S. Ambassador. Member of the ancient prominent Dudley family, whose members include Lord Henry Dudley (1517–1568), Thomas Dudley (1576–1653) Founder and Governor of the Massachusetts Bay Colony and a founder of Harvard University, and Joseph Dudley (1647–1720) Colonial Administrator of the Dominion of New England
- Angier Biddle Duke (1915–1995), youngest American Ambassador in history and Chief of Protocol of the United States. Heir of the Duke Family business empire in tobacco and electric power, and major benefactor of Duke University, named after his family (one of the First Families of Virginia). Also a scion of the prominent Biddle family, and a great-great-grandson of financier Anthony Joseph Drexel who founded with J. P. Morgan the bank Drexel, Morgan & Co. (later J.P. Morgan & Co.)
- David Eccles, 1st Viscount Eccles (1904–1999), member of the House of Lords and prominent British politician who served as Minister of Education, Minister of Works, and as President of the Board of Trade
- T. S. Eliot (1888–1965), Nobel Prize-winning poet, playwright, and literary critic. Member of the aristocratic Boston Brahmin Eliot family, whose notable members include Charles William Eliot (1834–1926) the longest serving President of Harvard University, and Charles Eliot Norton (1827–1908) progressive social considered the most cultivated man in the United States by his contemporaries
- William Crowninshield Endicott (1826–1900), United States Secretary of War. Member of the prominent Endicott family, and direct descendant of John Endecott (1589–1665), one of the Fathers of New England and the longest-serving governor of the Massachusetts Bay Colony
- Marquis Ruggero Farace di Villaforesta (1909–1970), Italian Ambassador, and member of the highly aristocratic family Farace di Villaforesta, whose origins have been documented back to the aristocratic families of the Byzantine Empire, and which is directly related to figures such as Queen Natialia of Serbia or Princess Aspasia of Greece and Denmark. He was married to Princess Catherine Ivanovna of Russia, great-great-granddaughter of Tsar Nicholas I of Russia, a niece of King Alexander I of Yugoslavia, and second cousin of Prince Philip, Duke of Edinburgh
- Baron Carlo de Ferrariis Salzano (1905–1985), Italian Ambassador. Scion the Princely House of Gaetani dell'Aquila d'Aragona from his mother side and of the Princely House of Morra from his paternal grandmother
- Frederick Theodore Frelinghuysen (1817–1885), Secretary of State. Grandson of Continental Army General Frederick Frelinghuysen (general) (1753–1804) and great-great-grandson of Dutch Reformed Church minister Theodorus Jacobus Frelinghuysen (1691–1747). Member of the Frelinghuysen political dynasty
- Francis Warrington Gillet (1895–1969) was an American flying ace who served in both the American and British armed forces as a pilot during World War I. Member of the prominent Gillett family whose members include colonist Jonathan Gillett (1609–1677) and Speaker of the United States House of Representatives Frederick H. Gillett (1851–1935)
- Ogden Goelet (1851–1897), yachtsman and heir to one of America's largest business empires at the time. Member of the prominent Goelet family, descendants of an aristocratic family of Huguenots in France who escaped from religious persecutions and arrived in New York in 1676. His daughter, Mary Goelet, married Henry Innes-Ker, 8th Duke of Roxburghe
- Baron Amaury de La Grange (1888–1953), aviator and politician
- Baron Frederick G. d'Hauteville (1838–1918), politician, member of the House of Hauteville
- Baron Paul G. d'Hauteville (1875–1947), Captain of the Red Cross, member of the House of Hauteville
- Count Florian Henckel von Donnersmarck, German film director, best known for writing and directing the 2006 Oscar-winning dramatic thriller The Lives of Others
- His Imperial Highness Prince Friedrich of Hohenzollern (1924–2010), head of the Imperial House of Hohenzollern for over 45 years, and scion on his mother side of the Royal House of Wettin and through his paternal grandmother of the Royal House of Bourbon-Two Sicilies
- Baron Rodolphe Hottinger, banker and member of the House of Hottinger
- Peter Augustus Jay (1877–1933), Ambassador. Great-great-great-grandson of John Jay (1745–1829), Founding Father and first United States Chief Justice. Member of the Jay family of Huguenots who had come to New York to escape religious persecution in France
- Woodbury Kane (1859–1905), a noted yachtsman and bon vivant, and member of Theodore Roosevelt's Rough Riders. Great-great-grandson of John Jacob Astor
- John Knowles (1926–2001), American novelist best known for A Separate Peace. Scion of the prominent Knowles family and direct descendant of Royal Navy Admiral Sir Charles Knowles (1754–1831)
- Amos A. Lawrence (1814–1886), key figure in the United States abolitionist movement in the years leading up to the American Civil War. Son of philanthropist Amos Lawrence (1786–1852) and scion of the Lawrence family who descend from John Lawrence (1609–1667) of England
- Robert J. Livingston (1811–1891), businessman, member of the prominent Livingston family, which descends from the 4th Lord Livingston (died 1518), and whose members include Robert Livingston the Elder (1654–1728) and signers of the United States Declaration of Independence (Philip Livingston) and the United States Constitution (William Livingston). Several members were Lords of Livingston Manor.
- His Serene Highness Prince Edouard de Lobkowicz (1926–2010), Austrian-American Ambassador and investment banker. Member of the Princely House of Lobkowicz and member of the Royal House of Bourbon-Parma
- Henry Cabot Lodge Jr. (1902–1985), United States Ambassador and prominent American politician. Scion of the patrician Lodge family, he is the grandson of Senate Majority Leader Senator Henry Cabot Lodge (1850–1924), the great-grandson of Secretary of State Frederick Theodore Frelinghuysen (1817–1885), and great-great-great-grandson of Senator George Cabot (1751–1823)
- Joseph Florimond, Duke of Loubat (1831–1927), yachtsman, bibliophile, antiquarian, and philanthropist
- A. Lawrence Lowell (1856–1943), President of Harvard University. Scion of the Patrician Lowell family, whose notable members include Percival Lowell (1571–1665), minister John Lowell (1704–1767), delegate to the Congress of the Confederation John Lowell (1743–1802), Ambassador and poet James Russell Lowell (1819–1891), and mathematician and astronomer Percival Lowell (1855–1916) who led the discovery of Pluto
- Anthony Dryden Marshall (1924–2014), theatrical producer, C.I.A. intelligence officer former ambassador. Great-great-grandson of John Fairfield Dryden (1839–1911), founder of Prudential Insurance Company and a United States senator from 1902 to 1907.
- Frederick Townsend Martin (1849–1914), writer and anti-poverty advocate, referred to as the "millionaire with a mission."
- Paul Mellon (1907–1999), philanthropist and an owner/breeder of thoroughbred racehorses. Co-heir to one of America's greatest business fortunes; member of the prominent Mellon family
- Baron Jean de Ménil (1904–1973), Franco-American businessman, philanthropy, and art patron
- George Minot (1885–1950), winner of the Nobel Prize in Medicine. Great-great-grandson of historian George Richards Minot (1758–1802), and cousin of Charles Sedgwick Minot (1852–1914) anatomist and a founding member of the American Society for Psychical Research. Scion of the Boston Brahmin Minot family
- Count Gebhardt von Moltke (1938–2019), Ambassador, and direct descendant of Prussian field marshal Count Helmuth von Moltke, and great-great-grandnephew of Chief of the Great German General Staff Count Helmuth von Moltke
- Antoine-Amédée-Marie-Vincent Manca Amat de Vallombrosa, Marquis de Morès et de Montemaggiore (1858–1896), famous duelist, railroad pioneer in Vietnam, and a politician in his native country France
- J. P. Morgan (1837–1913). banker and financier, descendant of William Morgan (1582–1649) and Miles Morgan (1616–1699). Member of the prominent Morgan family. Resigned when a friend he had sponsored for membership was blackballed and founded the Metropolitan Club of New York
- Marquis Guy-Philippe de Montebello, director of the Metropolitan Museum of Art
- Edward N. Ney (1925–2014), Ambassador. Descendant of Michel Ney, Marshal of the Empire during the Napoleonic Wars
- Kichisaburo Nomura (1877–1964), Japanese ambassador
- Count Jehan de Noüe (1907–1999), Chief of Protocol of the United Nations. Member of the ancient aristocratic de Noüe family
- John Bertram Oakes (1913–2001), iconoclastic and influential U.S. journalist known for his early commitment to the environment, civil rights, and opposition to the Vietnam War. Great-great-great-grandson of General Sir Hildebrand Oakes (1754–1822)
- Baron Max von Oppenheim (1860–1946), archaeologist, famous for discovering the site of Tell Halaf in 1899. Member of the prominent Oppenheim family
- Charles Jackson Paine (1833–1916) railroad executive, yachtsman, and a general in the Union Army during the American Civil War. Great-great-grandson of Robert Treat Paine (1731–1814) Founding Father of the United States who signed the Continental Association and the Declaration of Independence
- The Lord Palumbo, property developer and art collector, member of the House of Lords
- Marquis Lelio Pellegrini Quarantotti (1909–1990), Italian Grand Prix motor racing driver
- Johnston Livingston de Peyster (1846–1903), colonel during the civil war, and known for running for mayor of Tivoli-on-Hudson against his father, and winning. Member of the prominent De Peyster family and Livingston family. Great-great-great-grandson of Abraham de Peyster (1657–1728), an early Mayor of New York City, whose father was Johannes de Peyster (c. 1600–1685). Descendant of William Livingston, 4th Lord Livingston (died 1518)
- Wendell Phillips (1811–1884) was an American abolitionist, advocate for Native Americans, orator, and attorney. According to George Lewis Ruffin, a Black attorney, Phillips was seen by many Blacks as "the one white American wholly color-blind and free from race prejudice." Son of John Phillips (1770–1823), first mayor of Boston, and descendant of English-born Puritan minister George Phillips (1593–1644). Scion of the Boston Brahmin Phillips family, which counts among its notable members Samuel Phillips, Jr. (1752–1802), and John Phillips (1719–1795), founders of the Phillips Academy and Phillips Exeter Academy
- Henry Hepburne-Scott, 10th Lord Polwarth (1916–2005), businessman, Minister of State of Scotland
- George P. Putnam (1887–1950), American publisher, author and explorer. Husband of Amelia Earhart the first female aviator to fly solo across the Atlantic Ocean. Grandson of George Palmer Putnam (1814–1872), founder of the prominent publishing firm that became G. P. Putnam's Sons. Descendant of army general Israel Putnam (1718–1790) and English Puritan John Putnam (1580–1666)
- Edmund Quincy (1808–1877), abolitionist and editor of National Anti-Slavery Standard. Grandson of President of Harvard University Josiah Quincy III (1772–1864) and scion of the prominent Quincy family
- His Serene Highness Prince Dominik Radziwiłł (1911–1976), head of the House of Radziwiłł
- His Serene Highness Prince Anthony Radziwill (1959–1999), member of the House of Radziwiłł and nephew of First Lady Jacqueline Kennedy Onassis (wife of President John F. Kennedy).
- Laurance Rockefeller (1910–2004), financier, philanthropist and major conservationist. Grandson of John D. Rockefeller, considered to be the richest person in modern history. Member of the Rockefeller family
- David Rockefeller (1915–2017), banker, chairman and chief executive of Chase Manhattan Corporation. Grandson of John D. Rockefeller, considered to be one of the richest people in modern history. Member of the Rockefeller family
- His Imperial Highness Prince Alexander Romanov (1929–2002), member of the Imperial House of Romanov
- Theodore Roosevelt Sr. (1831–1878), father of President of the United States, member of the patrician Roosevelt family He was Secretary of the Union League Club and a founding member of the Knickerbocker Club in 1871.
- Franklin D. Roosevelt (1882–1945), President of the United States, member of the patrician Roosevelt family—joined in 1903 upon his graduation from Harvard University. Resigned from the club in 1936.
- Viscount Paul de Rosière (1908–1995), Cartier's Chief Executive.
- Count Teofilo Guiscardo Rossi di Montelera (1902–1991), Italian bobsledder who competed in the early 1930s, and a world champion power boat racer, winning world championship in 1934, 1937, 1938, and was set to defend the Gold Cup in 1939 when war broke out. He was the heir of the aristocratic family Rossi di Montelera
- Baron Guy de Rothschild (1909–2007), owner of the Rothschild banking family of France and head of the French branch of the House of Rothschild
- Leverett Saltonstall (1892–1979), Senate Majority Leader and Minority Leader and Chair of the Senate Republican Conference. Direct descendant of Sir Richard Saltonstall (1586–1661), and member of the prominent Saltonstall family
- John Singer Sargent (1856–1925), artist, considered the leading impressionist portrait painter of his generation. Direct descendant of Epes Sargent (1690–1762), and scion of the patrician Sargent family, whose notable members include Winthrop Sargent (1753–1820), Henry Sargent (1770–1845), or Charles Sprague Sargent (1841–1927)
- His Imperial Highness Zera Yacob Amha Selassie, grandson of Emperor Haile Selassie and son of Amha Selassie of the Ethiopian Empire. Current head of the Imperial House of Ethiopia
- Baron Ottavio Serena di Lapigio (1837–1914), Senator of the Kingdom of Italy, historian, and prominent figure in the Unification of Italy
- William Watts Sherman (1842–1912), businessman, member of the patrician Sherman family
- Viscomte Henri de Sibour (1872–1938), architect
- Count Alexander von Stauffenberg (1905–1964), German aristocrat and historian. His twin brother Berthold Schenk Graf von Stauffenberg and younger brother Claus Schenk Graf von Stauffenberg were among the leaders of the 20 July plot against Hitler in 1944. Member of the Schenk von Stauffenberg family which included prominent figures such as Prussian Field marshal Count August Neidhardt von Gneisenau
- Augustus Van Horne Stuyvesant Jr. (1870–1953) New York landowner and last direct descendent of Peter Stuyvesant (1592–1672), the Dutch governor of New Netherland before it became New York. Scion of the prominent Stuyvesant family
- Baron David Swaythling (1928–1998), Member of the House of Lords and chairman of many notable British companies, such as Rothschild & Co, Samuel Montagu & Co. or Midland Bank
- Nathaniel Thayer III (1851–1911), American banker and railroad executive. Scion of the Boston Brahmin Thayer family, and through his mother a descendant of the Dutch Aristocratic Van Rensselaer and Schuyler families
- Marquis Filippo Theodoli, Duke of Nemi (1930–1990), owner of the first high-performance luxury yachts company Magnum Marine Corporation
- Baron Hans Heinrich Thyssen-Bornemisza (1921–2002), noted industrialist and art collector
- Count Antoine Treuille de Beaulieu (1804–1885), Army General, known for developing the concept of rifled guns in the French Army.
- Baron Léon van der Elst (1856–1933), Belgian Ambassador and one of King Albert I of Belgium's closest advisers
- Baron Georg von Ullmann (1922–1972), owner of the German Thoroughbred stud Gestüt Schlenderhan that has had a major impact on the breeding history of Thoroughbreds. Scion of the prominent Oppenheim family
- Count Mario di Valmarana (1929–2010), architect, owner of the Palladian Villa "La Rotonda"
- Pierre Van Cortlandt III (1815–1884), New York landowner. Scion of the prominent Van Cortlandt political dynasty whose members include Pierre Van Cortlandt (1721–1814), the first lieutenant governor of New York, and Philip Van Cortlandt (1749–1831), a founder of the hereditary Society of the Cincinnati
- Cornelius Vanderbilt III (1873–1942), general. Member of the prominent Vanderbilt family. Great-great-grandson of the railroad and shipping tycoon Cornelius Vanderbilt ("The Commodore"), one of the richest Americans in history. Descendant of the famous Dutch corsair Jan Janszoon (1570–1641)
- Harold Stirling Vanderbilt (1884–1970), railroad executive, yachtsman, bridge player, and a member of the prominent Vanderbilt family. Great-great-grandson of the railroad and shipping tycoon Cornelius Vanderbilt ("The Commodore"), one of the richest American in history. Descendant of the famous Dutch corsair Jan Janszoon (1570–1641)
- Alexander Van Rensselaer (1850–1933), philanthropist, and professional tennis player and champion. Member of the prominent Van Rensselaer of Dutch Aristocratic origins, whose members include Kiliaen van Rensselaer (1586–1643) one of the founders and directors of the Dutch West India Company and an instrumental figure in the establishment of New Netherland; and Stephen Van Rensselaer III (1764–1839), Governor of New York and Grand Master of the Masonic Grand Lodge of New York and one of the richest people in history (net worth of US$3.1 billion at the time of his death—equivalent to $112.5 billion in 2021)
- Count Leonardo Vitetti (1894–1973), Permanent Representative of Italy to the United Nations
- Baron Egon von Vietinghoff-Scheel (1903–1994), German-Swiss painter, author, philosopher and creator of the Egon von Vietinghoff Foundation. He reconstructed the lost painting techniques of the Old Masters, and created some 2.700 paintings
- Craig Wadsworth (1872–1960), diplomat, steeplechase rider, and member of Theodore Roosevelt's Rough Riders. Grandson of Union general James S. Wadsworth. Scion of the prominent Wadsworth family of Connecticut, and descendant of one of the Founders of Hartford, Connecticut, William Wadsworth (1594–1675)
- James Montaudevert Waterbury Sr. (1851–1931), businessman, industrialist. Member of the prominent Livingston family, which includes the 4th Lord Livingston, and signers of the United States Declaration of Independence (Philip Livingston) and the United States Constitution (William Livingston)
- Baron Béla Ferenc Xavér Wenckheim (1811–1879), Prime Minister of Hungary
- Henry White (1850–1927), U.S. ambassador, and one of the signers of the Treaty of Versailles.
- Robert Winthrop (1833–1892), banker, direct descendant of colonial governors John Winthrop (1587–1649), John Winthrop Jr. (1606–1676), and Fitz-John Winthrop (1637–1707).
- James T. Woodward (1837–1910), banker, avid hunter and horseman. Member of the prominent Woodward family
- Jerauld Wright (1898–1995), Commander-in-Chief of the U.S. Atlantic Command (CINCLANT) and the Commander-in-Chief of the U.S. Atlantic Fleet (CINCLANTFLT), and became the second Supreme Allied Commander Atlantic (SACLANT) for the North Atlantic Treaty Organization (NATO), from April 1, 1954, to March 1, 1960, serving longer in these three positions than anyone else in history. Son of General William M. Wright. Descendant of Senator William Wright (1794–1866) and George Mason IV (1725–1792), a Founding Father of the United States

== Reciprocal clubs ==
The Knickerbocker Club has mutual arrangements with the following clubs:

- Jockey Club in Paris
- Circolo della Caccia in Rome
- Cercle Royal du Parc in Brussels
- Metropolitan Club in Washington D.C.
- Boodle's in London
- Brooks's in London
- Nya Sällskapet in Stockholm
- Jockey Club für Österreich in Vienna
- Turf Club in Lisbon
- New Club in Edinburgh
- Nuevo Club in Madrid
- Haagsche Club in The Hague
- Norske Selskab in Oslo
- Nouveau Cercle de l'Union in Paris
- Círculo de Armas in Buenos Aires
- Australian Club in Sydney
- Kildare Street & University Club in Dublin
- Società del Whist – Accademia Filarmonica in Turin
- Somerset Club in Boston
- York Club in Toronto

== See also ==
- List of gentlemen's clubs in the United States
- List of New York City Designated Landmarks in Manhattan from 59th to 110th Streets
