= Melitta Schenk Gräfin von Stauffenberg =

German aviator and test pilot

Flugkapitän Melitta Schenk Gräfin von Stauffenberg
- Born: Melitta Schiller; 3 January 1903; Krotoschin, Prussia, Germany (present-day Krotoszyn, Poland)
- Died: 8 April 1945 (aged 42); Straubing, Nazi Germany
- Occupations: Test pilot; engineer
- Spouse(s): Alexander Schenk Graf von Stauffenberg (1937–1945, her death)
- Parent(s): Michael Schiller, Margaret née Eberstein

Melitta Schenk Gräfin von Stauffenberg (née Schiller; 3 January 1903 – 8 April 1945) was a German aviator who served as a test pilot in the Luftwaffe before and during World War II.

She was the second German woman to be awarded the honorary title of Flugkapitän (English: flight captain) and also flew over 2,500 test flights in dive bombers, the second most of any Luftwaffe test pilot. Von Stauffenberg was awarded the Iron Cross Second Class and the Gold Front Flying Clasp for Bombers with diamonds, for performing over 1,500 test flights in dive bomber aircraft.

In 1944 she was arrested with other Stauffenberg family members on suspicion of conspiring with her brothers-in-law to assassinate Adolf Hitler, but she was later released to continue her test-flight duties.

Countess von Stauffenberg died after being shot down by an American reconnaissance plane on 8 April 1945.

== Early life and education ==
Melitta Schiller was born in Krotoschin, Prussia. Her father was Michael Schiller, a Jewish man who converted to Christianity at the age of 18. Her mother was Margaret Eberstein. She had four siblings: Marie-Luise, Otto, Jutta and Klara.

With the end of World War I Krotoschin became part of Poland. In October 1919 Schiller began attending boarding school across the border in Hirschberg, Silesia.

Schiller passed the diploma for university entrance in 1922 and accepted a place at the Technical University of Munich. There she studied mathematics, physics and engineering, eventually specialising in aeronautical engineering. In 1927 she graduated cum laude.

== Aviation experience ==
Schiller started working for the Deutsche Versuchsanstalt für Luftfahrt (DVL), an experimental institute for aviation, in Berlin-Adlershof in 1927. In July 1929 she began flying lessons at Staaken and obtained her provisional flying license within a few months and her full license by mid-1930.

In 1936 she was forced from her job as Ingenieurflugzeugführerin (aeronautical engineer) because of her father's Jewish origins, despite her father having converted to Christianity at the age of 18.

On 11 August 1937 at Berlin-Wilmersdorf, Schiller married the historian Alexander Schenk Graf von Stauffenberg, and on 28 October 1937, she was given the honorary rank of Flugkapitänin, or "flight captain", a rank reserved for test pilots in Germany at the time, and became only the second woman in Germany, after Hanna Reitsch, to achieve this. She eventually gained licences for all classes of powered aircraft, the aerobatic flying licence, and the glider licence.

== World War II ==
At the beginning of World War II, Stauffenberg wanted to work for the Red Cross but was ordered to become a test pilot for the Luftwaffe at the central Erprobungsstelle test facility in Rechlin, Mecklenburg. Still a civilian, she was officially seconded from Askania in Berlin. She did test dives in warplanes, up to 15 times a day, from a height of 4,000 metres.

From 1942, Stauffenberg continued her test-flights at the Luftwaffe's technical academy in Berlin-Gatow. She was awarded the Iron Cross 2nd Class on 22 January 1943; the medal was pinned on her by the chief of the Oberkommando der Luftwaffe himself, Hermann Göring on the 29th. She made her dissertation for her Masters qualification in 1944, and received an A grade. She then became technical chief of the Versuchsstelle für Flugsondergeräte, another test institute, in the same year.

When the 20 July plot failed, she was arrested with the rest of the Stauffenberg family. Her two brothers-in-law, Claus and Berthold, were executed. She and her husband, as well as the other adult members of the family, were sent to concentration camps. However, she was released on 2 September because of the military importance of her work. As the name von Stauffenberg was anything but popular among the Nazis, she was now officially addressed as "Gräfin Schenk" instead of "Gräfin Schenk von Stauffenberg". Her sisters-in-law, one of them pregnant, were confined in concentration camps and the Stauffenberg children were taken away from their mothers. Stauffenberg used her prominent position to help as much as she could.

Stauffenberg felt loyal to Germany, but not to the Nazis. She therefore supported the Luftwaffe, but she confessed in her diaries that this moral conflict tormented her.

Stauffenberg maintained contact with the incarcerated members of her extended family, even though they were imprisoned in concentration camps. Her status, and the possibility that the prisoners might be useful in a bargain with the Western Allies when Germany finally fell, kept them moderately well looked after. She flew several times to Buchenwald concentration camp once she learned in March 1945 that her husband was there. As research facilities in Berlin were dispersed to other locations ahead of the Soviet advance, Stauffenberg's activities were moved to Wurzberg, where she found that a RAF raid had destroyed her house.

== Death ==
On 4 April, with her assistant pilot Hubertus, she set out for Buchenwald. Seeing from the air that the special prisoner compound was empty – the prisoners had been moved to Regensburg – she flew back to Weimar. They flew some personnel from Weimar in an overloaded Siebel Si 204 to Pilsen, where they exchanged the Siebel for a two-seater Bü 181 Bestmann trainer on 6 April. At Marienburg, Hubertus left her to fly on to Straubing and then Regensburg to look for her husband. By that point, her husband and other prisoners had been moved again; Stauffenberg got Gestapo authorisation to visit the commandant at Schönberg, where they had been taken.

She took off early on 8 April 1945, flying low to the ground along the line of the railway to navigate. An American F-6D reconnaissance airplane flown by First Lieutenant Norbourn Thomas, who was hunting Ju 87s, attacked her near Straßkirchen, Bavaria. She crash-landed the aircraft and was conscious when civilians arrived to help. She asked for assistance to get out of the aircraft, and was extracted from the aircraft alive. The civilians reported her most serious injury appeared to be a broken leg.

A local doctor, Hans Siegl from Straßkirchen, arrived at the scene, but as a Luftwaffe doctor and other military were on scene, his services were not needed; she was taken off in an ambulance. Von Stauffenberg's injuries did not appear life-threatening, but she died two hours later. Her remains were taken to the hospital in Straubing, where the town mortuary book noted as the cause of death "...skull base fracture, tearing of the left thigh, fracture of the right ankle." Her husband learned of her death a few days later.

She was buried on 13 April in St Michaels Cemetery, arranged by Staubing airbase commander's assistant. In September 1945 Alexander arranged to have her exhumed and transported to the Stauffenberg estate at Lautlingen where she was interred in the family crypt on 8 September 1945.

== Awards ==
- Iron Cross Second Class
- Gold Front Flying Clasp for Bombers with Diamonds

== Bibliography ==
- Bracke, Gerhard (2012). Melitta Gräfin Stauffenberg: Das Leben einer Fliegerin [Melitta Gräfin Stauffenberg: The life of an aviatrix] (in German). Herbig Verlag. ISBN 978-3-776-62707-7.
- Medicus, Thomas (2013). Melitta von Stauffenberg: Ein deutsches Leben [Melitta von Stauffenberg: A German life] (in German). Rowohlt Taschenbuch Verlag. ISBN 978-3-499-62562-6.
- Ernst Probst/Heiko Peter Melle: Sturzflüge für Deutschland: Kurzbiografie der Testpilotin Melitta Schenk Gräfin von Stauffenberg. Grin-Verlag, München 2012, ISBN 978-3-65625-609-0
- Mulley, Clare (2017). The Women Who Flew For Hitler. Macmillan. ISBN 978-1-4472-7420-9.
