= Philippe von Stauffenberg =

German businessman (born 1964)

- Born: 17 May 1964 (age 62)
- Education: BA (Harvard); MA (Harvard); MBA (Harvard Business School)
- Occupation: Businessman

Philippe Schenk Graf von Stauffenberg, also known as "PVS", (born 17 May 1964) is a German businessman, residing in London, United Kingdom. He is the CEO and founder of Greenback Recycling Technologies, a plastic recycling and certification company.

== Personal life ==
Born into an ancient House of Stauffenberg, Philipp Friedrich Maria was born in France as the son of Count Alfred Claus Maria Schenk von Stauffenberg (1937–1987) and his wife and relative, Baroness Marie Sophie Schenk von Stauffenberg (b. 1937). He was raised all over the world due to his parents being diplomats. He speaks German, English, Spanish and French fluently. He is married to Bettina Baatz and has four daughters, named Isabel, Olivia, Mafalda and Klara.

== Education ==
PVS holds a BA and MA in history from Harvard and earned an MBA from the Harvard Business School.

== Career ==
Von Stauffenberg started his career as a consultant at Bain & Company. In 2004, PVS founded Solidus Partners LLP, where he remains as the Managing Partner. The company is a private equity firm which invests in underperforming businesses and ‘buy and build’ situations in Europe, with a big focus on businesses that have the potential to become global market leaders. Before founding the company, Mr. von Stauffenberg worked for the European arm of Hicks, Muse, Tate & Furst (HMTF) now known as HM Capital Partners in London for 5 years where he sourced, made investments and later often assumed a role as operational manager in the portfolio companies. He gained his buy-and-build experience as an entrepreneur when he bought and ran the companies Heitman Documentation Services and Borg (1995–1998) for which he left Warburg Pincus (1992–1995).

=== Media ===
Between 2004 and 2008 PVS led two transactions in the media industry, investing in the German Klassik Radio franchise and developing the business to become the pre-eminent listed German Radio franchise. During 2005, Philippe also laid the foundations for the Mood Media transaction, where he led the financing and consolidation of the three European in-site media companies in a €130 m Buy& Build transaction. He served as Executive Chairman until July 2007. In 2010 PVS was instrumental in selling the company to Fluid Music, Canada, which then became Mood Media Corporation. PVS served both Klassik Radio and Mood Media Corporation as Vice Chairman. In September 2013, PVS became the Executive Chairman of Mood. At the end of 2014, PVS stepped down from this role and served as a director of the board until February 2016.

=== Green technologies ===
In 2010, Solidus Partners led the investor group that supported the management buy-out of Duales System Deutschland (Duales System Deutschland – Der Grüne Punkt). In February 2011, Mr von Stauffenberg became the Executive Chairman of the DSD board of directors. PVS resigned from the board in mid 2014.

From 2012 to 2018 he was also a director of the UK company Valpak Limited, a provider of environmental compliance and data management services in the UK and internationally.

In September 2018, Philippe created Greenback Recycling Technologies with a mission to fix a broken plastic recycling system. In March 2020, Greenback completed its first fundraising round. With the proceeds of this investment, Greenback acquired ecoVeritas, a UK specialist in data collection and analysis for Corporate Social Responsibility. Greenback also made an investment in Enval, a UK company that has developed a unique microwave-induced pyrolysis solution for recycling of low-density plastic packaging waste. In May 2023, Greenback opened its first advanced plastic recycling plant in Cuautla, Mexico.
