= John Lowell (minister) =

Clergyman and minister of Newburyport, Massachusetts

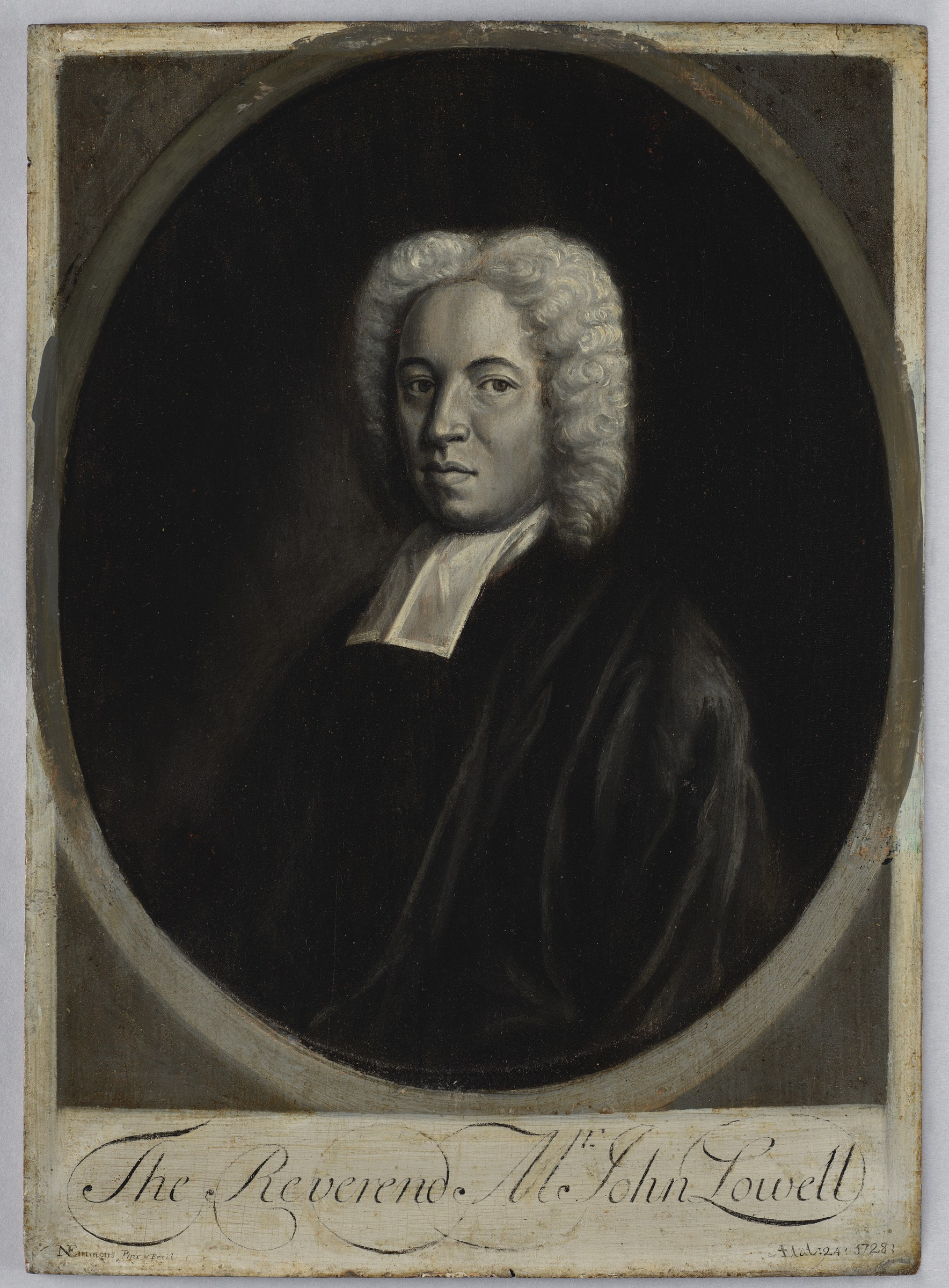
- Born: 1704
- Died: 1767
- Occupation: Minister
- Spouse: Sarah Champney
- Children: John Lowell
- Parents: Ebenezer Lowell (father); Elizabeth Shailer (mother)

Rev. John Lowell (born in Boston, Massachusetts on March 14, 1704; died in Newburyport, Massachusetts on May 17, 1767) was a colonial Massachusetts clergyman. He was the first minister in the history of Newburyport, Massachusetts and the father of John Lowell, the delegate to the Congress of the Confederation.

== Biography ==
John Lowell was the son of Ebenezer Lowell and Elizabeth Shailer. His great-grandfather, Percival Lowell (sometimes spelled Lowle), was the Lowell family immigrant ancestor. John Lowell was educated at Harvard University, graduating in 1721. He became the first minister of Newburyport, holding this position from 1726 to 1767.

Coat of Arms of John Lowell

== See also ==
- Lowell family
