= John Lowell =

American judge (1743–1802)

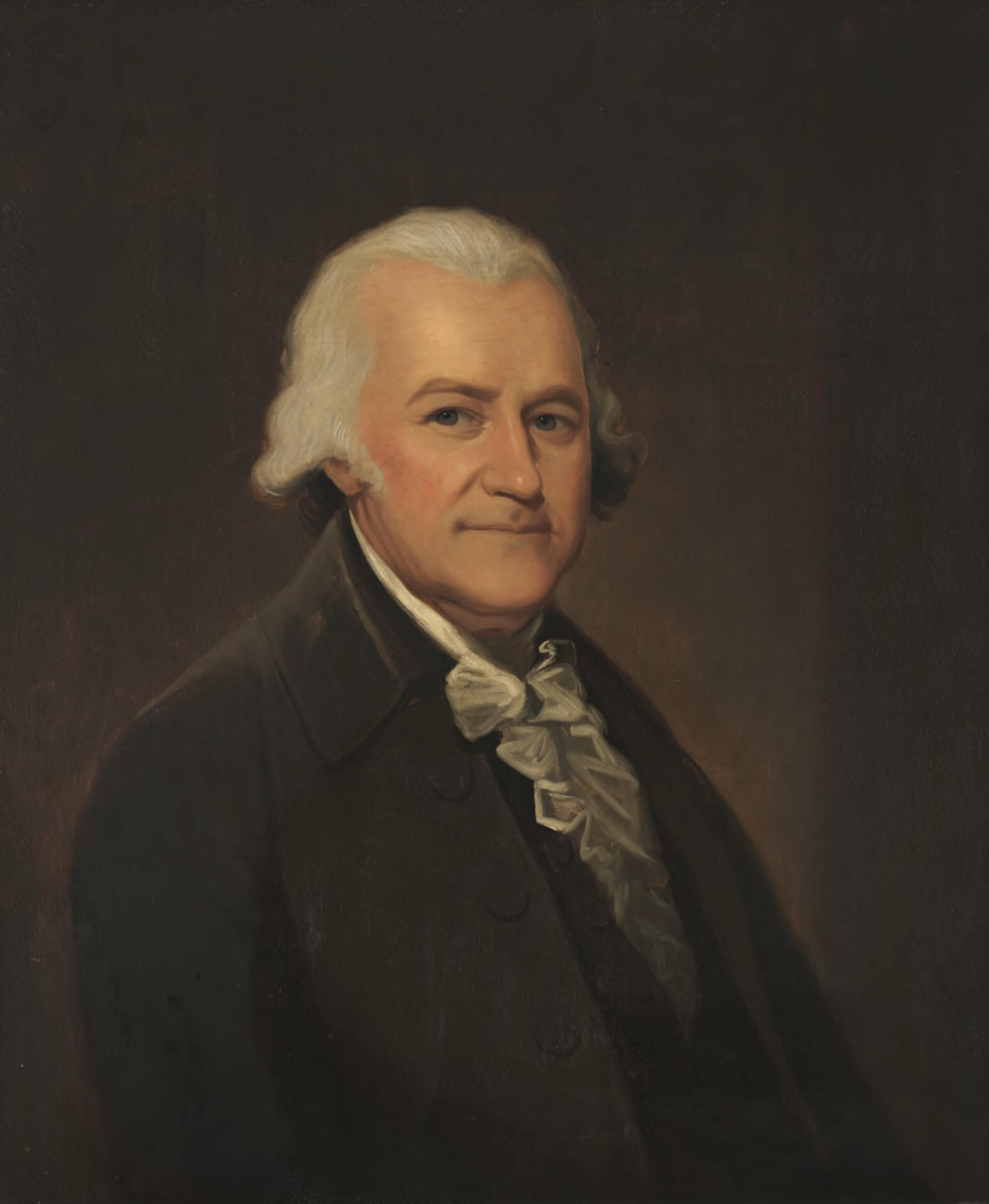

Chief Judge of the United States Circuit Court for the First Circuit
- In office February 20, 1801 – May 6, 1802
- Appointed by: John Adams
- Preceded by: Seat established by 2 Stat. 89
- Succeeded by: Seat abolished

Judge of the United States District Court for the District of Massachusetts
- In office September 26, 1789 – February 20, 1801
- Appointed by: George Washington
- Preceded by: Seat established by 1 Stat. 73
- Succeeded by: John Davis

Delegate from Massachusetts to the Congress of the Confederation
- In office 1782–1783
- Preceded by: James Lovell
- Succeeded by: Stephen Higginson

Personal details
- Born: June 17, 1743 Newburyport, Province of Massachusetts Bay, British America
- Died: May 6, 1802 (aged 58) Roxbury, Massachusetts, U.S.
- Spouses: Sarah Higginson (m. 1767; died 1772) Susanna Cabot (m. 1774; died 1777) Rebecca Russell (m. 1778)
- Children: 9, including John Jr., Francis, and Charles
- Parent: John Lowell (father)
- Relatives: Lowell family
- Education: Harvard University
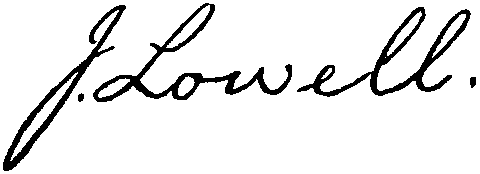
- Signature

John Lowell (June 17, 1743 – May 6, 1802) was a delegate to the Congress of the Confederation, a judge of the Court of Appeals in Cases of Capture under the Articles of Confederation, a United States district judge of the United States District Court for the District of Massachusetts and a United States circuit judge of the United States Circuit Court for the First Circuit.

== Early life ==
Born on June 17, 1743, in Newburyport, Province of Massachusetts Bay, British America, Lowell graduated from Harvard University in 1760 and read law in 1763.

== Career ==
He entered private practice in Newburyport from 1763 to 1771, 1773, and 1775. He was a selectman for Newburyport from 1771 to 1772, in 1774, and in 1776. In the spring of 1774, he signed addresses complimenting royal governors Thomas Hutchinson and Thomas Gage, but made a public apology for doing so at the end of the year. He served in the Massachusetts militia as a major in 1776 during the American Revolutionary War. He continued private practice in Boston, Massachusetts from 1777 to 1778, and from 1779 to 1781. After moving to Boston, Lowell became the leading attorney in Massachusetts representing privateer claims before the Admiralty Court, which formed the basis of his fortune. Of the 1100 privateering claims handled in Boston, Lowell was lead counsel in approximately 700, and assistant counsel in half the rest. He was a member of the Massachusetts House of Representatives in 1778, and from 1780 to 1782. He was a delegate to the Massachusetts constitutional convention in 1780. He was a delegate to the Congress of the Confederation (Continental Congress) from 1782 to 1783. He was a judge of the Court of Appeals in Cases of Capture under the Articles of Confederation starting in 1783. He was a member of a commission on the boundary between Massachusetts and New York in 1784. He was a member of the Massachusetts Senate from 1784 to 1785, and a U.S. Senate candidate in 1788. From his practice of the law and shipping ventures John was able to acquire a large estate and a considerable sum of money throughout his lifetime and despite not being from the richest family growing up he was able to raise the value of the Lowell name.

=== Influence on abolition of slavery in Massachusetts ===
As a member of the Massachusetts constitutional convention of 1780, Lowell is best remembered for authoring Article I and his insistence upon its adoption into the Bill of Rights, "All men are born free and equal, and have certain natural, essential and inalienable rights, among which may be reckoned the right of enjoying and defending their lives and liberties..."

Lowell's son, the Rev. Charles Lowell, D.D., wrote in a personal letter eight decades later, "My father introduced into the Bill of Rights the clause by which Slavery was abolished in Massachusetts... and when it was adopted, exclaimed: 'Now there is no longer Slavery in Massachusetts, it is abolished and I will render my services as a lawyer gratis to any slave suing for his freedom if it is withheld from him...' and he did so defend the negro slave against his master under this clause of the constitution which was declared valid by the Massachusetts Supreme Court in 1783, and since that time Slavery in Mass. has had no legal standing."

=== Highlights of his congressional service ===
During Lowell's service, the Congress of the Confederation met in the library of Nassau Hall at Princeton University and "congratulated George Washington on his successful termination of the war, received the news of the signing of the definitive treaty of peace with Great Britain, and welcomed the first foreign minister—from the Netherlands—accredited to the United States."

== Federal judicial service ==
Lowell was nominated by President George Washington on September 24, 1789, to the United States District Court for the District of Massachusetts, to a new seat authorized by 1 Stat. 73. He was confirmed by the United States Senate on September 26, 1789, and received his commission on September 26, 1789. His service terminated on February 20, 1801, due to his elevation to the First Circuit.

Lowell was nominated by President John Adams on February 18, 1801, to the United States Circuit Court for the First Circuit, to the new chief judge seat authorized by 2 Stat. 89. He was confirmed by the Senate on February 20, 1801, and received his commission the same day. His service terminated on May 6, 1802, due to his death in Roxbury, Massachusetts.

== Membership ==
In 1778, John Lowell became an original trustee of Phillips Academy. In 1780, Lowell became a charter member of the American Academy of Arts and Sciences. In 1787, he was elected to the American Philosophical Society.

== Personal life ==
Coat of Arms of John Lowell

Lowell's ancestor, Percival, a merchant, came from Bristol, England, to Newbury, province of Massachusetts Bay, in 1639, and his father, John, was the first minister of Newburyport, where he officiated from 1726 to 1767.

Lowell married his first wife, Sarah Higginson (January 14, 1745 – May 5, 1772), sister of Stephen Higginson, on January 8, 1767. They had three children, including John Lowell Jr. (1769–1840). John Lowell Jr.'s descendants include businessmen John Amory Lowell, Augustus Lowell, and Ralph Lowell; federal judges John Lowell and James Arnold Lowell; and siblings author and innovator Percival Lowell, Harvard President A. Lawrence Lowell, and poet Amy Lowell. Lowell's wife Sarah died on May 5, 1772.

Lowell married his second wife, Susanna Cabot (1754–1777), on May 31, 1774. Together they had two children, including Francis Cabot Lowell (1775–1817), a businessman and namesake of Lowell, Massachusetts. Descendants of Francis Cabot include businessman and philanthropist John Lowell Jr., federal judge Francis Cabot Lowell, and architect Guy Lowell. Susanna died on March 30, 1777.

On December 25, 1778, Lowell married his third wife, Rebecca Russell (1747–1816). They had four children, including Charles Russell Lowell Sr. (1782–1861). Charles Russell's son was the American poet James Russell Lowell; his grandsons included the American Civil War figure Charles Russell Lowell and Boston banker and family lawyer William Lowell Putnam. His great-great-grandson was the poet Robert Lowell.

Other notable children of the daughters and granddaughters of John Lowell include mathematician Julian Coolidge, and writer and biographer Ferris Greenslet.

== Publications ==
- Pietas et Gratulatio, a poem (1761)
- Oration on James Bowdoin the elder (delivered January 26, 1795), Memoirs of the American Academy of Arts and Sciences, v. 2 (prefix)

== See also ==
- Admiralty court
- List of delegates to the Continental Congress
- Continental Congress
- Boston Brahmin
- Nassau Hall
- Treaty of Paris (1783)

== Sources ==
- Chisholm, Hugh, ed. (1911). "Lowell, John" . Encyclopædia Britannica (11th ed.). Cambridge University Press.
- Rines, George Edwin, ed. (1920). "Lowell, John, American jurist" . Encyclopedia Americana.

Assembly seats
Preceded by James Lovell	Delegate from Massachusetts to the Congress of the Confederation; 1782–1783	Succeeded by Stephen Higginson
Legal offices
Preceded by Seat established by 1 Stat. 73	Judge of the United States District Court for the District of Massachusetts; 1789–1801	Succeeded by John Davis
Preceded by Seat established by 2 Stat. 89	Chief Judge of the United States Circuit Court for the First Circuit; 1801–1802	Succeeded by Seat abolished
