= Stauffenberg family =

German noble family

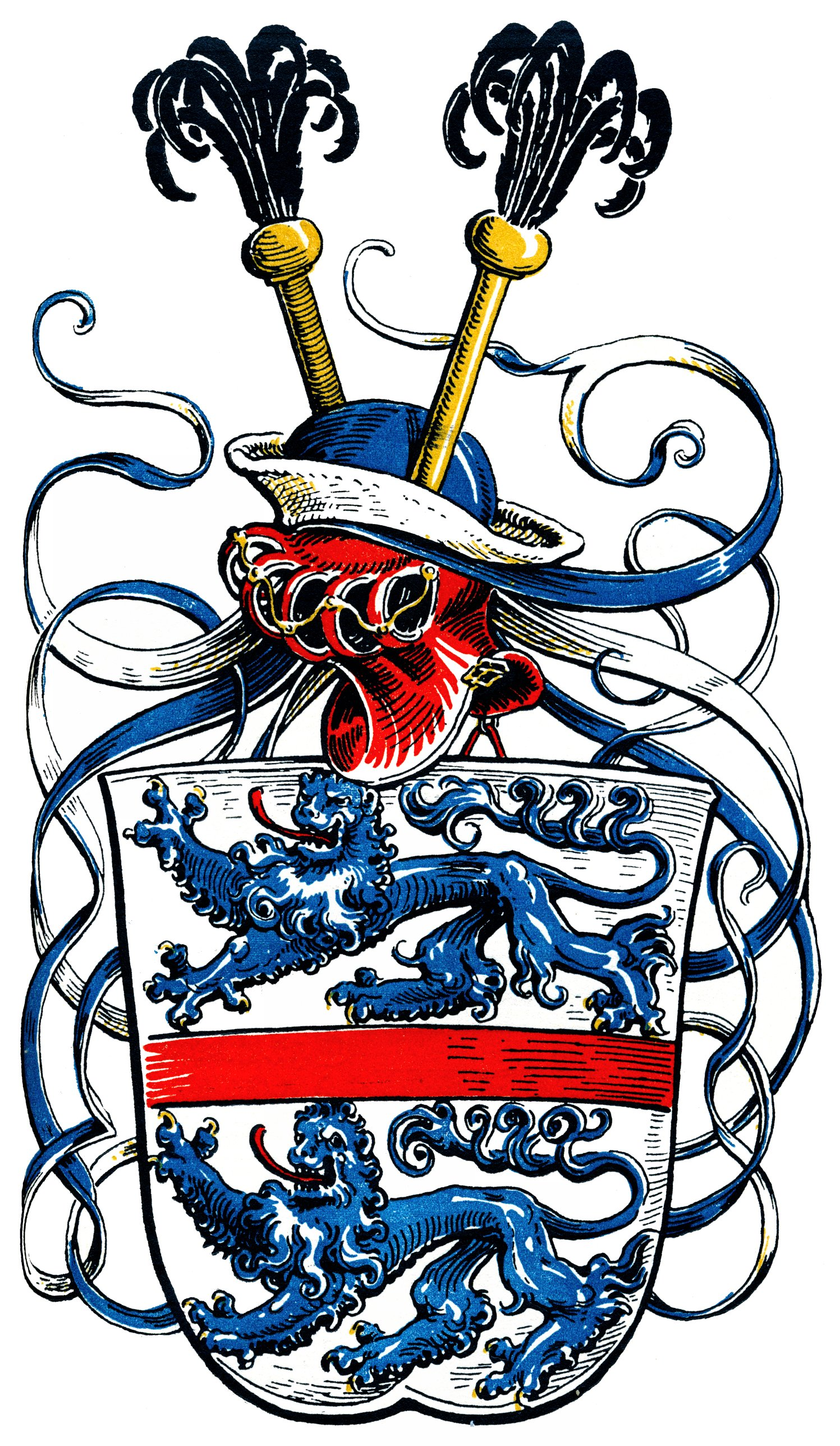
Coat of arms of the family

The Schenk von Stauffenberg family is a Roman Catholic Uradel German noble family from Swabia, Germany. The family's best-known recent member was Colonel Claus von Stauffenberg – the key figure in 20 July plot in 1944 to assassinate Adolf Hitler.

== History ==
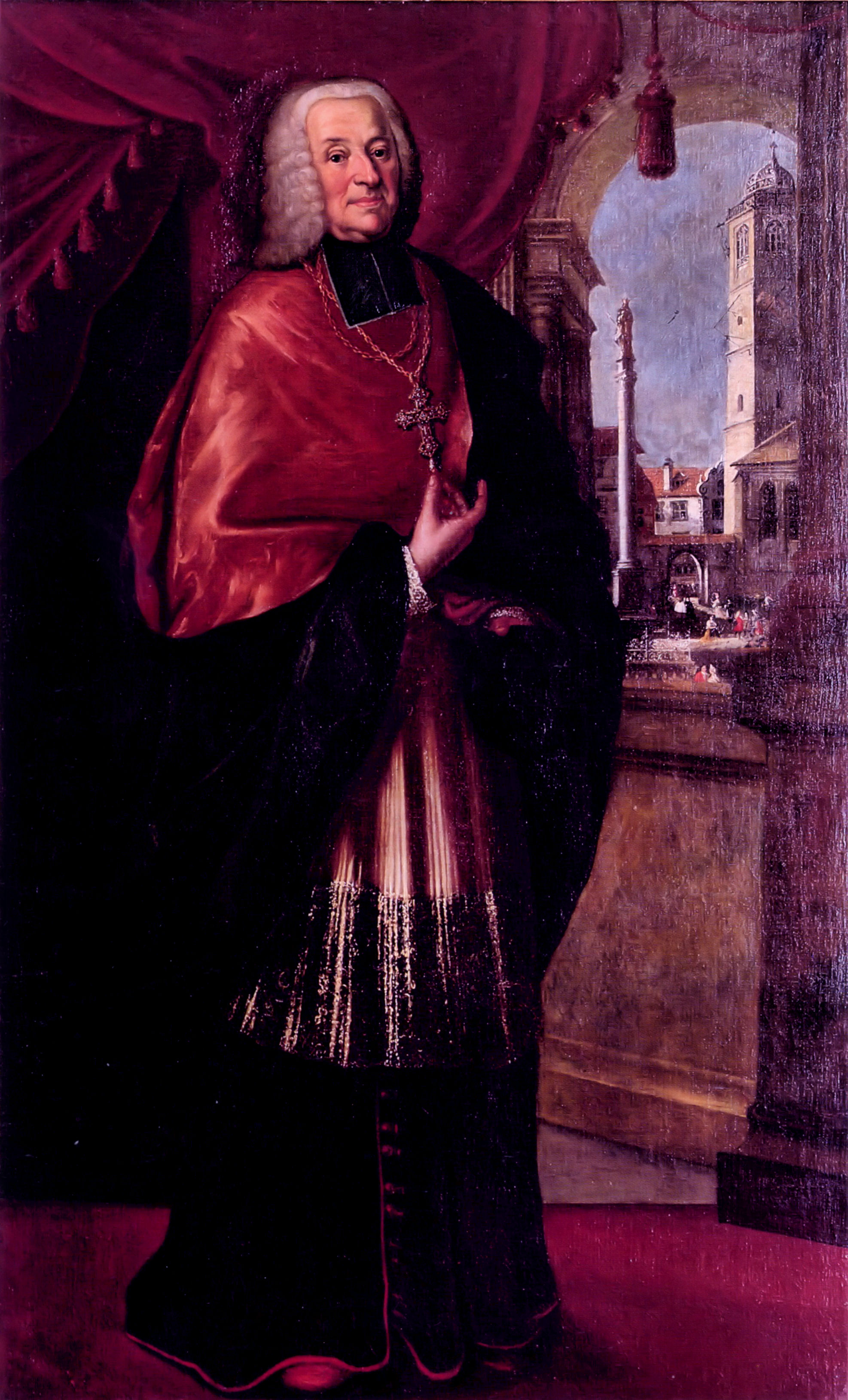
Johann Franz Schenk von Stauffenberg (1658–1740)

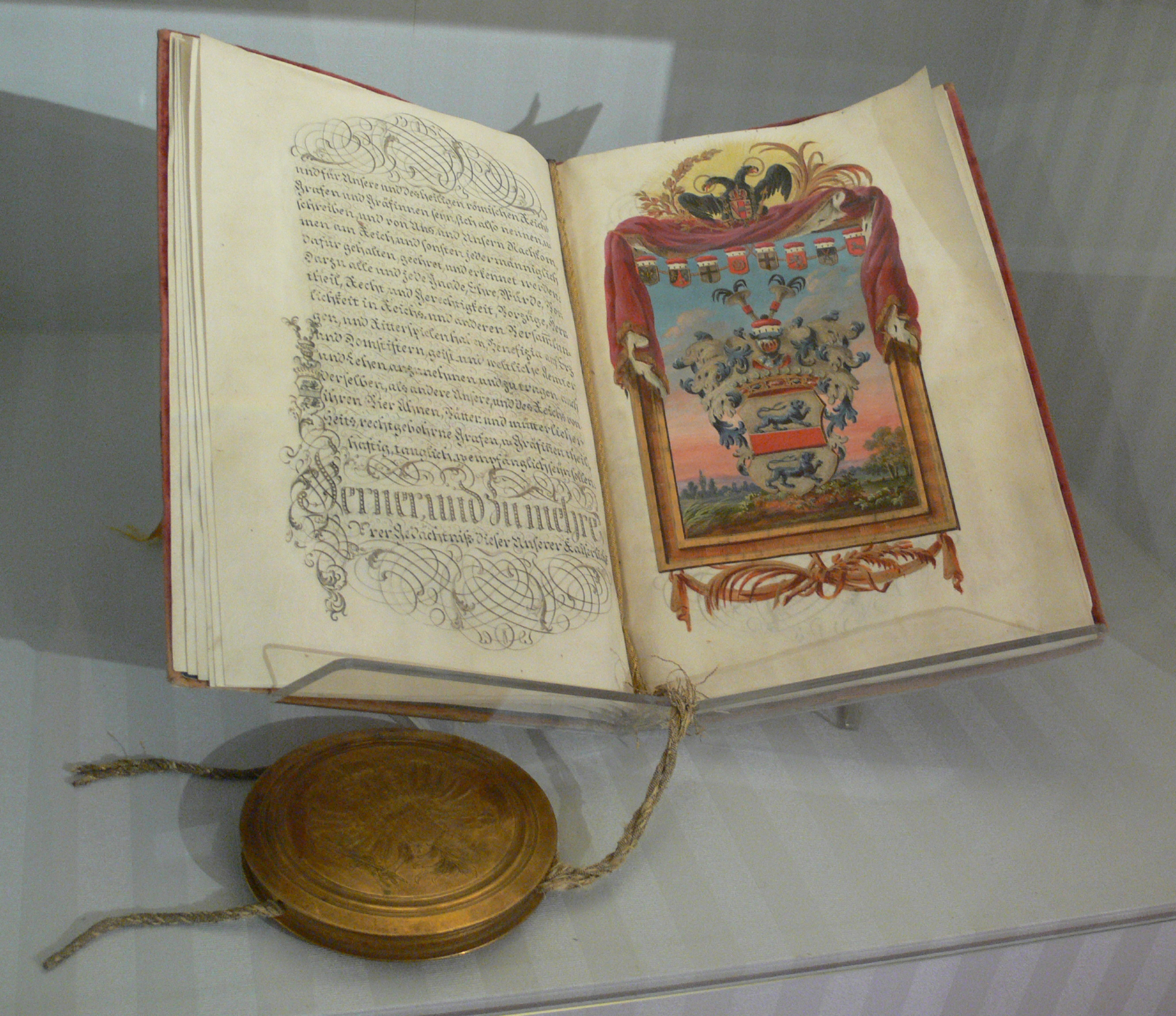
Patent awarding the title of Count to Anton Schenk von Stauffenberg by Emperor Joseph II, 1785

The recorded history of the Schenk von Stauffenberg family begins in Swabia in the 13th century, when the family, who belonged to the Reichsrittern (Imperial Knights), originated from the settlement Zell, where they owned extensive estates surrounding the village and the Zollernberg.

Its first known member is mentioned in 1251 as Werner Schenk von Zell (Wernherus Pincerna de Celle), who in 1255 was appointed to the ceremonial court office of Schenk (cup-bearer, sommelier, butler) with the Counts of Zollern. The officeholder was in charge of his lord's wine cellars and vineyards, and when the office of Schenk later became hereditary within the family, the title was adopted into the family name.

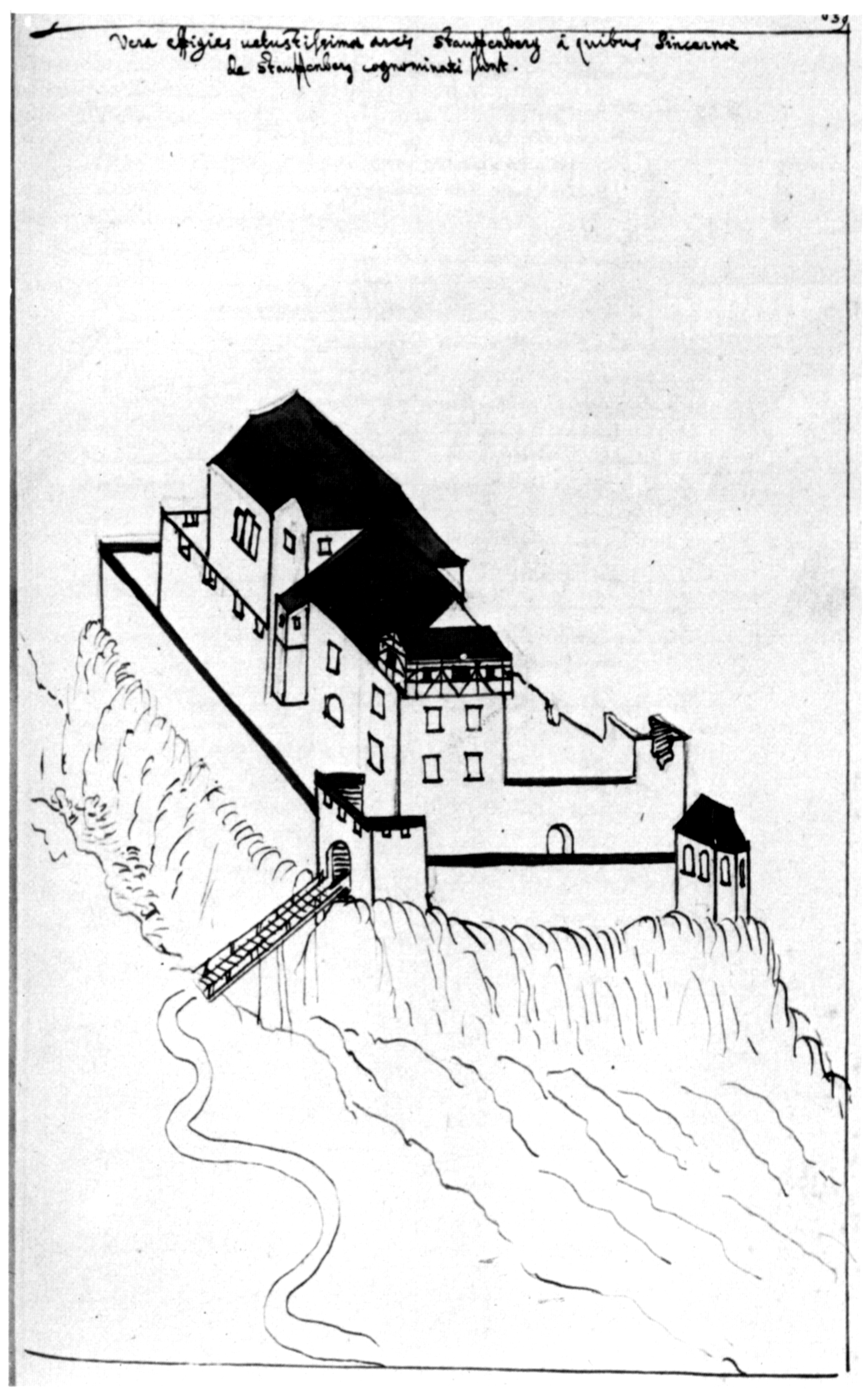
Burg Stauffenberg

Surnames were appended according to the officeholder's place of residence, and so the family name varied between Schenk von Zell, Schenk von Neuenzell, Schenk von Andeck, Schenk von Erpfingen and Schenk von Stauffenberg. By the end of the 15th century, the family's permanent name was Schenk von Stauffenberg, which refers to Stauffenberg Castle, a former castle situated by a small cone-shaped mountain of the same name between the small town of Hechingen and its suburb Rangendingen in Land Württemberg. A tradition in the family also associates it with the Staufen dynasty.

The Stauffenbergs rose in the world in 1698 when Emperor Leopold I conferred upon the brothers Maximilian Gottfried and Johann Philipp the hereditary title of Reichsfreiherr (Imperial Baron). The family was later split into four branches: the Katzensteiner, Bacher, Wilflinger and Amerdinger ones. The former two became extinct during the 18th century, while a member of the Wilflinger branch was raised to the rank of hereditary Reichsgraf (Imperial Count) by Emperor Leopold II in 1785. Since the Wilflinger branch also became extinct in 1833, only the baronial Amerdinger branch remained. All now living members of the family are descendants of the brothers Franz Ludwig and Friedrich of the Amerdinger branch. Franz Ludwig was made a hereditary Graf (Count) in the Kingdom of Bavaria by King Ludwig II. Since then, there exist two sub-branches: one which holds the title of Count and one which bears the title of Imperial Baron. Both of these branches are still extant and their members reside mostly in Baden-Württemberg and in Bavaria.

In the 16th century, the Stauffenberg family acquired the Amerdingen castle near Nördlingen through marriage. Before that, the Stauffenbergs were owners of Wilflingen and Jettingen. Over the course of the years, further estates and many Schlösser were added to the family's possessions, such as Schloss Greifenstein and Schloss Burggrub in Heiligenstadt near Bamberg, Schloss Lautlingen near Ebingen on the southern slopes of the Schwäbische Alb, Schloss Rißtissen some twenty kilometers south of Ulm, and the Straßberg and Wildentierberg estates in Lautlingen near Albstadt.

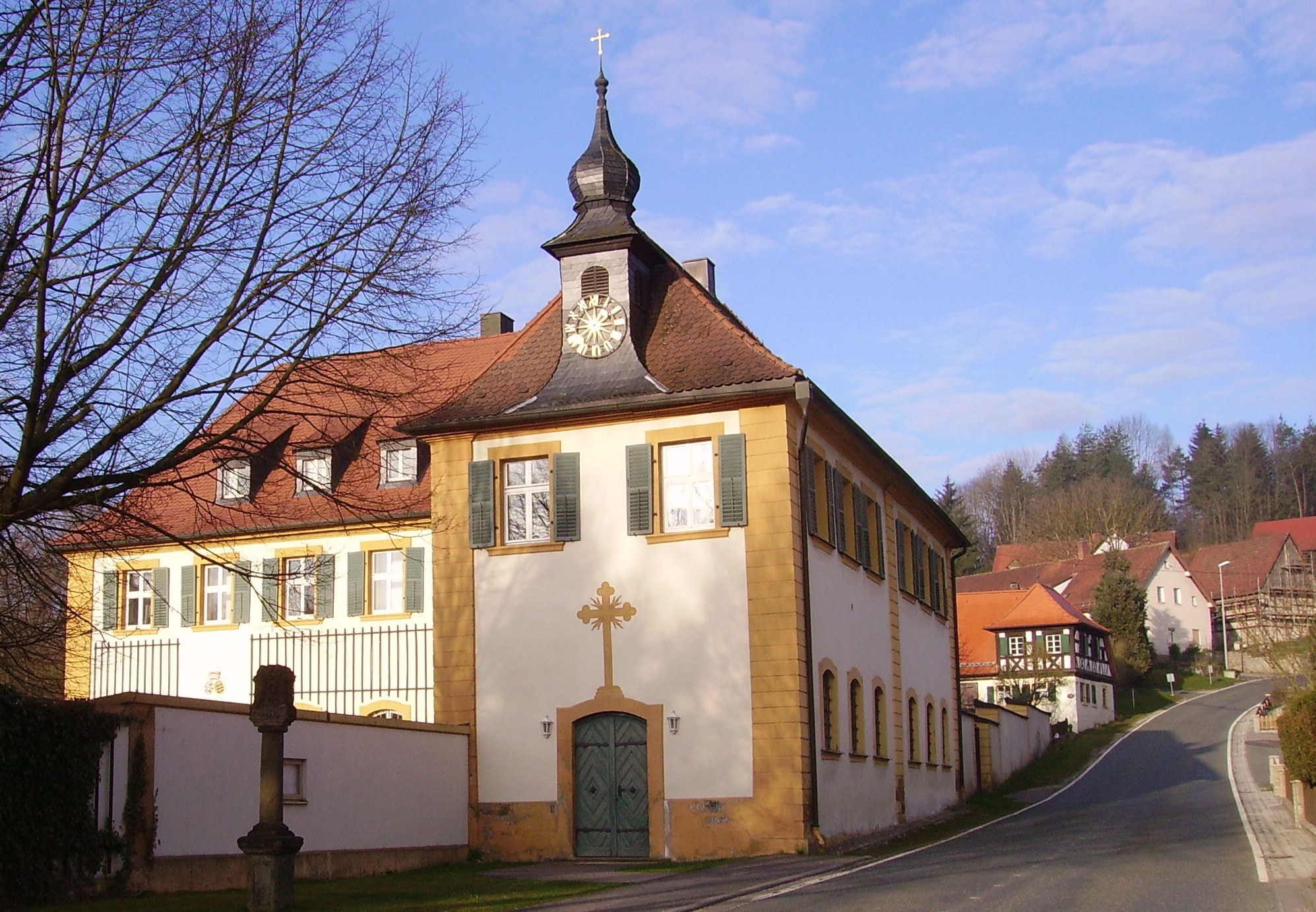
Schloss Burggrub

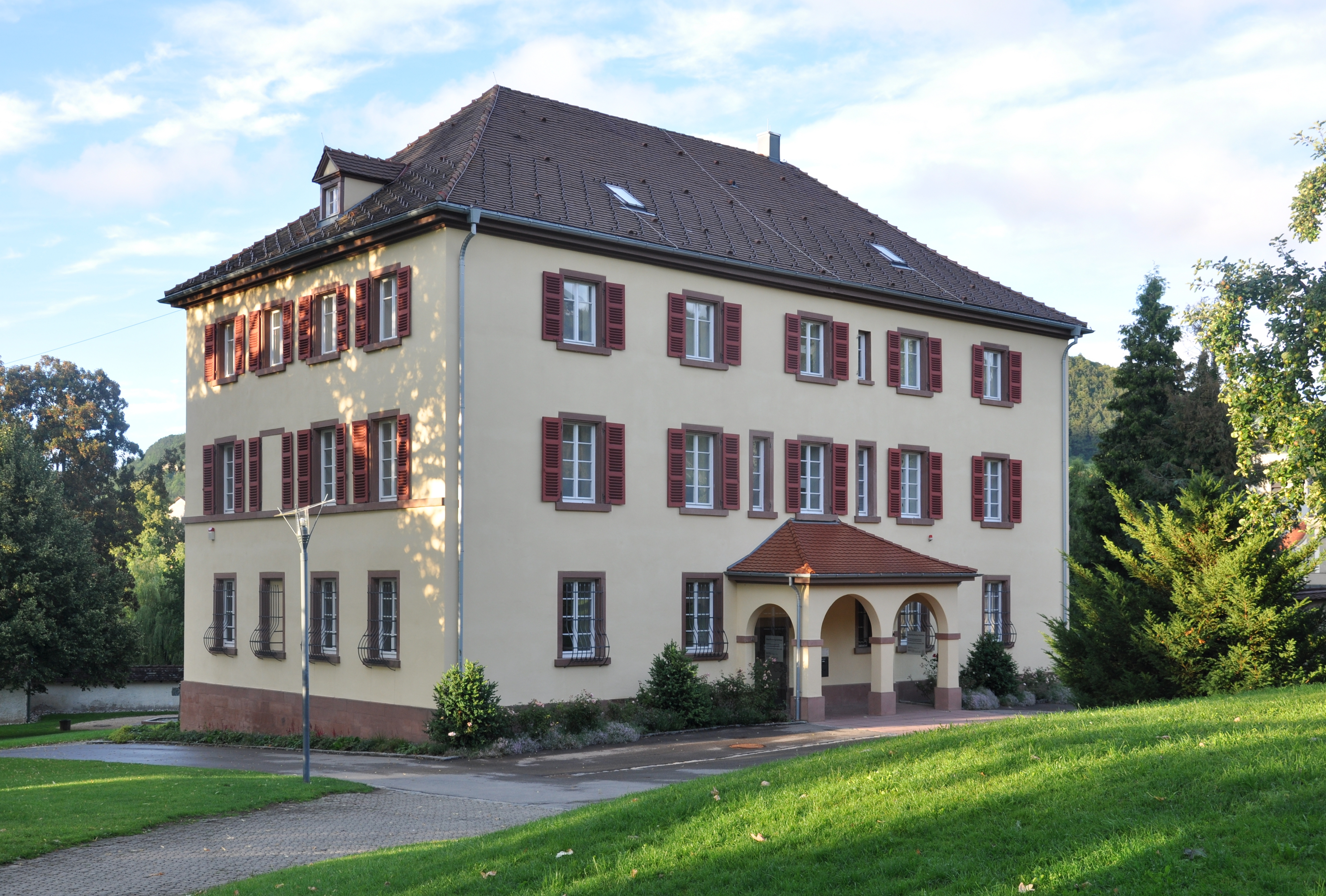
Schloss Lautlingen

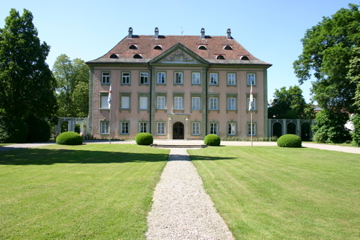
Schloss Rißtissen

After 1918, when the Weimar Constitution abolished all noble titles in Germany and declared them to be part of the family name, the family came to have two names in order to preserve the former titles of Schenk, Graf (Count) and Freiherr (Baron) as parts of the surnames.

Since the title of Schenk is considered to be of superior rank due to being a hereditary office title, it is placed before the noble title, which in turn is placed before the surname. The correct versions of the family's surnames are thus Schenk Graf von Stauffenberg and Schenk Freiherr von Stauffenberg respectively. Two of the family's members also served as Prince-Bishops – of Bamberg (Marquard Sebastian), and of Augsburg and Konstanz (Johann Franz) – and thus they used the title of Fürst (Prince) instead of their other noble titles, such as Imperial Count.

== Notable family members ==
- Marquard Sebastian Schenk von Stauffenberg, Prince-Bishop of Bamberg (14 May 1644 – 9 Oct 1693)
- Johann Franz Schenk von Stauffenberg. Prince-Bishop of Constance (1658–1740)
- Franz August Schenk von Stauffenberg (1834–1901), German politician and lawyer
- Franz Schenk Freiherr von Stauffenberg (1878–1950), German nobleman, landowner, businessman and politician
- Melitta Schenk Gräfin von Stauffenberg (9 Jan 1903 – 8 Apr 1945), German aristocrat
- Berthold Schenk Graf von Stauffenberg (15 Mar 1905 – 10 Aug 1944), German aristocrat and lawyer
- Alexander Schenk Graf von Stauffenberg (15 Mar 1905 – 27 Jan 1964), German aristocrat and historian
- Claus Schenk Graf von Stauffenberg (15 Nov 1907 – 21 Jul 1944), German army officer
- Nina Schenk Gräfin von Stauffenberg (27 Aug 1913 – 2 Apr 2006), German aristocrat
- Berthold Maria Schenk Graf von Stauffenberg (born 3 Jul 1934), German Bundeswehr general
- Franz-Ludwig Schenk Graf von Stauffenberg (born 4 May 1938), German politician
- Philippe von Stauffenberg (born 17 May 1964), German businessman

== See also ==
- Master of the Stauffenberg Altarpiece
