= Alexander Schenk Graf von Stauffenberg =

German historian (1905–1964)

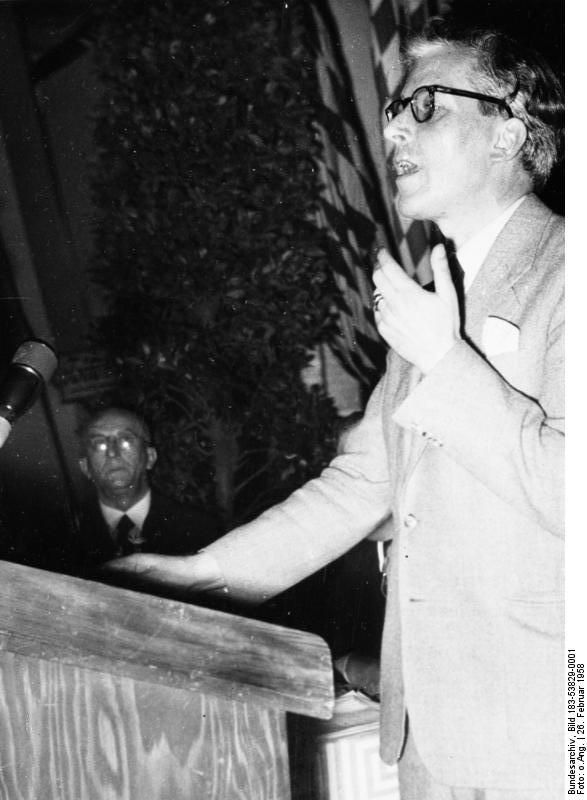
Stauffenberg in 1958

Count Alexander von Stauffenberg (German: Alexander Franz Clemens Maria Schenk Graf von Stauffenberg; 15 March 1905 – 27 January 1964) was a German aristocrat and historian. His twin brother Berthold Schenk Graf von Stauffenberg and younger brother Claus Schenk Graf von Stauffenberg were among the leaders of the 20 July Plot against Hitler in 1944.

== Early life ==
The brothers were born into the old and distinguished aristocratic South German Catholic Stauffenberg family. Their parents were the last Oberhofmarschall of the Kingdom of Württemberg, Alfred Schenk Graf von Stauffenberg, and Caroline née Gräfin von Üxküll-Gyllenband. Among Alexander's ancestors were several famous Prussians, including August von Gneisenau. His name points to the imperial Hohenstaufen mountain and castle.

Alexander Schenk Graf von Stauffenberg went to school in Stuttgart and studied ancient history at Heidelberg University, the University of Jena, the Ludwig-Maximilians-Universität München, and the University of Halle. He and his brothers were introduced by Albrecht von Blumenthal to the circle of the mystic symbolist poet Stefan George, many of whose followers later worked for the German Resistance to National Socialism.

== Career ==
Alexander von Stauffenberg earned a Ph.D. in 1928 in Halle and habilitated in 1931 at the University of Würzburg about Hiero II of Syracuse. He lectured at the Friedrich Wilhelm University of Berlin, the University of Giessen, and at the University of Würzburg, where he was appointed assistant professor in 1936 and professor in 1941, after having been wounded in Russia. He accepted a call to the Reichsuniversität Straßburg in December 1942, but had to serve in the army again, first at the Eastern Front, where he was wounded again in late 1943. He used the time to finish a book about Stefan George, called Tod des Meisters. In July 1944, Alexander was in Athens as a lieutenant at the artillery command of the 68th Army Corps.

== 20 July Hitler Assassination Plot ==
=== Alexander's background ===
Because of Alexander's tendency to be outspoken, and because his wife was of Jewish ancestry, his brothers refrained from telling him about their plot to assassinate the Führer. On 11 August 1937 at Berlin-Wilmersdorf, Alexander had married the aviator and aeronautical engineer Melitta Schiller, who had been released from Germany's DVL institute in 1936, probably due to her criticism of the regime and her lack of full Aryan status. Although she had been reinstated and was very active developing and testing warplanes, she might nevertheless have been under surveillance.

=== Post-plot ===
In 1944, after the 20 July Plot failed, Alexander von Stauffenberg did not take the opportunity to escape to Egypt but returned to Berlin to defend himself. He was arrested, as his wife and all others bearing the family name had been. After his arrest, Stauffenberg told the Gestapo that he "took the view that the Jewish question should have been dealt with in a 'less extreme manner' because then it would have produced less disturbance among the population".

Alexander von Stauffenberg's brothers were executed. He and the rest of the adult family members were held in concentration camps. However, Alexander's wife, Melitta Schenk Gräfin von Stauffenberg, was released on 2 September 1944, because of her importance in the development of aircraft. She was now called "Gräfin Schenk", since Hitler wanted to erase the name Stauffenberg. She still maintained contact and support for the imprisoned members of the family. In the final weeks of the war, Melitta was looking for her husband in the concentration camps, and got a Gestapo authorisation to visit the commandant at Schönberg where he had been taken. During the visit, her aircraft was shot down by an American fighter; she died hours later of injuries from the attack and crash-landing.

In late April 1945, Alexander Schenk Graf von Stauffenberg was transferred to Tyrol together with about 140 other prominent inmates of the Dachau concentration camp, where the SS left the prisoners behind. He was liberated by the Fifth U.S. Army on 5 May 1945.

== Postwar ==
In 1948, Alexander Graf Stauffenberg became a professor of ancient history at the Ludwig-Maximilians-Universität München, where he remained until his death. In 1951, he became the founder and first president of the Kommission für Alte Geschichte und Epigraphik, which became a part of the German Archaeological Institute. His field of research focused on late antiquity, ancient Sicily, and Magna Graecia.

== Personal life ==
On 11 August 1937 at Berlin-Wilmersdorf, Alexander Stauffenberg married the aviator and aeronautical engineer Melitta Schiller (3 January 1903 – 8 April 1945) who served as a test pilot in the Luftwaffe before and during World War II.

He remarried on 23 July 1949 to Marlene Hoffmann, born at Gross Roppershausen (now Großropperhausen) on 10 July 1913.

== Bibliography ==
- Karl Christ, Der andere Stauffenberg. Der Historiker und Dichter Alexander von Stauffenberg (München, C.H.Beck, 2008).
- Ernst Probst/Heiko Peter Melle: Sturzflüge für Deutschland: Kurzbiografie der Testpilotin Melitta Schenk Gräfin von Stauffenberg. Grin-Verlag, München 2012, ISBN 978-3-65625-609-0
- Mulley, Clare (2017). The Women Who Flew For Hitler. Macmillan. ISBN 978-1-4472-7420-9.
