= Berthold Schenk Graf von Stauffenberg =

German aristocrat and lawyer (1905–1944)

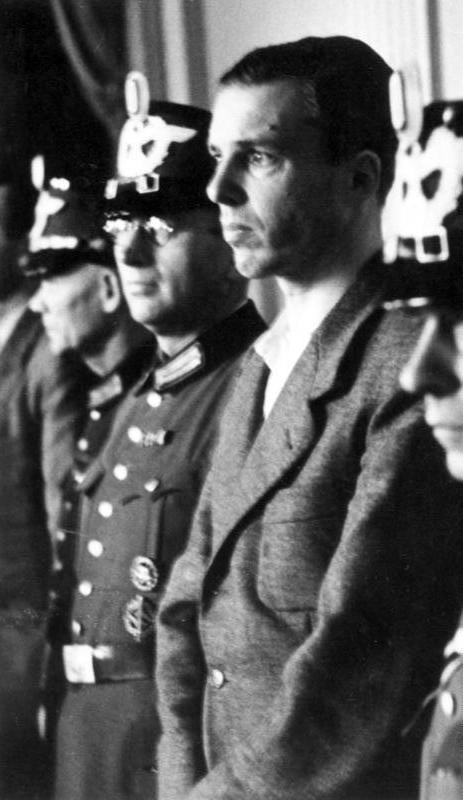
- Graf von Stauffenberg at the Volksgerichtshof
- Born: 15 March 1905; Stuttgart, Kingdom of Württemberg, German Empire
- Died: 10 August 1944 (aged 39); Plötzensee Prison, Berlin, Nazi Germany
- Cause of death: Execution by hanging
- Known for: 20 July plot coordinator
- Spouse: Maria (Mika) Classen
- Parent(s): Alfred Schenk Graf von Stauffenberg; Caroline Schenk Gräfin von Stauffenberg
- Relatives: Claus Schenk Graf von Stauffenberg; Alexander Schenk Graf von Stauffenberg

Berthold Alfred Maria Schenk Graf von Stauffenberg (15 March 1905 – 10 August 1944) was a German aristocrat and lawyer who was a key conspirator in the plot to assassinate Adolf Hitler on 20 July 1944, alongside his younger brother, Colonel Claus Schenk Graf von Stauffenberg. After the plot failed, Berthold was tried and executed by the Nazi regime.

== Early life ==
Berthold was the oldest of three brothers (the second being Berthold's twin, Alexander Schenk Graf von Stauffenberg) born into an old and distinguished aristocratic South German Catholic family. His parents were the last Oberhofmarschall of the Kingdom of Württemberg: Alfred Schenk Graf von Stauffenberg and Caroline née von Üxküll-Gyllenband. Among his ancestors were several famous Prussians, including most notably Generalfeldmarschall August Graf von Gneisenau.

In his youth, he and his brothers were members of the Neupfadfinder, a German Scout association and part of the German Youth movement.

After having studied law at Tübingen, he became assistant professor of international law at the Kaiser Wilhelm Institute of Foreign and International Law in 1927. He and his brother Claus were introduced by Albrecht von Blumenthal to the circle of the mystic symbolist poet Stefan George, many of whose followers became members of the German Resistance to National Socialism. He worked at The Hague from 1930 to 1932 and in 1936 married Maria (Mika) Classen (1900–1977). They had two children: Alfred Claus Maria Schenk Graf von Stauffenberg (1937–1987) and Elisabeth Caroline Margarete Maria Schenk Gräfin von Stauffenberg (b. 13 June 1939). He lived with his family in Berlin-Wannsee.

== Career and coup attempt ==
In 1939, he joined the German Navy, working in the High Command as a staff judge and advisor for international law.

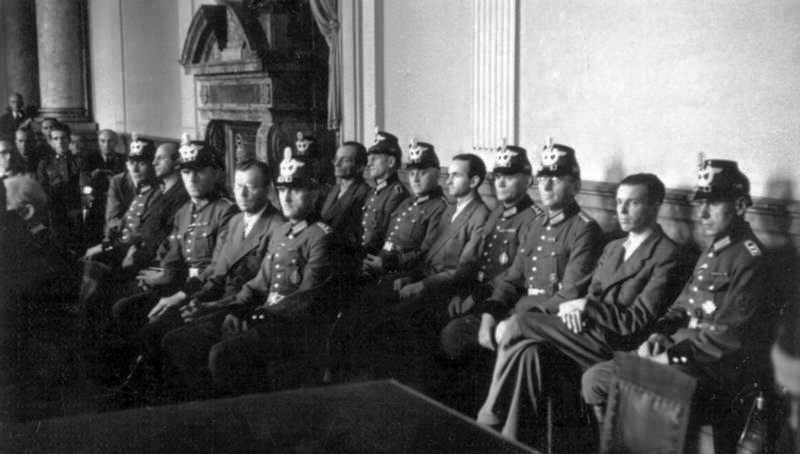
Graf von Stauffenberg at the Volksgerichtshof

Berthold's apartment at Tristanstraße in Berlin, where his brother Claus also lived for some time, was a meeting place for the 20 July conspirators, including their cousin Peter Yorck von Wartenburg. As Claus had access to the inner circle around Hitler, he was assigned to plant a bomb at the Führer's briefing hut at the military high command in Rastenburg, East Prussia, on 20 July 1944. Claus then flew to Rangsdorf airfield south of Berlin, where he met with Berthold. They went together to Bendlerstraße, which the coup leaders intended to use as the centre of their operations in Berlin.

Hitler survived the bomb blast, and the coup failed. Berthold and his brother were arrested at Bendlerstraße the same night. Claus was executed by firing squad shortly afterwards.

After his arrest, Stauffenberg was questioned by the Gestapo about his views on the "Final Solution to the Jewish Question". Stauffenberg told the Gestapo that "he and his brother had basically approved of the racial principle of National Socialism, but considered it to be 'exaggerated' and 'excessive'." Stauffenberg went on to state,

The racial idea has been grossly betrayed in this war in that the best German blood is being irrevocably sacrificed, while simultaneously Germany is populated by millions of foreign workers, who certainly cannot be described as of high racial quality.

Berthold was tried in the Volksgerichtshof ("People's Court") by Roland Freisler on 10 August and was one of eight conspirators executed by strangulation, hanged in Plötzensee Prison, Berlin, later that day. Before he was killed, Berthold was strangled and then revived multiple times. The entire execution and multiple resuscitations were filmed for Hitler to view at his leisure.

== Sources ==
- Hoffmann, Peter (1994). The second world war, German society and internal resistance to Hitler, In 'Contending with Hitler: Varieties of German Resistance in the Third Reich' (1994 ed.). Cambridge University Press. ISBN 978-0-521-46668-4.
