= Sargeant =

Sargeant may refer to:

== People ==
- Sargeant (surname), a list of people with the surname

== Places ==
- Sargeant, Minnesota, U.S.
- Sargeant Township, Mower County, Minnesota, U.S.

== See also ==
- Sergeant, a senior enlisted military rank
- Sergeant (disambiguation)
- Sargent (disambiguation)
