= Sargent =

Sargent or Sargents may refer to:

== Places ==
- Sargent, California
- Sargents, Colorado
- Sargent, Georgia
- Sargent, Scott County, Missouri
- Sargent, Texas County, Missouri
- Sargent, Nebraska
- Sargents, Ohio
- Sargent, Texas
- Sargent County, North Dakota
- Sargent Icefield, Prince William Sound, Alaska
- Sargent Township (disambiguation)

== Other ==
- Sargent (name), includes a list of people with the name
- Sargent (film), a 1977 Pakistani Urdu language action thriller film
- CLIC Sargent, UK cancer charity

== See also ==
- Sargant (disambiguation)
- Sergeant (disambiguation)
- Justice Sargent (disambiguation)
- Sarjeant (disambiguation)
