= Sargent (name) =

- Gender: Male

Origin
- Origin: Old French and Middle English
- Meaning: Soldier (servant of the law), or Protector
- Region of origin: Britain

Other names
- Related names: Sargeant, Sergius, Sergeant

Sargent is a surname of Latin (possibly Etruscan), early medieval English and Old French origin, and has also been used as a given name.

== Background ==
The surname of Sargent in the various ways in which it is spelled is said to have come from the Latin phrase, "servientes armorum" (men discharging a military service) and therefore, soldiers [Sergeant] ("Serjens d'Armes"); and "Serjiant of the Law" [Serjeant-at-law] ("Serviens ad Legem") was also a term in very early use. The English translation of Serviens into Sargent did not appear until the reign of Henry III or Edward I. Today, the surname has many variant spellings ranging from Sargant, Sargeant and Seargeant to Sergant, Searjeant and Sergeaunt.

== Surname ==
Notable people with the name include:

=== In arts and entertainment ===
- Alvin Sargent (1927–2019), American screenwriter
- Carl Sargent (1952–2018), British author of role-playing games
- Dick Sargent (1930–1994), American actor known for his role in Bewitched
- Edward Sargent (architect) (1842–1914), American architect
- Frances Sargent Osgood (née Locke) (1811–1850), American poet
- Henry Sargent (1770–1845), American painter and soldier
- Herb Sargent (1923–2005), American television writer and producer
- Ida Sargent (1893–1989), English musician, composer and radio presenter
- John Singer Sargent (1856–1925), portrait artist
- Joseph Sargent (1925–2014), American film director
- Judith Sargent Murray (1751–1820), American women's rights advocate and writer
- Kenny Sargent, American musician and disc jockey
- Kevin Sargent (composer), film and television composer
- Lia Sargent, American voice actress
- Malcolm Sargent (1895–1967), British conductor, organist and composer
- Margaret Holland Sargent (born 1927), American portrait artist
- Martin Sargent (born 1975), American television personality
- Pamela Sargent (born 1948), American science fiction writer
- Richard Sargent (1911–1978), American illustrator
- Robert F. Sargent (fl. 1944), American war photographer
- Roger Sargent (photographer) (born 1970), a British photographer

=== Politicians ===
- Aaron A. Sargent (1827–1887) American journalist, lawyer, politician and diplomat
- Bradley Varnum Sargent (1828–1893), American politician
- Bradley V. Sargent Jr. (1863–1940), American politician
- Eddie Sargent (1915–1998), Canadian politician
- Francis W. Sargent (1915–1998), American politician
- Gregory Sargent, American politician
- John Sargent (1750–1831), British Member of Parliament for Seaford, Bodmin and Queenborough
- John Sargent (merchant) (1792–1874), Canadian merchant, farmer and politician
- John Sargent (1799–1880), American politician
- Narciso Joseph Alegre y Sargent (1911–1980), Filipino civil liberties advocate
- Trevor Sargent (born 1960), Irish politician
- Winthrop Sargent (1753–1820), American politician

=== Scientists and engineers ===
- Anneila Sargent (born 1942), Scottish–American astronomer
- Bernice Weldon Sargent (1906–1993), Canadian physicist
- Charles Sprague Sargent (1841–1927), American botanist
- Frederick LeRoy Sargent (1863–1928), American botanist
- Oswald Hewlett Sargent (1880–1952), Australian botanist and plant collector
- Roger Sargent (1926–2018), chemical engineer
- Thomas J. Sargent (born 1943), American economist
- Wallace L. W. Sargent (1935–2012), British-American astronomer
- Winifred Sargent (1905–1979), English mathematician
- Edward H. Sargent, Canadian scientist

=== Soldiers ===
- John Sargent (Loyalist) (1750–1824), Loyalist officer during the American Revolutionary War
- John Neptune Sargent (1826–1893), commander of British troops in China, Hong Kong and the Straits Settlements
- Paul Dudley Sargent (baptized 1745–died 1828), privateer and soldier in the Continental Army during the American Revolutionary War
- Ruppert L. Sargent (1938–1967), American soldier

=== In sports ===
- April Sargent, American figure skater
- Bill Sargent (1907–1963), American football coach
- Danyelle Sargent (born c. 1978), American sports television reporter
- Frank Sargent (sports executive) (1902–1988), a Canadian executive in ice hockey and curling
- Gary Sargent (born 1954), Native American ice hockey player
- George Sargent (golfer) (1882–1962), English golfer
- James Sargent (born 1973), American hockey player
- Josh Sargent (born 2000), American soccer player
- Kevin Sargent (American football) (born 1969), American football player
- Logan Sargent (born 2000), American racing driver
- Mark Sargent (born 1964), Australian rugby league footballer
- Mekhi Sargent (born 1997), American football player
- Mitchell Sargent (born 1979), Australian rugby league footballer
- Murray Sargent (1928–2012), Australian cricketer
- Tom Sargent (racing driver) (born 2003), Australian racing driver

=== Other ===
- Alonzo Sargent (1866–1942), American locomotive engineer
- Amanda (Aimee) Sargent (1885–1945), spouse of Philippines Senator Juan B. Alegre
- Ben Sargent (born 1948), American editorial cartoonist
- C. B. R. Sargent (1906–1943), British educator and clergyman
- Charlie Sargent, British criminal
- Cornelia Sargent, lawyer, chair of the Albert Einstein Institution
- Daniel Wycliffe Sargent (1850–1902), British explorer
- David Sargent (born 1929), American lawyer and academic
- Dwight E. Sargent (1917–2002), American journalist
- Frank P. Sargent (1854–1908), American trade union functionary
- George Sargent (businessman) (1859–1921), Australian businessman
- Henry Winthrop Sargent (1810–1882), American landscape gardener
- Irene Sargent (1852–1932), American art historian
- James Sargent (1824–1910), American locksmith and businessman
- John G. Sargent (1860–1939), American lawyer and U.S. Attorney General
- John Turner Sargent (born c. 1956), American publisher
- Kevin Sargent, several people
- Lucius Manlius Sargent (1786–1867), American author, antiquarian and temperance advocate
- Lydia Sargent (1942–2020), American feminist
- Mark K. Sargent, American proponent of the flat Earth conspiracy theory
- Sir Orme Sargent (1884–1962), British diplomat and civil servant
- Shirley Sargent (1927–2004), American local historian

=== Fictional characters ===
- John Sargent, alter ego of the DC Comics character Sargon the Sorcerer c. 1941
  His grandson David Sargent inherited this alter ego.
- Joe Sargent, a bus driver in the horror novella The Shadow over Innsmouth by H.P. Lovecraft.

== Given name ==
- Sargent Claude Johnson (1888–1967), Harlem Renaissance artist
- Sargent Kahanamoku (1910–1993), Native Hawaiian aquatic athlete
- Robert Sargent Shriver (1915–2011), American politician and activist

== See also ==
- Sargant (surname)
- Sargeant (surname)
- Sergeant (surname)
- Sergius (name)
