= Cuyler Presbyterian Church =

Church in Brooklyn, New York

- U.S. National Register of Historic Places
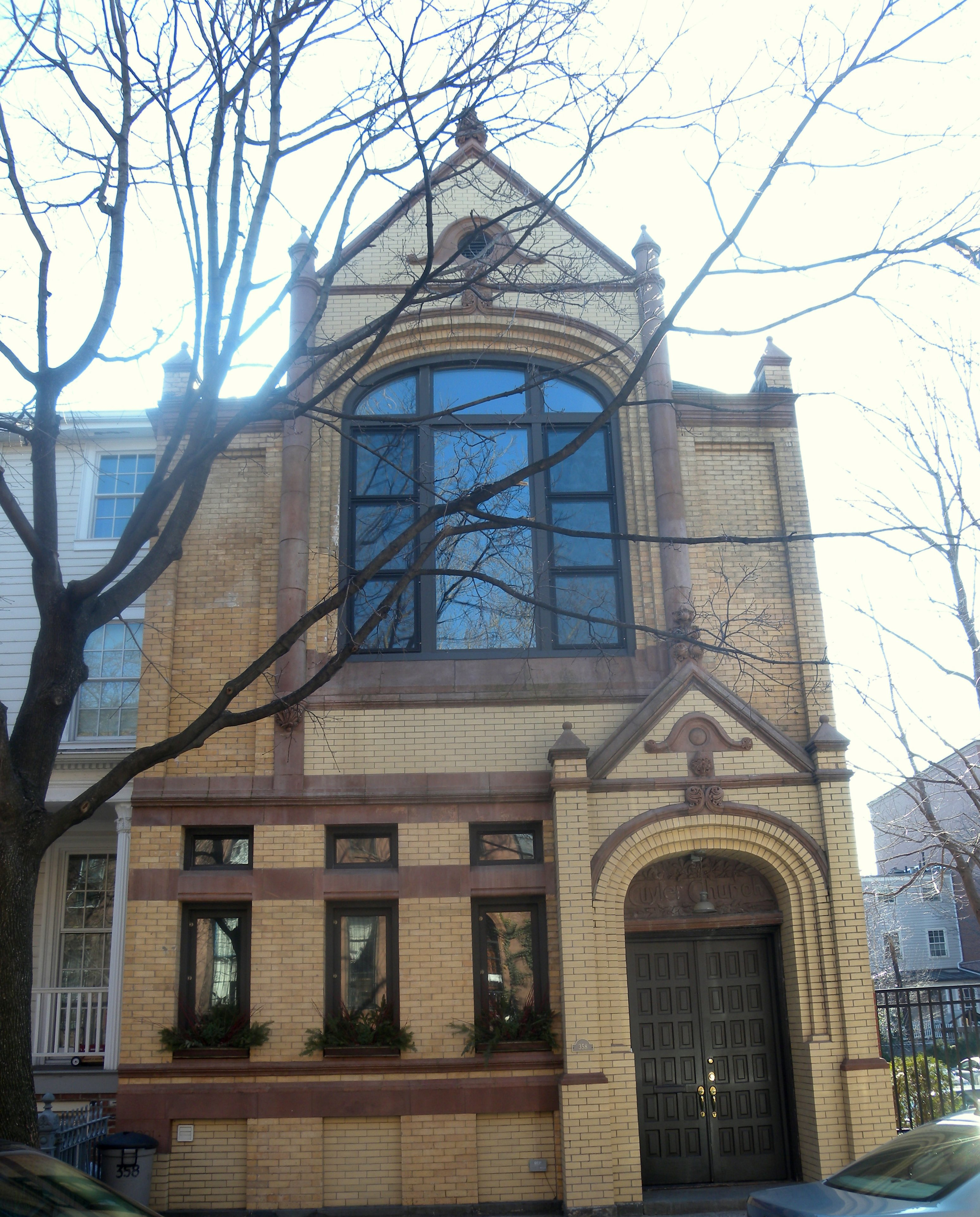
- Former Cuyler Presbyterian Church, February 2011

- Location within New York City Location within New York Location within the United States
- Location: 358–360 Pacific St., Brooklyn, New York
- Coordinates: 40°41′12″N 73°59′11.3″W
- Area: 0.5 acres (0.20 ha)
- Built: 1892
- Architect: Sargent, Edward A.
- Architectural style: Greek Revival
- NRHP reference No.: 01000253
- Added to NRHP: March 23, 2001

Cuyler Presbyterian Church, also known as Cuyler Chapel and Cuyler Presbyterian Church and Parsonage, is a historic Presbyterian church at 358–360 Pacific Street in Brooklyn, New York, New York. It was designed by architect Edward Sargent (1842–1914). It was built in 1892 and is a two-story rectangular plan building with a steeply pitched, slate covered gable roof and molded terra cotta copings. It was converted to a private residence in the early 1980s. The former parsonage was built c. 1851 and is a Greek Revival style dwelling.

The church served as the cornerstone for the Mohawk community in Boerum Hill (formerly known as North Gowanus). The Mohawk called their neighborhood "Little Caughnawaga," after their homeland in Canada. For nearly 50 years, most Mohawk in New York lived within 10 square blocks in Brooklyn; they were from Kahnawake, a reserve in Quebec, Canada. The men were ironworkers known as Mohawk skywalkers on the bridge and skyscraper projects of New York. The women, some of whom had gone to New York separately for economic opportunity, and others who were wives and mothers, worked in a variety of jobs, as well as creating community for their families.

The church was added to the National Register of Historic Places in 2001.

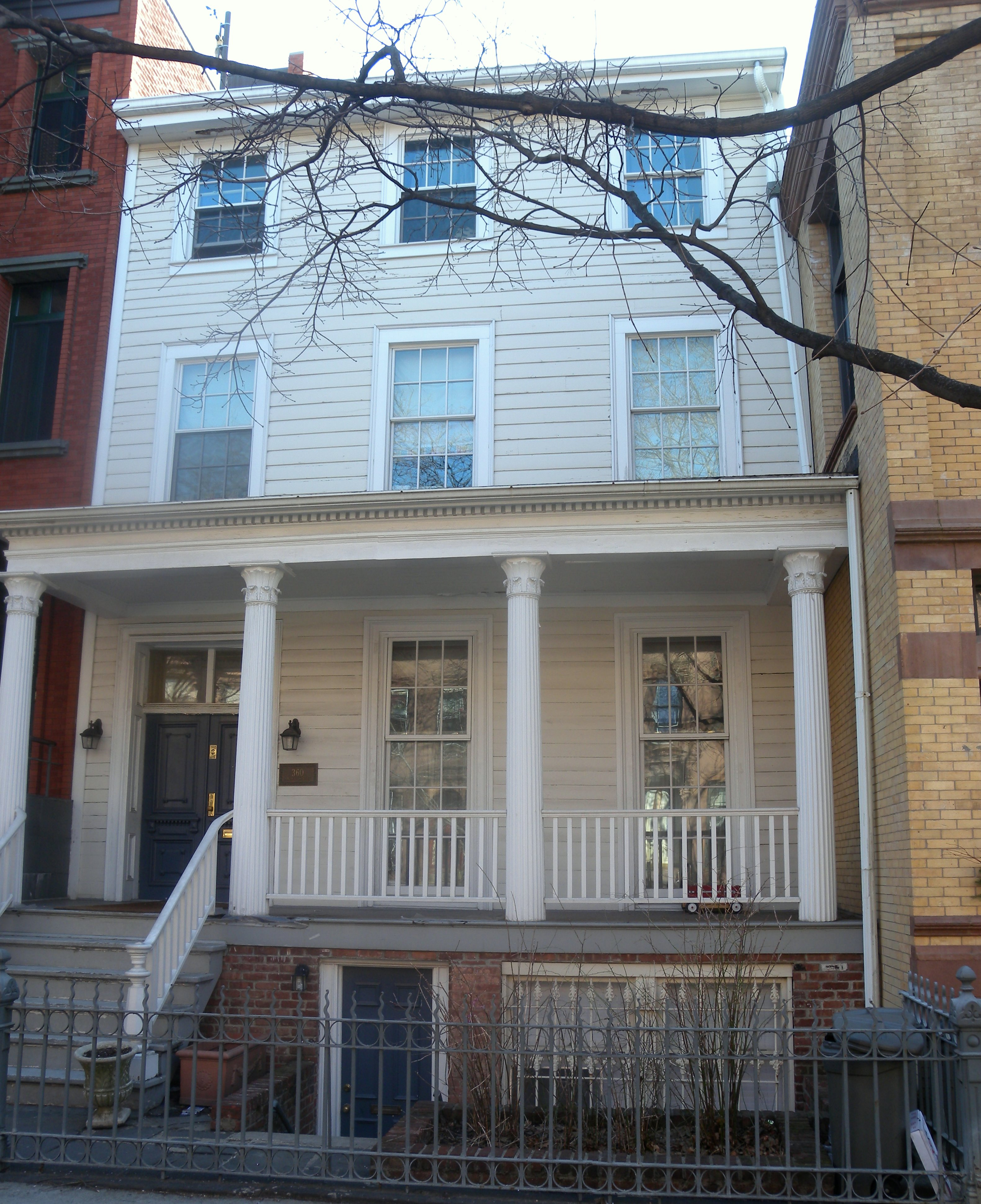
Parsonage

== See also ==
- Theodore L. Cuyler
