= Sergeant (disambiguation) =

Sergeant is a police or military rank.

Sergeant may also refer to:

== Entertainment ==
- Sergeant (band), an indie band from Glenrothes, Scotland
- Sergeant (Ender's Shadow), a character in Orson Scott Card's novel Ender's Shadow
- The Sergeant (1910 film)
- The Sergeant (1968 film), a 1968 drama starring Rod Steiger
- The Sergeant (1991 film), an Iranian film directed by Masoud Kimiai
- Sergeant (film), a 2023 Indian Hindi-language film

== Other uses ==
- Sergeant (surname)
- Sergeant Township, Pennsylvania, United States
- Sergeant's Crag, Lake District, England
- Sergeant (Sweden and Finland), a military rank
- MGM-29 Sergeant, a US short-range rocket of the 1960s
- Sergeants, butterflies in the genus Athyma

== See also ==
- Sargant (disambiguation)
- Sargent (disambiguation)
- Serjeant (disambiguation)
