= Sergeant (surname) =

Sergeant is a surname. Notable people with the surname include:

- Adeline Sergeant (1851–1904), English writer
- Edward Guthlac Sergeant (1881–1961), English chess master
- Elizabeth Shepley Sergeant (1881–1965), American journalist and writer
- George Sergeant (1881–1971), American attorney and mayor of Dallas, Texas
- Howard Sergeant (1914–1987), British poet and editor
- Jack Sergeant (born 1995), Gibraltarian footballer
- Jack Sargeant (politician) (born 1994). Welsh politician
- John Sergeant (priest) (1623–1707 or 1710), English Roman Catholic priest, controversialist and theologian
- John Sergeant (missionary) (1710–1749), American missionary to the Mahicans of Stockbridge
- John Sergeant (politician) (1779–1852), American politician and member of the US House of Representatives from Pennsylvania
- John Sergeant (journalist) (born 1944), British journalist and broadcaster
- Jonathan Dickinson Sergeant (1746–1793), lawyer, representative for New Jersey in the Second Continental Congress in 1776 and 1777 and Attorney General of Pennsylvania
- Lewis Sergeant (1841–1902), English journalist and author
- Malcolm Sargent (1895–1967), British orchestra conductor
- Marc Sergeant (born 1959), Belgian former professional road bicycle racer and team manager
- Peta Sergeant (born 1980), Australian actress
- Peter Sergeant (died 1714), English-born merchant in Boston, Massachusetts
- Philip Walsingham Sergeant (1872–1952), British chess and history writer
- Richard Sergeant (died 1586), beatified English Roman Catholic priest and martyr
- Sharon Sergeant (born 1947), American forensic genealogist
- Thomas Sergeant (1782–1860), American lawyer, judge, and politician
- Tony Sergeant (born 1977), Belgian football midfielder
- Will Sergeant (born 1958), English guitarist best known as a member of Echo & the Bunnymen

== See also ==
- Sargeant (surname)
- Sargent (name)
- Harry Sergeaunt (1891–1959), English footballer
- Edmond Sergent (1876–1969), French parasitologist
- Robert Bertram Serjeant (1915–1993), a British Arabist
- Sergius
