= Charles Bridges (politician) =

Australian politician

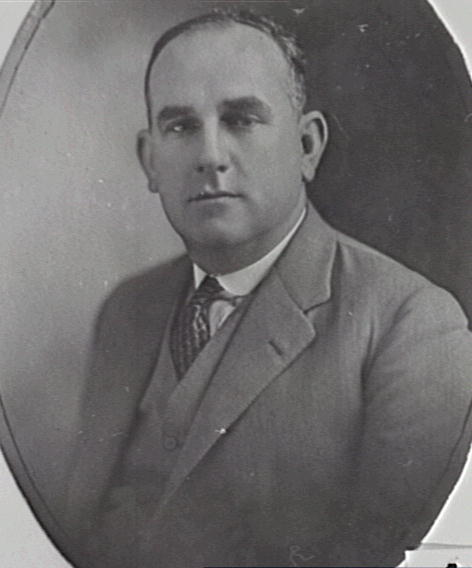
Charles Bridges

Charles Brill Bridges (7 March 1881 – 17 June 1955) was an Australian politician.

== Early life ==
He was born at Carcoar to leaseholder Henry Bridges. He was educated in Victoria and became a caterer.

== Career ==
He was a Paddington alderman from 1917 to 1922 and served on Sydney City Council from 1918 to 1921 and from 1922 to 1924. He was a Labor member of the New South Wales Legislative Council from 1925 to 1937 and from 1940 to 1943.

In 1928, when he was the chairman and General Manager of Sargents Limited but no longer an alderman, he was implicated in corruption associated with a contract for the new Bunnerong Power Station.

== Family ==
On 12 July 1900 he married Beatrice Camilla Leisner, with whom he had one son.

== Death ==
Bridges died at Wahroonga in 1955.
