= Sargent Township =

Sargent Township may refer to:

- Sargent Township, Douglas County, Illinois
- Sargent Township, Texas County, Missouri
- Sargent Township, Custer County, Nebraska
- Sargent Township, North Dakota

== See also ==
- Sargeant Township, Mower County, Minnesota
