= Serjeant =

Serjeant may refer to:

- The holder of a serjeanty, a type of feudal land-holding in England
- A generally obsolete spelling of sergeant, although still used in some British Army regiments, notably The Rifles
- Serjeant-at-arms, an officer appointed to keep order during meetings
- Serjeant-at-law, an obsolete class of barrister in England and Ireland
- Craig Serjeant (born 1951), Australian former cricketer
- Serjeant (horse), a British Thoroughbred

== See also ==
- Marcus Sarjeant (born 1964), person who fired six blank shots at Queen Elizabeth II in 1981
- Sergeant (disambiguation)
