= Waverley Cemetery =

Cemetery in New South Wales, Australia

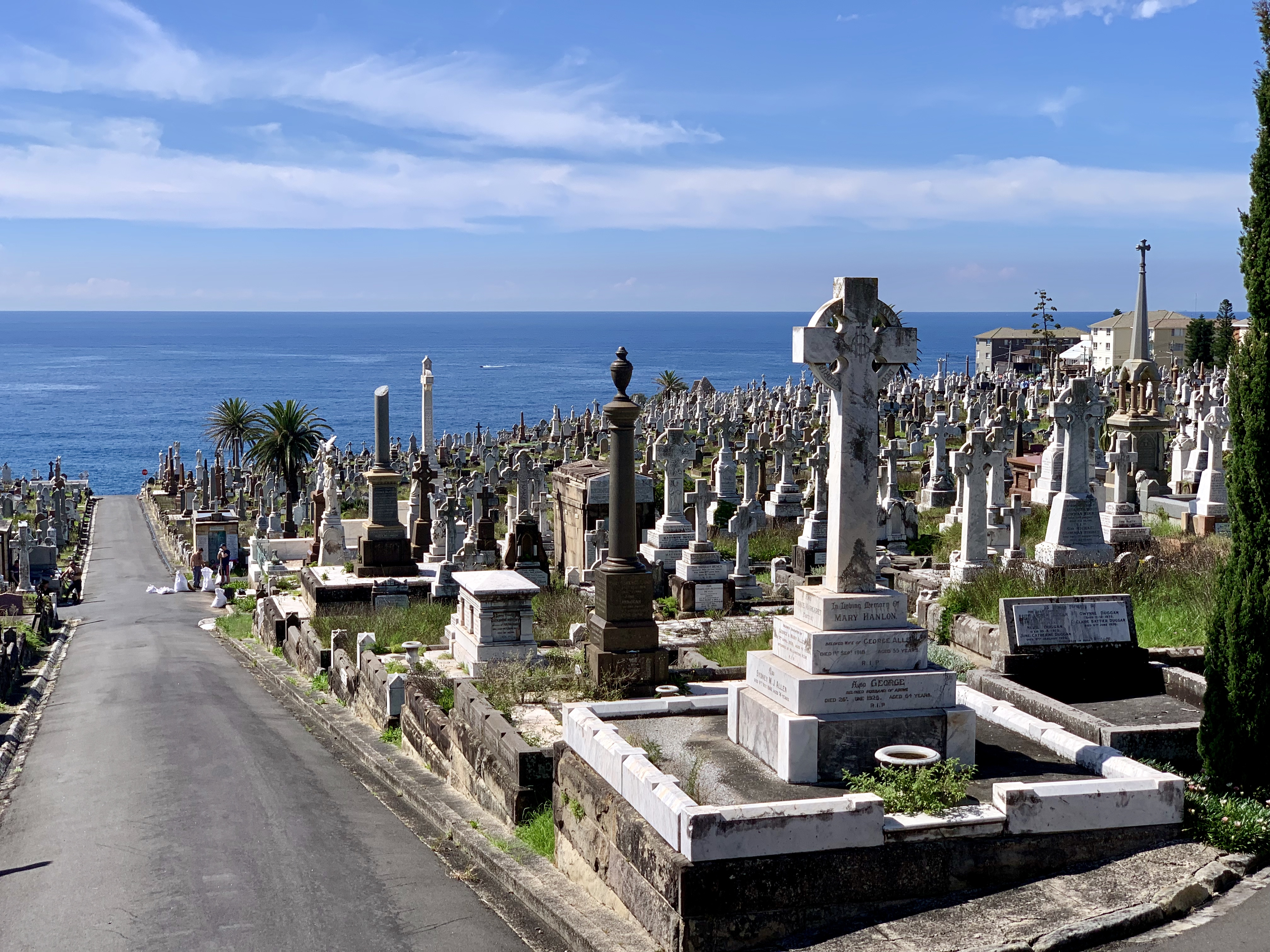
- Waverley Cemetery
- Interactive map of Waverley Cemetery

Details
- Established: 1877
- Location: St Thomas Street, Bronte, New South Wales
- Country: Australia
- Coordinates: 33°54′26″S 151°15′51″E
- Type: Category II Local Govt Business
- Owned by: Waverley Council
- Size: 17 hectares (41 acres)
- No. of graves: 50,000
- Website: Waverley Cemetery

New South Wales Heritage Register
- Official name: Waverley Cemetery; Waverley Cemetery; General Cemetery Waverley
- Type: State heritage (complex / group)
- Designated: 28 October 2016
- Reference no.: 1975
- Type: Cemetery/Graveyard/Burial Ground
- Category: Cemeteries and Burial Sites
- Builders: R. Watkins (cemetery lodge, 1878); P. Beddie (cemetery office. 1915)

The Waverley Cemetery is a heritage-listed cemetery on top of the cliffs at Bronte in the eastern suburbs of Sydney, New South Wales, Australia. Opened in 1877 and built by R. Watkins (cemetery lodge, 1878) and P. Beddie (cemetery office, 1915), the cemetery is noted for its largely intact Victorian and Edwardian monuments. It is regularly cited as being one of the most beautiful cemeteries in the world. The cemetery contains the graves of many significant Australians including the poet Henry Lawson. Also known as General Cemetery Waverley, it was added to the New South Wales State Heritage Register on 28 October 2016.

The cemetery is owned by Waverley Council and is self-funded, deriving its income from interments – including burial, cremation, memorials and mausolea – of which there has been over 86,000. Waverley Cemetery was used during the filming of the 1979 Mel Gibson film Tim and in 2021 the film Long Story Short. The cemetery was designed to function along similar lines to Père Lachaise Cemetery in Paris and Kensal Green Cemetery in London.

Funerals are conducted Monday to Saturday.

== History ==
=== Indigenous history ===
The land on which Waverley Cemetery is located is traditionally the land of the Cadigal people of the Eora nation. As with most Aboriginal groups in Australia prior to European colonisation, the Cadigal people lived a traditional hunter-gatherer lifestyle that utilised the natural resources available in their environment to achieve the physical and spiritual nourishment to sustain their way of life. Evidence of the areas occupation by the Cadigal people is demonstrated in both archaeological (rock shelters, art sites, middens) and non-archaeological forms (creation sites, ceremonial places). Today, the Waverley area is a densely populated and urban environment and, although Waverley Cemetery is not known to contain identified Aboriginal sites (to date), its cliff top environment is regarded as archaeologically sensitive as it is considered likely to contain sites of Aboriginal significance.

=== Colonial history ===
European exploration into the coastal region of eastern Sydney commenced in the early 19th century when the establishment of a military outpost at South Head and the completion of the first roadway to the South Head Lighthouse (1811) gave settlers their first cursory view of the coastal landscape of the new colony. The opening up of the region soon saw the allocation of early land grants to prominent settlers in the locality.

In the early years of the colony, the first cemetery (although never formally gazetted) was established on the outskirts of the town on the site of today's Sydney Town Hall. At the time of its selection and development in the 1790s, the Old Sydney Burial Ground reflected the attitudes of the European colonists of the period towards death and burial – essentially relegating cemeteries to the periphery of the colony out of fear of ill-health, disease and contamination from the dead. At this time, cemeteries were a necessity and not a place of remembrance and commemoration.

By 1820, the Old Sydney Burial Ground was considered full and a new cemetery was laid out at Devonshire Street (Brickfield Hill), today's Sydney's Central railway station. Soon enough, by the middle of the century, this cemetery too was at capacity and an alternative location for the Sydney Necropolis was sought. In keeping with common social values, Haslem's Creek (now Rookwood Cemetery) was selected as the new location in 1862. Sited on the outskirts of both the Sydney and Parramatta settlements, Haslem's Creek was also served by the main western railway line. The relocation of burial services away from central Sydney soon caused difficulties for those living along the eastern coastline and those residents quickly became reliant on St. Jude's Anglican Church, Randwick (1853). Although a cemetery was planned from the 1840s, interments did not take place at South Head General Cemetery until 1869.

Waverley Municipal Council, itself only proclaimed in 1859, soon recognised that a general cemetery was needed to service the developing community of the eastern suburbs and, in 1868, reserved A£1,200 to purchase four hectares (ten acres) for the establishment of the cemetery. Although the selected land remained on the periphery of the community, social attitudes towards death and burial had shifted by this time, away from those held during the early years of the colony. Society now desired picturesque, garden-like spaces where people could visit, remember and commemorate those who had passed. Cemeteries were no longer to be dark and forbidding places, avoided out of fear and paranoia. Following the purchase of a further 4.9 hectares (12 acres), Waverley Cemetery was formally opened on 1 August 1877 and its first interment (of Ruth Allen, 85 years), took place on the afternoon of 4 August 1877. From its first intimations, Waverley Cemetery was to be a grand metropolitan cemetery honouring the high moral standard and respect of the Victorian era and it would reflect the social prosperity of the Waverley community.

To manage the operation of the new facility, William Thomas was appointed as the first manager of Waverley Cemetery in 1877. Responsible for its day-to-day operation, Thomas conducted the development of the cemetery in accordance with a strict set of bylaws that governed its objectives with particular regard to style, layout and colours of headstones, grave sites and funerary furniture.

Laid out professionally as a cemetery of the Victorian style and with its recurring use of ethereally white Italian Carrara marble, Waverley Cemetery soon resembled a strategic collection of individual memorials that portrayed a cohesive and unified visual character. Perhaps because of this visually pleasing effect when coupled with its dramatic natural setting, the cemetery proved to be highly popular with the community and its establishment costs were recovered entirely within the first year.

In the years following its establishment and with the extension of the steam tramway to the site in 1890, Waverley Cemetery expanded with the acquisition of a further 7.3 hectares (18 acres) of land and by 1894 the cemetery had grown to its present size of 17 hectares (41 acres) bounded by Trafalgar, Boundary and St Thomas streets. It also saw the construction of a number of built elements on the site including the Caretaker's House, Cemetery Lodge, Waiting Room, Cemetery Gates, shelters, external fencing, sandstone walling and grounds terracing.

Commenced in 1898 and completed by 1901, a substantial memorial to the 1798 Irish Rebellion was constructed at the cemetery. A large and imposing monument of white Carrara marble, intricately decorated with sculptures, plaques, inscriptions, medallions and mosaic and topped with a 30-foot carved cross, the monument was to be a testament to Ireland's struggle for self-government and its patriots who fought in the rebellion. Designed by John Hennessy of architectural firm Sherrin and Hennessy, the memorial is the largest monument to the rebellion in the world. Elevating it to a somewhat sacred status, the memorial contains the interred remains of the leader of the revolution movement, Michael Dwyer (d. 1825) and his wife Mary (d.1860). Originally buried at Sydney's Sandhills Cemetery (the site of today's Central railway station), the Dwyers were exhumed and reinterred at Waverley Cemetery in 1898. Attended by some 100,000 people, the relocation and interment of the Dwyers was the largest gathering of any 1798 rebellion centenary event in the world.

Waverley Cemetery continued to expand throughout the 20th century, both in numbers and architectural diversity. The grand Victorian era of its establishment slowly morphed into the humbler Edwardian times which saw the introduction of cremation services to the cemetery. Its ongoing use also saw the installation of a substantial collection of funerary monuments that ranged in fashion and style, reflecting the cultural diversity and social values of the people of NSW.

The Great Depression and the world wars bought further change to the cemetery and to the monuments and memorials that were being installed.

Over its lifetime, Waverley Cemetery has received numerous high-achieving, famous and notable people from across NSW, Australia and the world, including: Henry Lawson (writer and poet); Henry Kendall (poet); Dorothea Mackellar (poet); Jules François Archibald (journalist and benefactor of the Archibald Prize); Sir Frances Forbes (first Chief Justice of NSW); Sarah "Fanny" Durack (Olympic gold medal swimmer); William Dymock (book retailer); Nicholas Weekes (prominent freemason); John Fingleton OBE (Australian Cricketer and "Bodyline" veteran) and Lawrence Hargrave (aviator and inventor).

Waverley Cemetery continues to be an operational burial facility today (2015). Its naturally picturesque and urban location has made it a particularly sought after and desirable cemetery and it now contains more than 100,000 burials and interments.

Major coastal storms over a weekend in June 2016 led to the collapse of some 77,000m2 of fill in the gully in the centre of the cemetery. The Bondi-to-Bronte coastal walk through the cemetery was closed but has reopened, but the original route hugging the cliff face has been changed for safety concerns.

Environment & Heritage Minister Mark Speakman announced on 23 October 2016 the State Heritage Register listing of Waverley Cemetery. "Waverley Cemetery is the final resting place of many prominent Australians, Mr Speakman said. " Poets Henry Lawson and Dorothea Mackellar...Olympic gold medal swimmer Sarah "Fanny" Durack and cricket batsman Victor Trumper are all buried in Waverley'. Member for Coogee Bruce Notley-Smith said the heritage listing would be warmly received by the eastern suburbs community.

In April 2017 the 1922 Sir Charles Wade memorial was restored with grant funding from the NSW government, and Waverley Council secured a community war memorial fund grant to do a conservation assessment of the 1894 Middle Head Submarine Mine Explosion Monument.

== Description ==
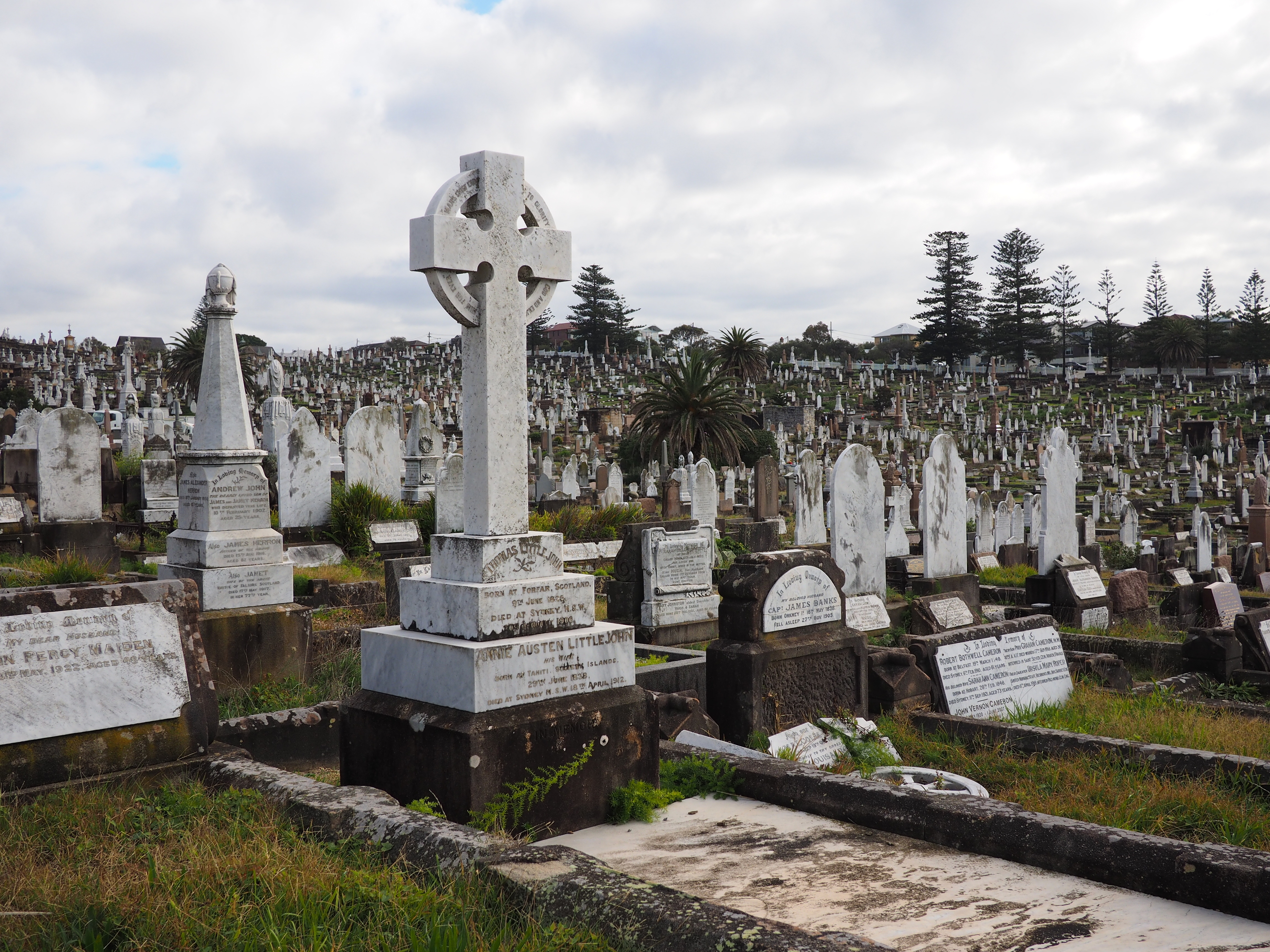
Graves at Waverley Cemetery

Waverley Cemetery is uniquely positioned on an elevated urban site overlooking the Tasman Sea to the east and the Waverley townscape to the west. Spanning some 16 hectares, Waverley Cemetery retains much of its Victorian layout and geometric grid-like pattern of burials (north–south axis).

Despite its suburban environment, Waverley Cemetery is dominated by its cliff top location and its expansive views to the ocean and horizon. The contrast of the natural and man-made elements combine to create a picturesque setting for the cemetery.

Containing over 90,000 burials and interments, Waverley Cemetery is dominated by white marble monuments and headstones from the mid-to-late 19th century as well as a selection of later funerary furniture that demonstrate the changing social values and attitudes towards death it has experienced during its operation (1877 to present). The cemetery also contains various additions to older elements for example the Circle Garden containing interment of ashes created in a former garden area.

Inside its boundaries, the cemetery forms its own enclosed townscape where, apart from the ocean view to the east, all other major views are within the cemetery itself across its own landscape and monuments. This occurs because the cemetery occupies a valley and two adjacent ridges. Major monuments and memorials within Waverley Cemetery are situated at key points such as at the junction of main roads and pathways and other key vantage points at the edge of cemetery sections. Major monuments prominent in the landscape include the 1798 Memorial; the Governor Duff monument; the Henry Kendall monument; the Johnston family vault; the Greek Revival monument to Sir James Martin; and the Chowder Bay Monument.

The 1798 Memorial has a central theme of martyrdom. The architect's brief called for "a monument in Irish architecture" to the memory of the 1798 rebels. The design was on an imposing scale calculated to make a strong impact. The design was also heavily influenced by the chairman of the organising committee Dr Charles MacCarthy (1848–1919), who was an award-winning sculptor, painter, musician and writer. The base of the memorial is 9.1 metres (30 ft) wide and 7.3 metres (24 ft) deep. The back wall rises 3.0 metres (10 ft) above the ground and the height of the cross is 9.1 metres (30 ft). The main material is Carrara marble. The rear wall is decorated with bronze plaques and the floor has mosaic pictures of thatched cottages and round towers. Commemorations are conducted inside the memorial which effectively forms a "church sanctuary" or stage while onlookers gather on the surrounding driveways and paths. The monument was erected by Ross and Bowman (stonemasons). The memorial is located in the centre of Waverley Cemetery, facing north at the end of a 180-metre (590 ft) main driveway.

Another individual monument of significance is the Stuart family vault. Dating from 1914 to 1916 this is a surviving work from the partnership of Walter Burley Griffin, Marion Mahony Griffin and J. Burcham Clamp. James Stuart was the founding partner of Stuart Brothers, master builders. The tomb is situated on a prominent junction at the terminal point of two large retaining walls. Built of granite the vault features gothic detailing with a pyramindal roof form built from slabs of stone. Twin doors in heavy bronze face the ocean on the eastern side of the vault. These are cast with a prismatic pattern that at head height forms a double set of diamond shaped vents. The doors are flanked by polished granite tablets with gilded inscriptions to the memory of members of the Stuart family. Other detailing includes buttresses with lancet tracery and more prismatic patterning around the cornice of the vault. There is a granite urn near the entry doors. On the western wall a round ended cross is formed by the intersection of four granite blocks, which also provides ventilation for the vault.

Waverley Cemetery contains a number of early buildings, independent structures and built elements. The cemetery office, residence and amenities building are located at the entrance of the cemetery while a number of shelters are within the cemetery itself. The cemetery also contains substantial sandstone retaining walls and terracing, pathways, and remnants of sandstone road kerbing and guttering. The cemetery also retains key landscape elements including mature Norfolk Island Pines on the boundaries, Canary Island Date Palms within the cemetery and numerous remnant historic shrubs and grave plantings and more recently established garden areas.

=== Condition ===
As at 13 April 2015, historically a self-sustaining facility, funded entirely by the sale of grave plots and interments, Waverley Cemetery is in reasonable condition due to the past allocation of funds towards maintenance over the lifetime of the cemetery. In recent years, some areas of the cemetery have deteriorated. The cemetery is susceptible to damaging forces. As well as human vandalism and general age-related deterioration, the cemetery is also particularly vulnerable to environmentally-caused salt corrosion (metalwork), wind erosion (masonry) and algae and lichen growth on the headstones. Maintenance of individual grave plots is the responsibility of the family of the deceased and therefore some plots are in a more degraded condition than others.

Dominated by white Carrara marble monuments of the mid-to-late 19th century, alternative materials have been introduced to Waverley Cemetery during its operation. Coloured granite (predominantly black and rose), however sparingly used, does detract from the Victorian nature of the site.

== Historical significance ==
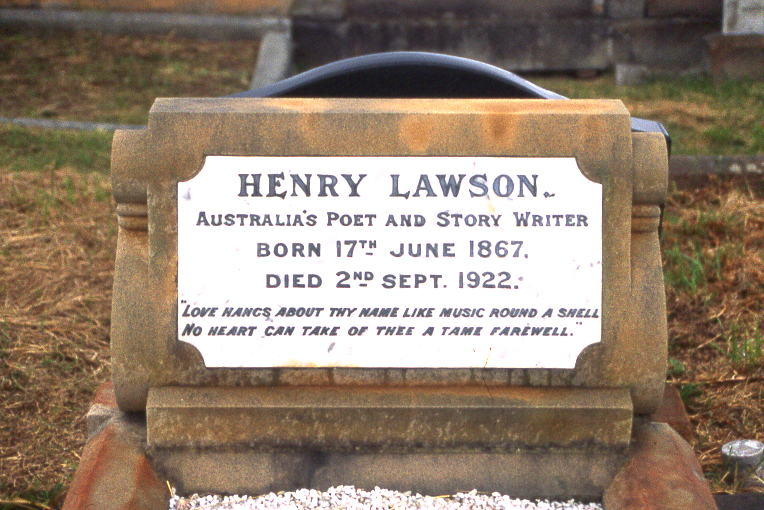
Grave of Henry Lawson

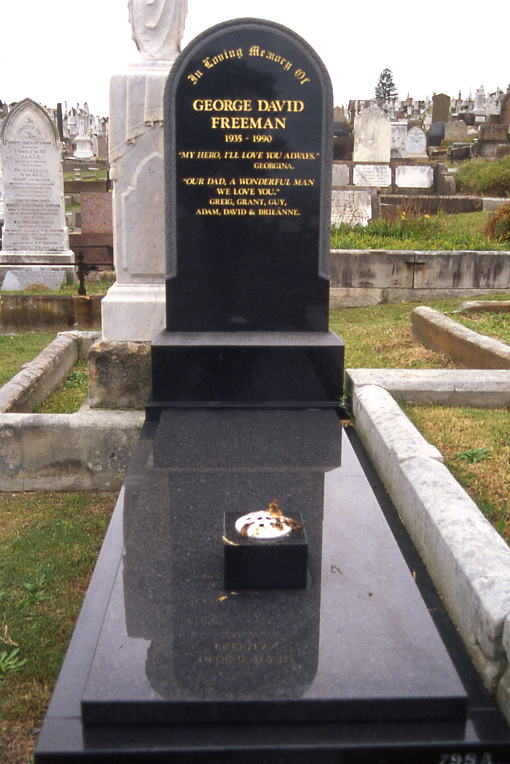
Grave of George Freeman

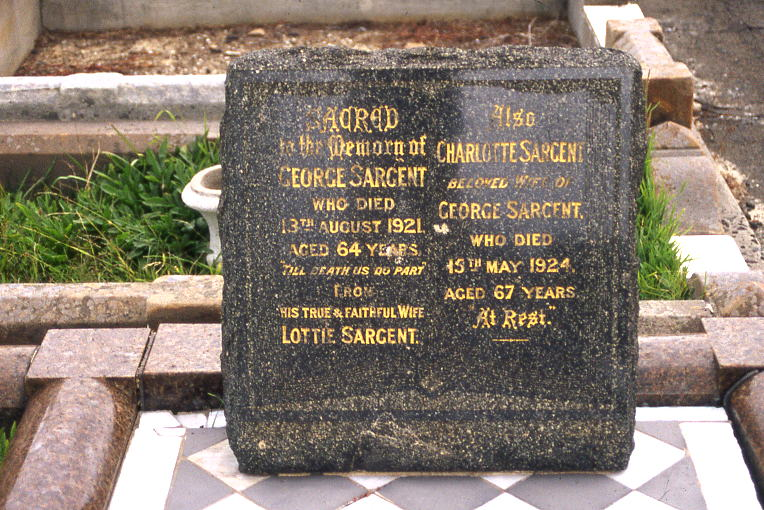
Graves of George and Charlotte Sargent

Waverley Cemetery contains the graves of many people who shaped Australia. This includes literary figures such as Henry Lawson, (one of Australia's most famous poets), Jules Archibald, founder of The Bulletin and benefactor of the Archibald Prize, nineteenth century writer Louis Becke, nineteenth century Australian boxing champion Larry Foley, nineteenth century poet Henry Kendall, the American actor William E. Sheridan, poet and author Dorothea Mackellar, and author Ethel Pedley. Other significant figures include aeronautical pioneer Lawrence Hargrave, Olympic swimmer Fanny Durack, and New South Wales Premier Sir James Martin, (whose remains were transferred to Waverley Cemetery after the death of his wife in 1909).

The cemetery contains over 200 war graves from various past conflicts, of which there are 132 registered and maintained by the Commonwealth War Graves Commission (over 100 from World War I and nearly 20 from World War II). The front gates are a memorial to the residents of the area who died during World War I and World War II . Inside the main gates is a memorial to the military forces of NSW which houses the remains of several officers killed in an 1891 sea mine explosion at Middle Head. At least eleven United States Civil War veterans are also buried at Waverley, including Phineas S. Thompson. In addition, the cemetery is home to the Irish memorial, the final resting place of Michael Dwyer (1798 Rebellion), and a memorial to all those who died in that rebellion. There is also a memorial stone commemorating the 1981 Hunger Strikers. As well as nationally famous figures the cemetery contains the graves of notable Sydney identities including Robert ('Nosey Bob') Howard, the state executioner who served until 1904, rugby player Peter Burge and Sydney crime figure George Freeman.

Architecturally, Waverley Cemetery is significant in that it showcases examples of Stonemasonry and funerary art dating back from the 19th century, with features (such as the gates, buildings and fencing) that due to their intact nature are considered of "outstanding aesthetic value". Included in this is a tomb designed for James Stuart and his family by the architects J. Burcham Clamp and Walter Burley Griffin.

== Heritage listing ==
Waverley Cemetery is listed as a heritage item in the Waverley Council Local Environment Plan. In 2015 local resident action group Residents for Waverley Cemetery nominated the cemetery for inclusion on the State Heritage Register. The nomination was recommended by the Heritage Council and after receiving Ministerial approval was gazetted on 28 October 2016. In 2016 Waverley Council nominated Waverley Cemetery for inclusion on the National Heritage list.

As at 13 August 2015, Waverley Cemetery is of state heritage significance as a general public Victorian-era cemetery that is the final resting place for more than 100,000 people. Sited in an urban setting, against a dramatic natural landscape of the Pacific Ocean with its steep cliffs and the endless horizon, Waverley Cemetery is a picturesque urban burial ground that contains a collection of highly intact funerary monuments and furniture dating from 1877.

Its earliest elements demonstrate the moral standards and religious philosophies of the Australian community in the Victorian period and, through the continuity of the cemetery's use to the present day and the gradual introduction of alternative funerary designs and interment practices throughout the years, the cemetery demonstrates the cultural diversity and changing social values and attitudes of the Australian people towards death and its commemoration over some 140 years. The aesthetic continuity of Waverley Cemetery is largely due to the strict management of the cemetery in the early periods of its development.

Waverley Cemetery is of state heritage significance for its association with a number of high-achieving, famous and notable people from across NSW, Australia and the world. Some of its most famous names include Henry Lawson (writer and poet); Dorothea Mackellar (poet); Jules Francoise Archibald (journalist and benefactor of the Archibald art prize); Sir James Martin (NSW Premier); Sarah "Fanny" Durack (Olympic gold medal swimmer); members of the Cavill family of famous swimmers – Arthur, Charles, Ernest and Frederick Cavill; William Dymock (book retailer); Victor Trumper (batsman from the "Golden Age" of cricket); Lawrence Hargrave (aviator and inventor); Nicholas Weekes (prominent freemason); and Michael Dwyer (revolutionary leader of the 1798 Irish Rebellion).

As an operational general public cemetery, Waverley Cemetery is of state heritage significance for its demonstration of the historic and contemporary social character of Sydney and NSW. Waverley Cemetery contains a wealth of genealogical, historical, architectural and artistic information which makes it a significant public educational resource for NSW.

Internationally, the Waverley Cemetery has been reported to be one of the most beautiful cemeteries in the world – among the likes of England's Highgate Cemetery and Pere Lachaise Cemetery in Paris.

Waverley Cemetery was listed on the New South Wales State Heritage Register on 28 October 2016 having satisfied the following criteria.

The place is important in demonstrating the course, or pattern, of cultural or natural history in New South Wales.

Waverley Cemetery is of state heritage significance as a general public Victorian-era cemetery that is the final resting place for more than 100,000 people.

Opened in 1877, in the picturesque cemetery design of the mid-to-late 19th century, the geometric layout and early funerary monuments of Waverley Cemetery demonstrate the moral standards and religious philosophies of the Australian community in the Victorian period. Through the continuity of the cemetery's use to the present day, and the gradual introduction of alternative funerary designs and interment practices throughout the years, the cemetery demonstrates the cultural diversity and changing social values and attitudes of the Australian people towards death and its commemoration over some 140 years.

The place has a strong or special association with a person, or group of persons, of importance of cultural or natural history of New South Wales's history.

Waverley Cemetery is of state heritage significance for its association with a number of high-achieving, famous and notable people from across NSW, Australia and the world. Operating for over a century and the final resting place for over 100,000 people, Waverley Cemetery has buried and interred a diverse selection of notable people from literary, business, arts, political and sporting backgrounds.

Some of its most famous names include Henry Lawson (writer and poet); Henry Kendall (poet); Dorothea Mackellar (poet); Jules Francoise Archibald (journalist and benefactor of the Archibald art prize); Sir Frances Forbes (first Chief Justice of NSW); Sir James Martin (NSW Premier); Sarah "Fanny" Durack (Olympic gold medal swimmer); members of the Cavill family of famous swimmers – Arthur, Charles, Ernest and Frederick Cavill; William Dymock (book retailer); Victor Trumper (batsman from the "Golden Age" of cricket); John Fingleton OBE (Australian Cricketer and "Bodyline" veteran); Nicholas Weekes (prominent freemason); Lawrence Hargrave (aviator and inventor) and George Freeman (Sydney organised crime figure).

Waverley Cemetery contains over 200 various war graves from past conflicts, including over 100 burials from World War I and nearly 20 from World War II. At least eleven United States Civil War veterans are also buried at Waverley Cemetery.

Waverley Cemetery also houses the 1798 Memorial, a commemorative monument to those "Who dared and suffered for Ireland" in the rebellion led by the United Irishmen of 1798. This memorial is also final resting place of Michael Dwyer, "The Wicklow Chief" a revolutionary leader of the 1798 Irish Rebellion who died in Sydney in 1825. The remains of Michael Dwyer and his wife were moved from the Devonshire Street Cemetery to Waverley Cemetery in 1898 (the centenary of the 1798 Rebellion). The 1798 Memorial commemorates subsequent events such as the Easter Rising of 1916 and the Long Kesh Hunger Strikes of 1981 (additional tablet at rear).

The place is important in demonstrating aesthetic characteristics and/or a high degree of creative or technical achievement in New South Wales.

Waverley Cemetery is of state heritage significance for its aesthetic values.

Sited in an urban setting, against a dramatic natural landscape of the Pacific Ocean with its steep cliffs and the endless horizon, Waverley Cemetery is a picturesque urban burial ground that contains a collection of highly intact funerary monuments and grave furniture of a refined palette (marble and stone) which demonstrates a comprehensive range of Victorian and Edwardian artistic elements. Many monuments feature statuary such as angels, cherubs, seraphs, mourning figures and occasional portrait medallions or busts; substantial pedestals topped with urns or spires; and Christian crosses. Smaller monuments such as stone desks often include carved decorations using floral relief, birds, crowns, and other symbolism. There is a consistent palette of materials throughout the site which is dominated by sandstone and white marble with inlaid lead lettering – granite, trachyte and other materials are less prominent.

Inside its boundaries, the cemetery forms its own enclosed townscape where, apart from the ocean view to the east, all other major views are within the cemetery itself across its own landscape and monuments. The cemetery retains a nineteenth century layout with many roadways still lined with sandstone kerbs, gutters and drains.

The architecture and design of much of its earlier elements from the Victorian period reflect the social attitudes towards death and commemoration at the time of its construction. However the ongoing use and expansion of the cemetery has seen the gradual introduction of alternative funerary styles and fashions that reflect the cultural diversity and evolution of the people of NSW over time.

Waverley Cemetery includes an unusual suite of cemetery structures including the main entry gates with iron palisade fence and sandstone pillars; the nearby sandstone office and waiting room building with associated residence and amenities buildings and a series of shelter sheds and sandstone retaining walls throughout the site. The cemetery also retains key landscape elements including mature Norfolk Island Pines on the boundaries, Canary Island Date Palms within the cemetery and numerous remnant historic shrubs and grave plantings.

Major monuments and memorials within Waverley Cemetery are situated at key points such as at the junction of main roads and pathways and other key vantage points at the edge of cemetery sections. This makes these major monuments prominent items in the landscape when within the cemetery. Examples include the Irish Martyrs' Memorial; the Governor Duff monument; the Henry Kendall monument; the Johnston family vault; the Greek Revival monument to Sir James Martin; and the Chowder Bay Monument.

Internationally, the Waverley Cemetery has been reported to be one of the most beautiful cemeteries in the world – among the likes of England's Highgate Cemetery and Paris's Pere Lachaise Cemetery.

The place has a strong or special association with a particular community or cultural group in New South Wales for social, cultural or spiritual reasons.

As an operational general public cemetery, Waverley Cemetery is of state heritage significance for its demonstration of the historic and contemporary social character of Sydney and NSW. The fabric of the cemetery reflects the cultural and religious diversity of the Australian community since 1877 and its contemporary social significance is increased by its public accessibility and use by residents and visitors by virtue of its central metropolitan location.

Prominent individuals and families are buried or interred at the cemetery and, as a genealogical resource, Waverley Cemetery is a significant educational asset for NSW.

The place has potential to yield information that will contribute to an understanding of the cultural or natural history of New South Wales.

Waverley Cemetery is of state heritage significance for its educational and research potential. With its wealth of genealogical, historical, architectural and artistic information, Waverley Cemetery is a significant and readily accessible resource that is available to much of the NSW population by virtue of its central metropolitan location.

The craftsmanship of the funerary monuments, demonstrated by rich examples from the Victorian, Edwardian and Inter-War eras, reflects social values and attitudes towards death and mourning in NSW since 1877. Furthermore, the array of funerary ornamentation demonstrates the changes in social fashions and taste over the decades and serve to reflect the impact of many international events on the activities of people in NSW (such as the Depression and the world wars).

The place possesses uncommon, rare or endangered aspects of the cultural or natural history of New South Wales.

Cemeteries of the same historical period are generally similar in layout, style and purpose but Waverley Cemetery is a notable example in NSW for its distinctive and picturesque setting on the Bronte cliff tops. The siting makes the cemetery both a place of remembrance as well as a passive recreational facility as part of the popular and well-known coastal walk from Bondi to the popular beaches of Bronte, Clovelly and Coogee.

Once sited on the periphery of the Sydney colony, the retention of Waverley Cemetery in its now urban and desirable setting has seen the cemetery become a strikingly significant and intact open space in metropolitan Sydney.

The place is important in demonstrating the principal characteristics of a class of cultural or natural places/environments in New South Wales.

Waverley Cemetery is of state heritage significance as a representative example of a burial ground that can demonstrate the principle characteristics of a general public cemetery from the Victorian period in NSW. The geometric layout and early funerary monuments of the Waverley Cemetery reflect the social values and attitudes of the Australian community towards death and commemoration in the mid-to-late 19th century.

The ongoing operation of the cemetery and the gradual introduction of different styles and funerary fashions can also demonstrate the changing attitudes of the community towards funerary practices in NSW over time.

== Operation ==
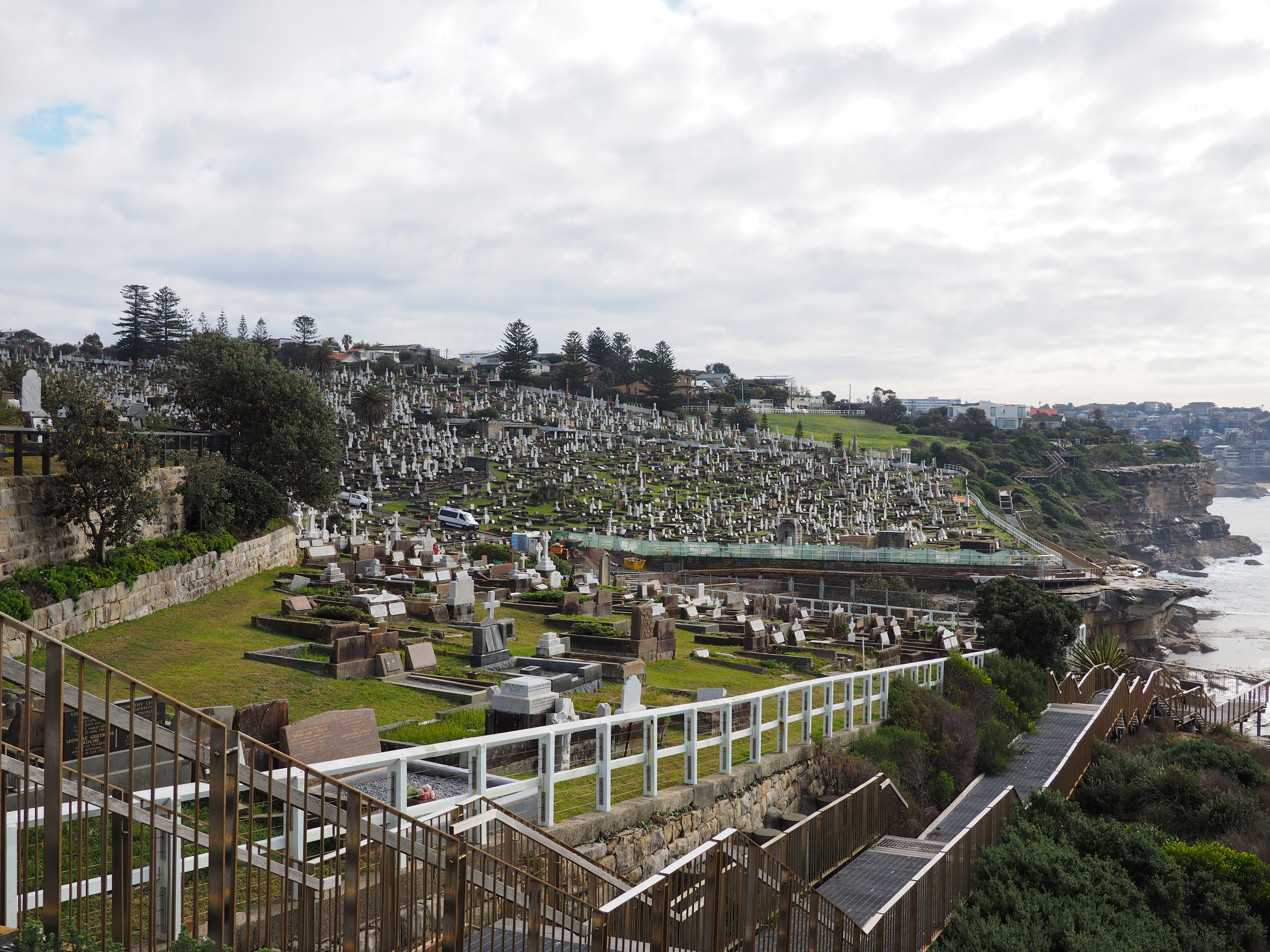
Waverley Cemetery and the boardwalk for the Bondi to Coogee Coastal Walk in 2018

The cemetery after more than 130 years of operation remains an entirely self-funded business. It has never been funded by the public purse or council ratepayers, with individual graves maintained for a fee. Where families no longer wish to maintain their ancestor's graves this has led to some significant memorials (such as those belonging to Jules Archibald and Victor Trumper) falling into disrepair. In 2002, the Waverley Council as owners of the business looked for alternative sources of revenue. These included corporate and private sponsorship for grave sites, and a proposed crematorium. This sponsorship plan met with limited success, although some graves have been restored with the assistance of sponsors – including Jules Archibald's (by The Bulletin), Lawrence Hargrave's through the Royal Aeronautical Society, and the grave of Henry Lawson which was restored through a $10,000 grant by the State government. The plan to incorporate an on-site cremation into the existing business encountered vocal opposition, including by Liberal Party MP Malcolm Turnbull, the Federal Member for Wentworth, who spoke in Federal Parliament against the plan. The community opposition led to the plan being cancelled in 2004. A two million dollar boardwalk designed to move joggers and others passersby away from the graves is now a popular part of the Bondi to Coogee Coastal Walk.

In late 2007, the National Trust ran an online competition to determine the distribution of $185,000 in funding. Of the nine finalists, the Waverley Cemetery's ceremonial gates proved to be the most popular, winning the majority of the votes. Unfortunately, the amount voted to the project was only a little over 25% of the total restoration costs. Waverley Council has committed to funding the balance and work on this project is commencing in 2016.

== Cultural influences ==
The earliest known motion picture filmed at the cemetery was the 1977 Italian production 'La Ragazza dal pigiama giallo', also known as 'The Pyjama Girl Case', a murder story based on the true story of Linda Agostini, the Pyjama Girl. In 1972 the cemetery was featured in filming for Spyforce where Colonel Cato played by Redmond Phillips was supposedly buried. In 1978 the cemetery was a location in filming of the movie Newsfront starring Bill Hunter and Bryan Brown. In 1979 the cemetery was a location in filming of the movie Tim starring Mel Gibson. Baywatch used the cemetery while filming its Australian movie length episode, and the Australian soap opera Home and Away buried one of their characters at Waverley in 2004. In 1996, scenes from the season one final of Australian TV show Water Rats were filmed at the cemetery. Notable recent films include Dirty Deeds. It was also pictured in the Bollywood Blockbuster Dil Chahta Hai in a musical sequence.

The cemetery has been a place of inspiration for many artists, Henry Lawson who ultimately ended up there was fond of using the location in his stories, either as direct reference or indirectly.

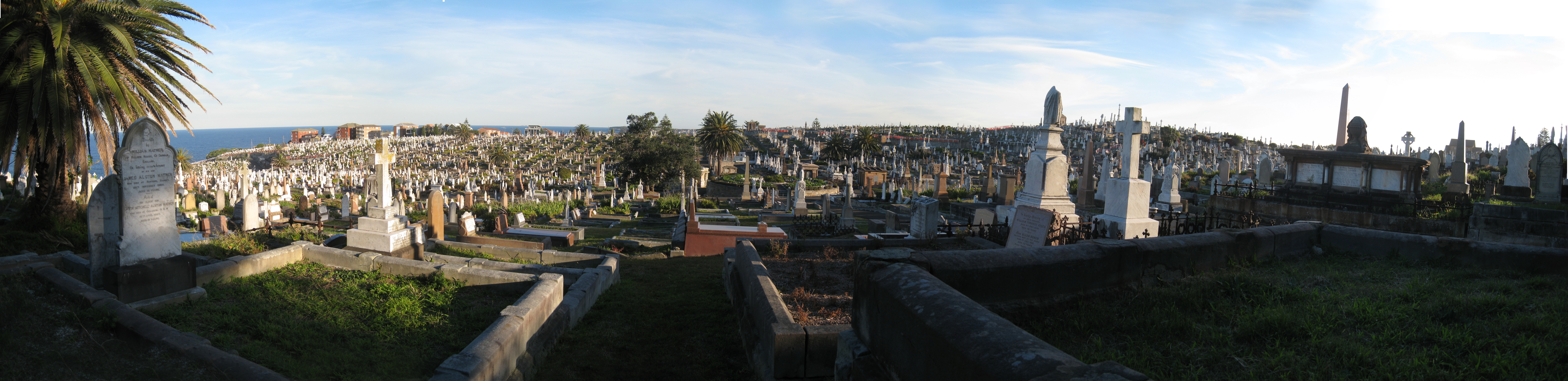
A panorama of the cemetery.

== South Head Cemetery ==
South Head Cemetery is situated at the junction of New South Head Road and Old South Head Road, Vaucluse. It is administered by Waverley Council and is a companion cemetery to Waverley Cemetery.

The cemetery was established to cater for the needs of the population in the growing Vaucluse area; its first interment was in 1868. It was run for some time by a private trust, but management was transferred to Waverley Council in 1941. It covers an expanse of 4 acres (16,000 m^{2}) and contains the graves of 6,000 people as of 2008. South Head General Cemetery contains the graves of many notable people, including: Australia's first Prime Minister, Edmund Barton (1920); NSW Governors Sir Walter Davidson (1923) and Sir Roden Cutler VC (2002); NSW Premiers Sir John Robertson (1891), Sir William Lyne (1913), Sir Charles Wade (1922) and Sir Joseph Carruthers (1932); Queensland Premier and Federal Treasurer "Red Ted" Theodore (1950); members of the Packer, Fairfax and Norton newspaper dynasties; members of the Street family legal dynasty including two Chief Justices, Sir Philip Whistler Street (1938) and Sir Kenneth Whistler Street (1972); Anglican Archbishop of Sydney John Charles Wright (1933); the Foy retailing family (including a monument to the disappeared Foy heiress Juanita Nielsen); architects Mortimer Lewis (1879), Thomas Rowe (1899), John Horbury Hunt (1904), Robin Dods (1920), Howard Joseland (1930), John Burcham Clamp (1931) and Neville Gruzman (2005); artist George Washington Lambert (1930); writers Jack Moses (1945) and Frank Clune (1971); entertainer Gladys Moncrieff (1976) and founder of the acting dynasty Roy Redgrave (1922); cricketer Warwick Armstrong; and Edmund Resch junior of the Resch's brewing family (1963).

The cemetery contains the graves of 22 of the 40 victims of the 1927 Greycliffe ferry disaster. There are also Commonwealth war graves of 18 Australian service personnel, 5 of World War I and 13 of World War II, in various parts of the cemetery.

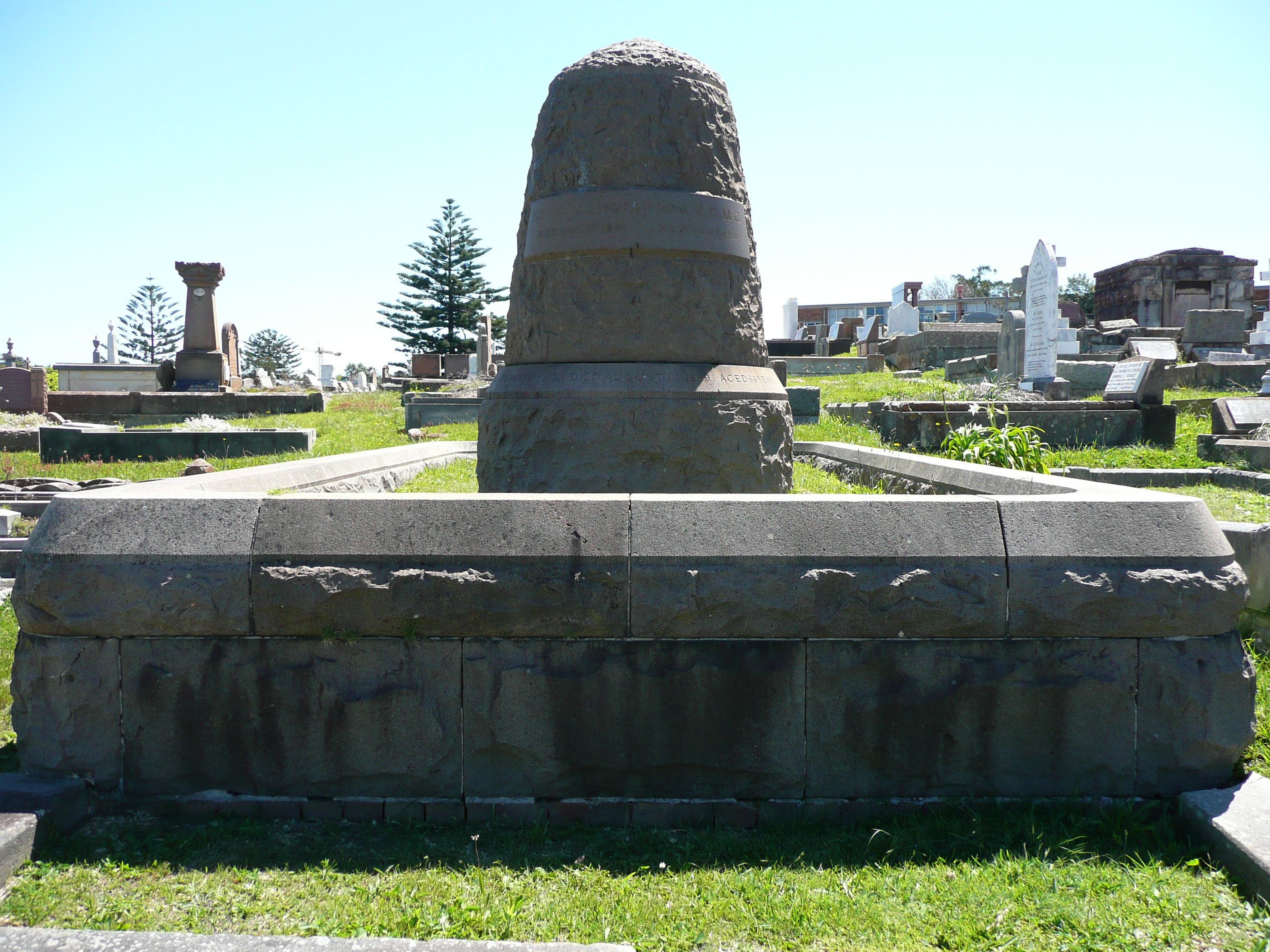
Grave of Sir John Robertson

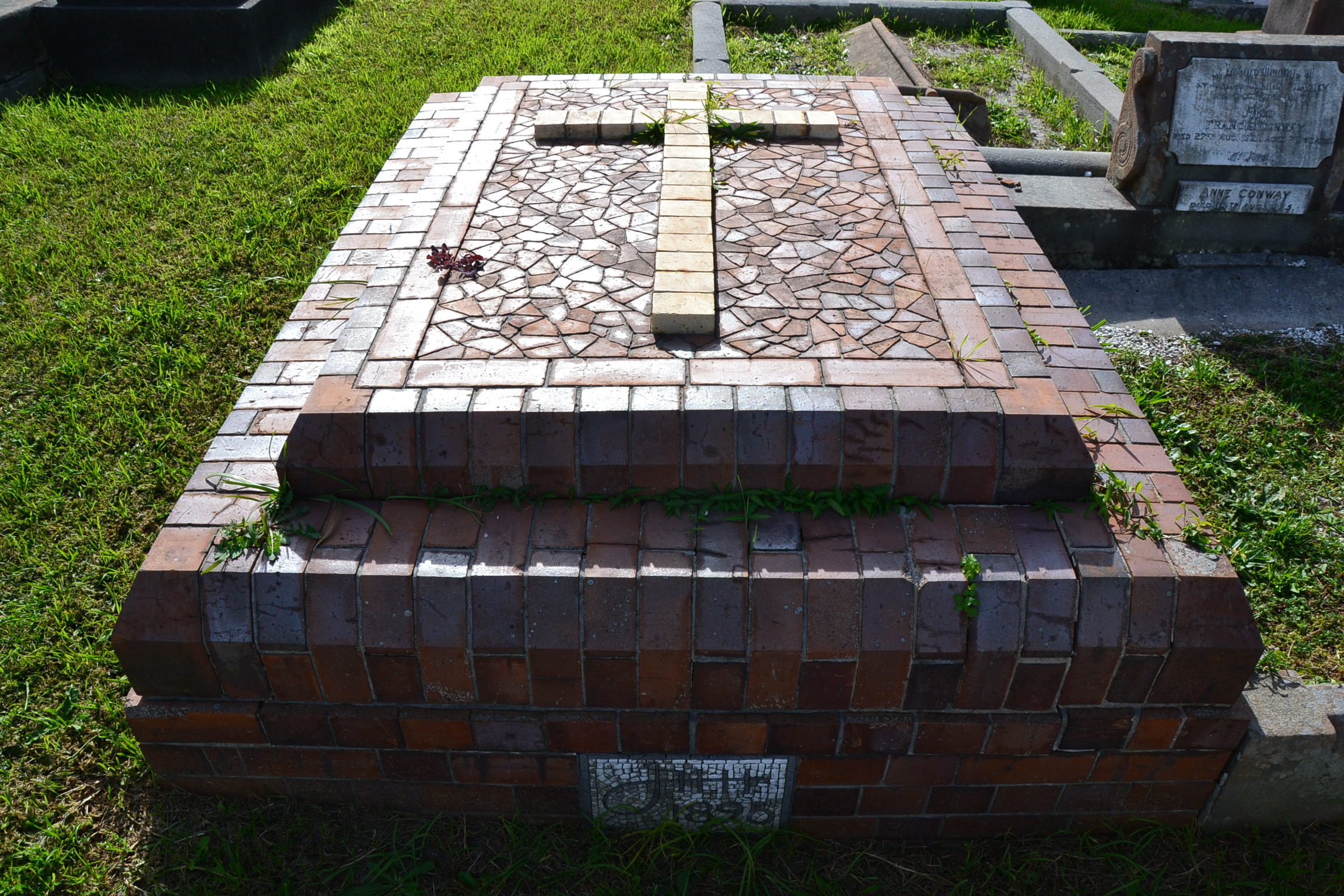
Grave of John Horbury Hunt

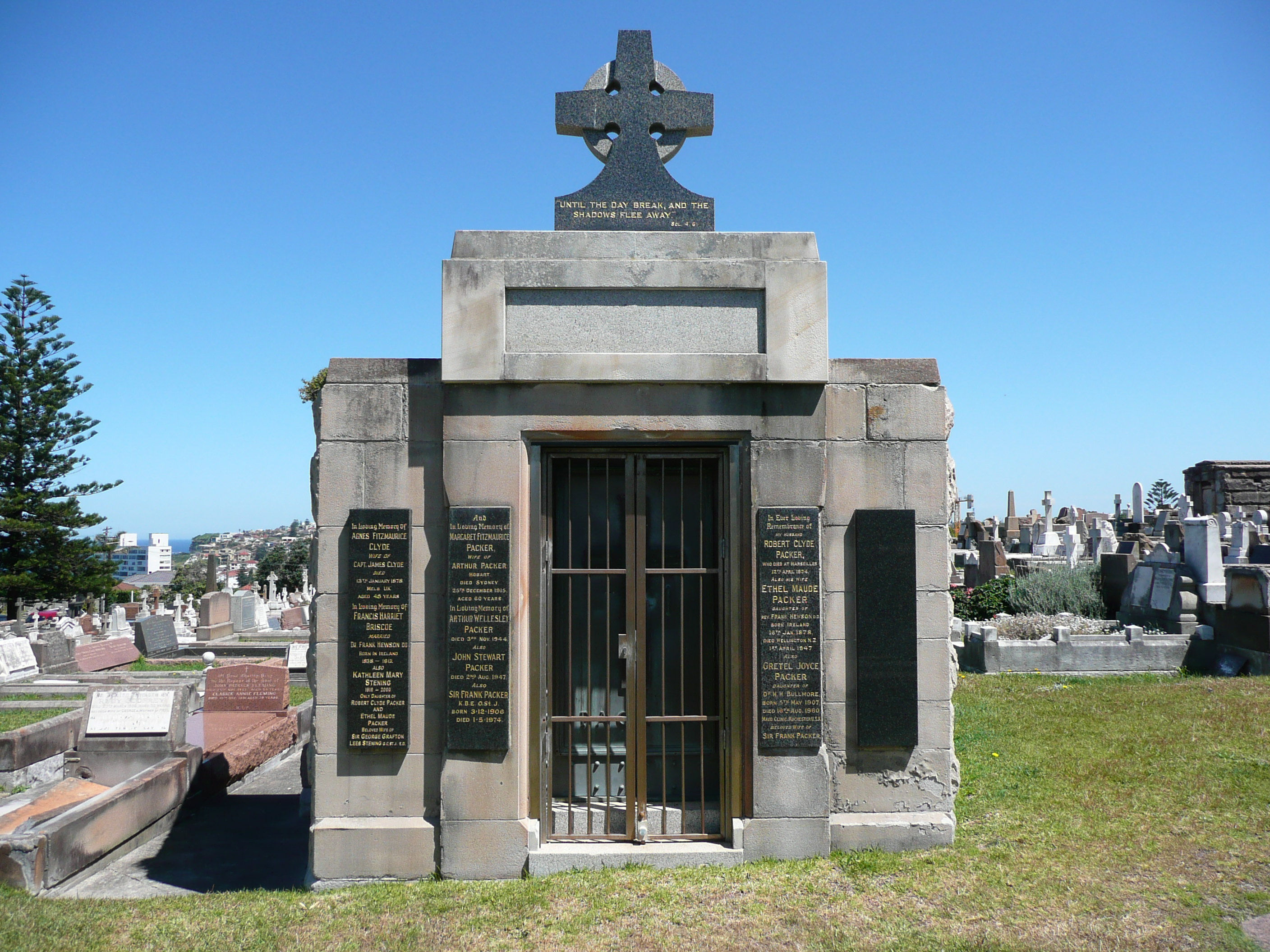
Packer family mausoleum

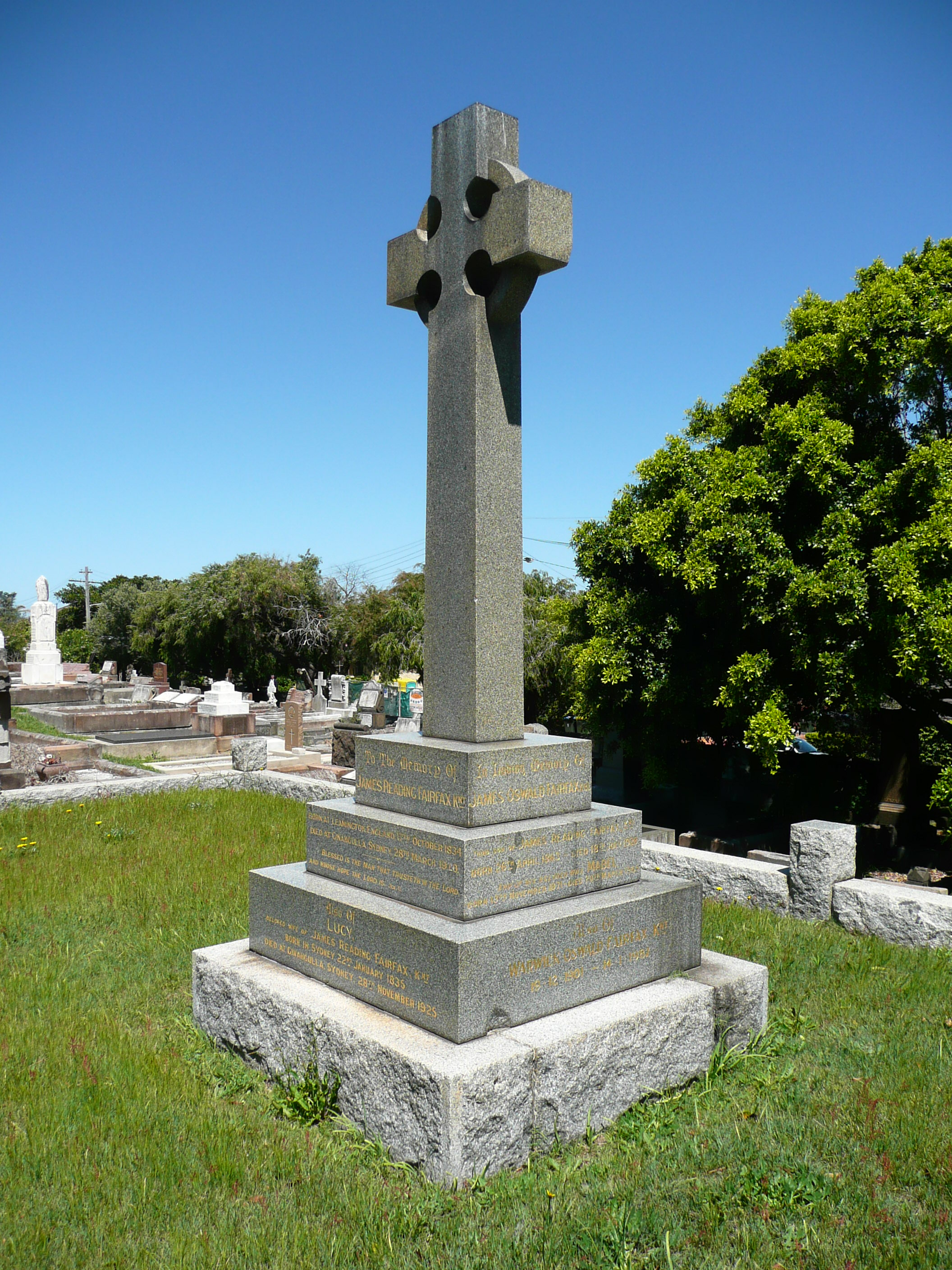
Fairfax family plot

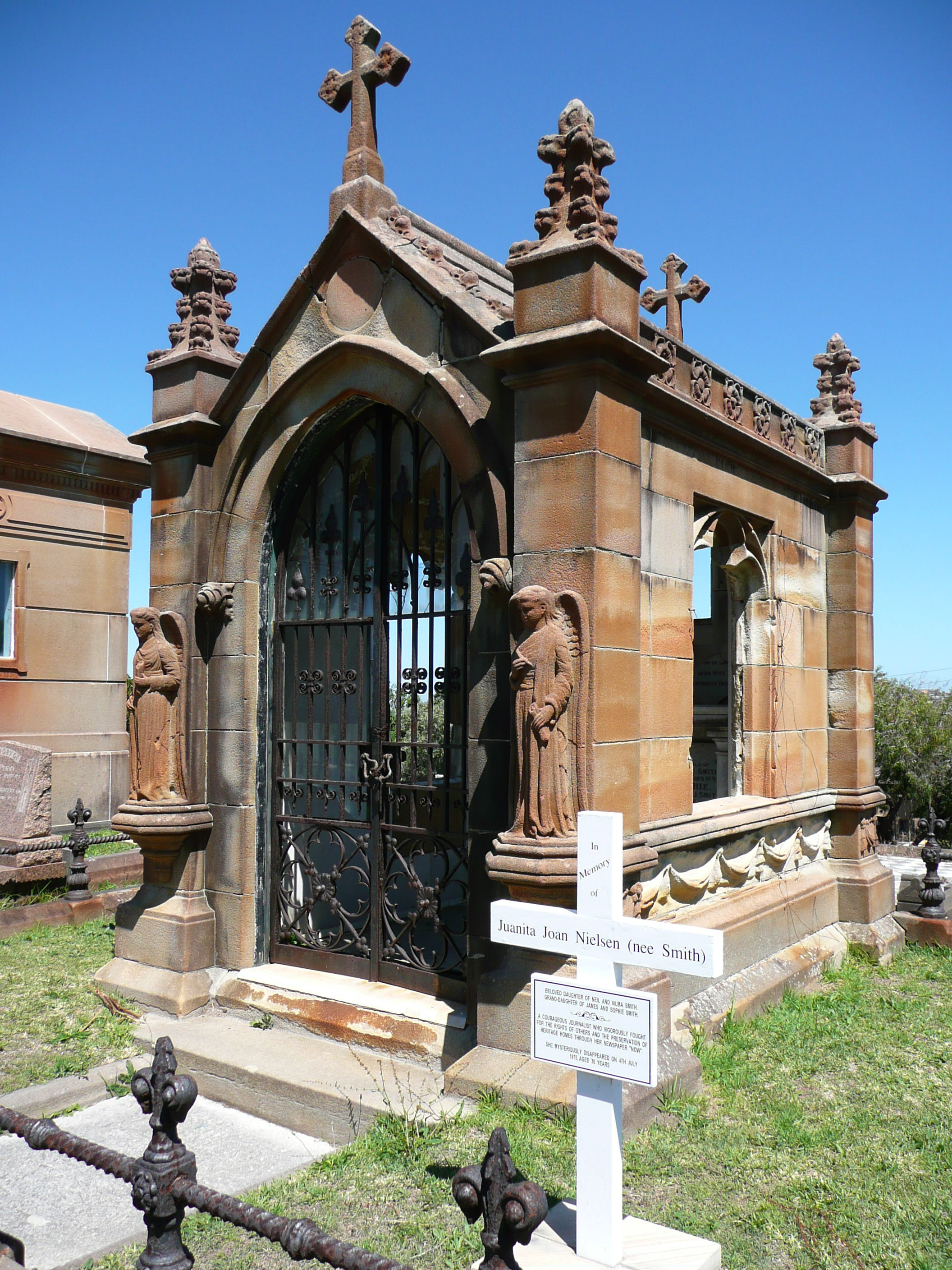
Memorial of Juanita Nielsen, Mark Foy family mausoleum

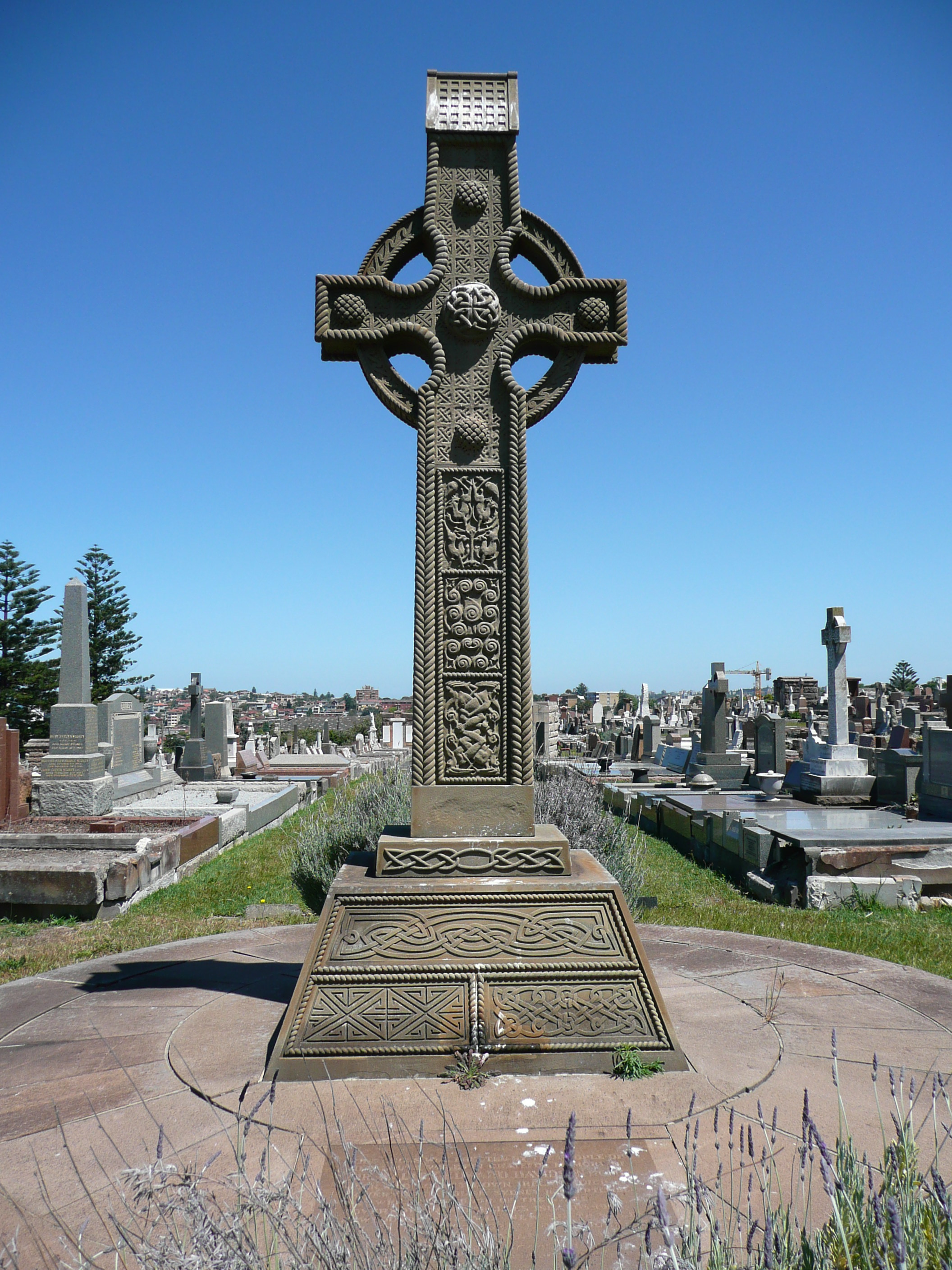
Grave of Sir Walter Edward Davidson

Grave of Sir Edmund and Lady Barton

Grave of Sir Roden and Lady Cutler

Grave of Sir Philip and Sir Kenneth Street

== See also ==
- South Head General Cemetery
- Burials at Waverley Cemetery
