= Most Holy Trinity Church, Detroit =

Most Holy Trinity Church
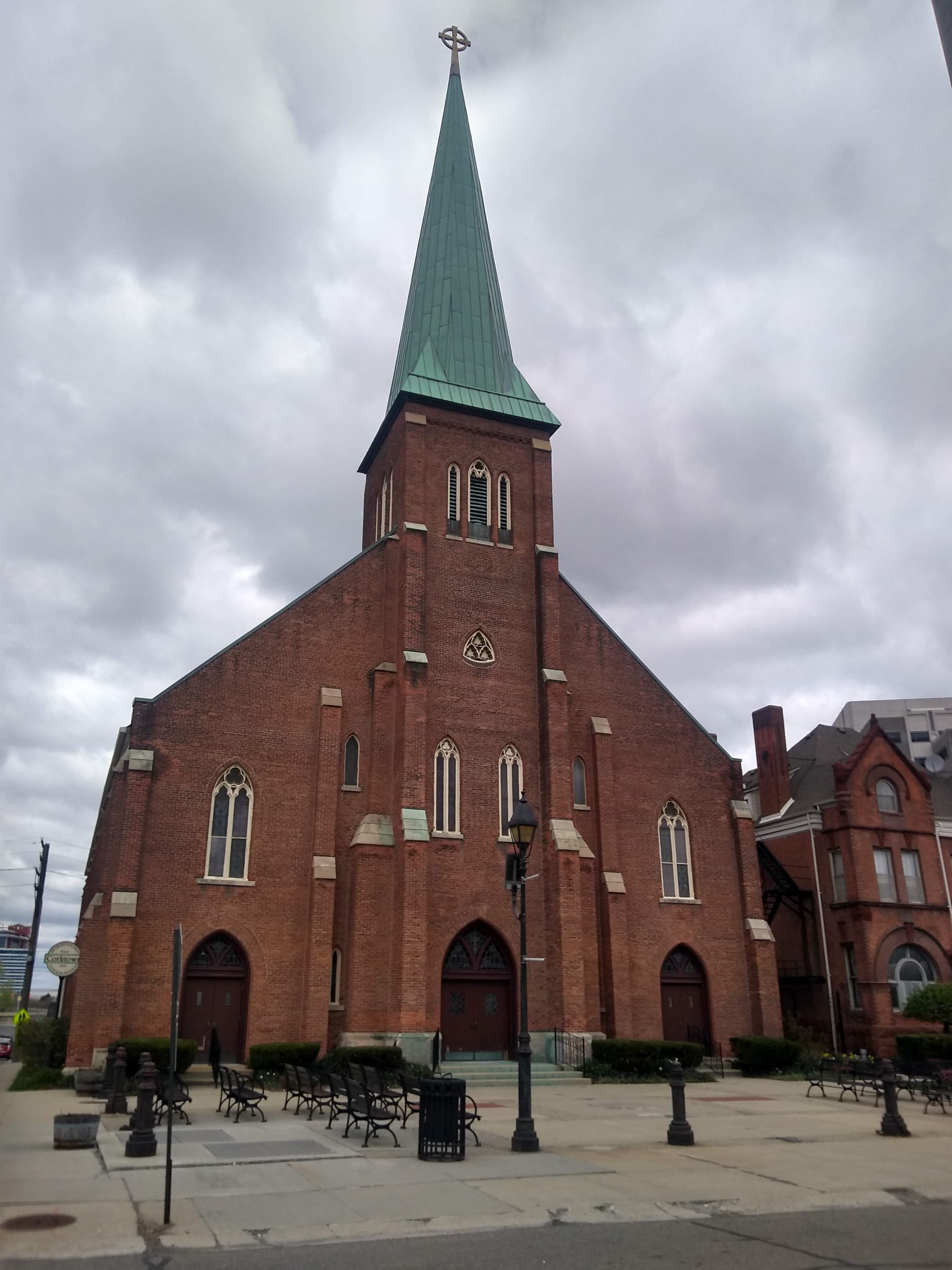
- Exterior of the church
- Most Holy Trinity Church
- Location: Detroit, Michigan
- Country: United States
- Language: English
- Denomination: Roman Catholic church
- Website: mhtdetroit.org

History
- Status: Parish church
- Founder: Frederick Rese
- Dedicated: June 14, 1835

Architecture
- Architect: Patrick Keely
- Style: Gothic Revival
- Years built: 1855-1866

Administration
- Archdiocese: Detroit
- Parish: Most Holy Trinity Parish

Most Holy Trinity Church is a historic Roman Catholic church located within the Detroit neighborhood of Corktown. It is home to an active parish in the Archdiocese of Detroit. Construction of the church began in 1855, and finished in 1866. It is the second oldest Catholic Church in Detroit, and the first constructed to serve an English-speaking congregation. Standing at 170 feet tall, it was the tallest building in Michigan until the completion of the old Detroit City Hall in 1871. It mainly served an immigrant Irish-American population in its early years. It became a significant cultural center for the Irish, and later Mexican, Maltese, and Mohawk residents of Detroit.

== History ==
The Most Holy Trinity Parish was founded in 1834, when Reverend Frederick Rese purchased a building in central Detroit, formerly home to the First Protestant Society Church. The building was transformed into a hospital during the 1826–1837 cholera pandemic, as Detroit lacked a proper hospital. In 1849, the original building was deconstructed and rebuilt in its current location. The current building was designed by Patrick Keely, an Irish-American architect from Brooklyn. The church was initially built on a limited budget, and the parish often held fundraisers to cover costs. Upon its completion in 1866, it was the tallest building in Michigan, a title it retained until the completion of the old Detroit City Hall in 1871. The church is home to the oldest still-in-use pipe organ in Michigan.

Detroit’s first public display of electric light is reported to have occurred at Most Holy Trinity Church in 1875. Fr. Aloysius Bleyenburg, an early developer and inventor in the field of electric lighting, displayed an arc lamp over the altar during Christmas morning Mass.

On July 22, 1880, the steamboat Mamie, on a trip to Monroe led by the church's Reverend, collided with another steamboat, the Garland, in the Detroit River. Of the 23 passengers, 15, including 12 young altar boys, drowned. The collision was declared "the direst calamity Detroit has known in years" by the Detroit Free Press.

The church was remodeled in 1905 as a celebration of its 50th anniversary, which included the introduction of electrical wiring. Through the 1940s and 1950s, the parish struggled with severe debt, resulting in parts of the church becoming worn down. In 1985, a fire destroyed parts of the building. After repairs completed, Pastor Jay Samonie rededicated the church. It was redecorated and restored in 2008. The church celebrated its 175th anniversary in 2010. In 2020, the church announced the opening of a new community center, funded by a parish family.

== Culture ==
The church has acted as a cultural center for Irish immigrants to Detroit, holding religious and cultural events, including Saint Patrick's Day celebrations. Later, it expanded to become a cultural center for Mexican and Maltese Catholic immigrants. It has been an advocate for the rights of immigrants in Detroit and nationally.

The church has provided space to the Indians of North America Foundation (INAF). INAF provided educational and social resources to Corktown's Mohawk population, which was primarily made up of ironworkers and their families.

The area around the church, including the church itself, was designated a historic district by the City of Detroit's Historic Designation Advisory Board in 1984.
