= Little Caughnawaga =

Brooklyn, New York neighborhood with a large Mohawk population

Little Caughnawaga is a historical neighborhood in Brooklyn, New York, U.S., with a large population of Kahnawake Mohawks, as well as those from Akwesasne and other Haudenosaunee peoples, many of whom were members of the Brooklyn Local 361 Ironworkers’ Union who were known as the Mohawk skywalkers and their families. During the mid-20th century, an area of ten square blocks north of the Gowanus Canal contained the largest Mohawk settlement beyond the borders of Canada. The neighborhood is now called Boerum Hill or North Gowanus. In the 1950s there were as many as 700 Mohawk people living in Little Caughnawaga.

In the 1920s Indigenous people from Kahnawake began moving into this section of Brooklyn. This was during a time when New York City was transforming and skyscrapers and bridges were being built. A community gathering place for these ironworkers included the Doray Tavern, informally known as the Wigwam (now called Hank's Bar or Saloon). It was located on Nevins Street between State Street and Atlantic Avenue. An alternative name for the neighborhood was Downtown Caughnawaga.

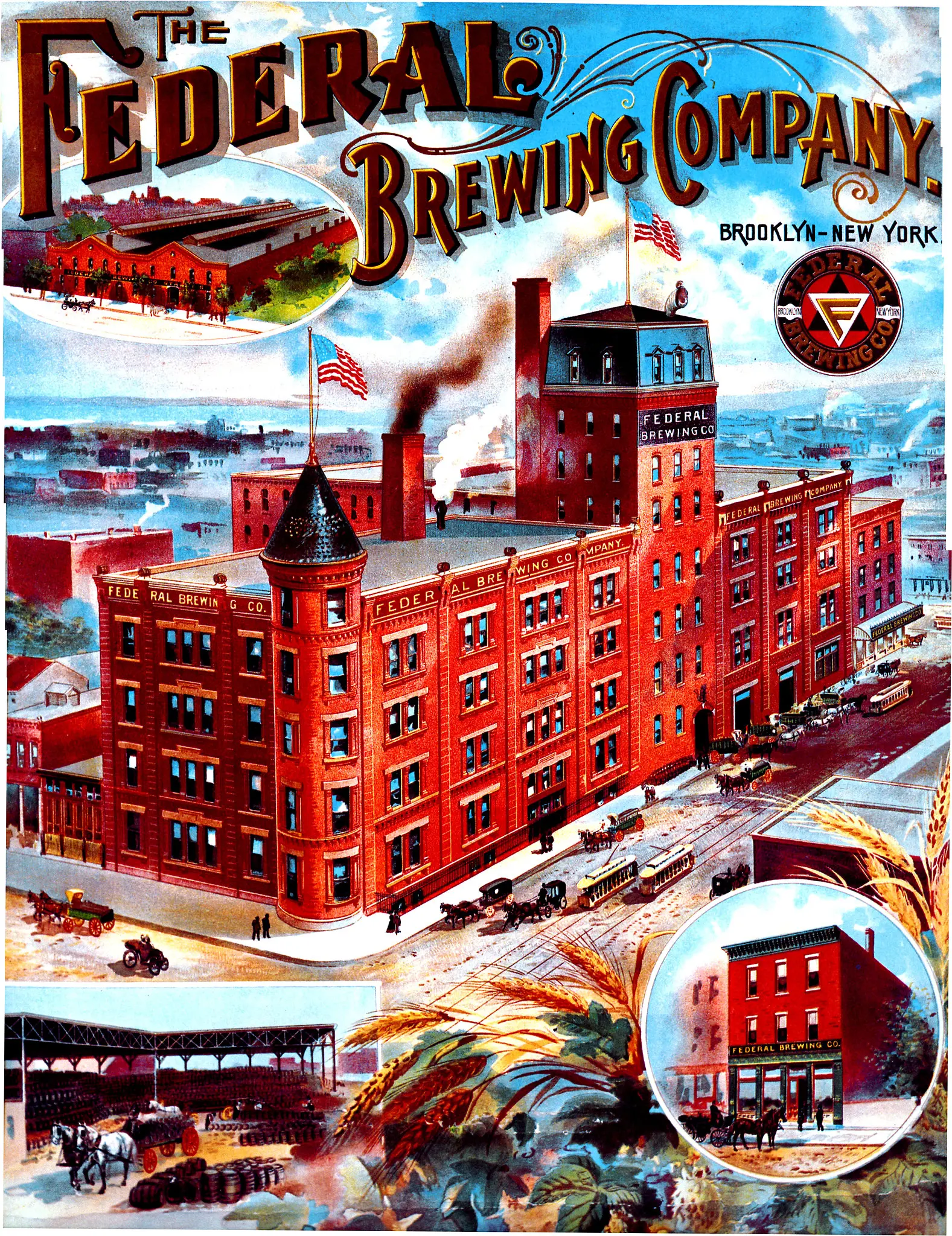
Federal Brewing Company building (later the Fred Goat Metal Stamping Company building where many Mohawks worked), Little Caughnawaga, 1905

The reason why Mohawks moved to the area is because the Brooklyn Local 361 of the Bridge, Structural and Ornamental Ironworker’s Union was located nearby on Atlantic Avenue between Third and Fourth avenues. While the men worked as ironworkers, the Mohawk women of Little Caughnawaga had jobs as housekeepers as well as holding positions at local factories, for example, the Fred Goat Company metal-stamping plant (formerly the Federal Brewing Company building) at the corner of Third Avenue and Dean Street.

Some of the community members would attend the Cuyler Presbyterian Church, which was located at Pacific Street between Hoyt and Bond. During the 1940s and early 1950s, the pastor, David M. Cory (who was non-Indigenous) gave his sermons in the Mohawk language.

== In the media ==
In 2005, a film was made by Reaghan Tarbell, titled Little Caughnawaga, about the neighborhood and the Indigenous people of Canada who lived there. Tarbell expanded upon the topic in her 2008 film, To Brooklyn and Back: A Mohawk Journey.

In 2021, Building Brooklyn: Like Coming Home Season 4, Episode 1 was produced that featured the stories of the women of Little Caughnawaga who helped establish the neighborhood community.
