= Sargeant, Minnesota =

City in Minnesota, United States

- City
- Location in Mower County and the state of Minnesota
- Coordinates: 43°48′22″N 92°48′01″W
- Country: United States
- State: Minnesota
- County: Mower

Area
  - Total: 0.80 sq mi (2.1 km^{2})
  - Land: 0.80 sq mi (2.1 km^{2})
  - Water: 0.00 sq mi (0 km^{2})
- Elevation: 1,394 ft (425 m)

Population (2020)
  - Total: 63
  - Density: 78.95/sq mi (30.48/km^{2})
- Time zone: UTC-6 (Central (CST))
  - Summer (DST): UTC-5 (CDT)
- ZIP code: 55973
- Area code: 507
- FIPS code: 27-58576
- GNIS feature ID: 2396537

Sargeant is a city in Mower County, Minnesota, United States. The population was 63 at the 2020 census.

== History ==
Sargeant was platted in 1894, after the railroad had been extended to that point.

== Geography ==
Sargeant is in northern Mower County. It is bordered by Sargeant Township to the north, east, and south, and by Waltham Township to the west. It is 10 miles (16 km) by road northwest of Dexter and 19 miles (31 km) northeast of Austin, the county seat.

According to the U.S. Census Bureau, Sargeant has a total area of 0.80 square miles (2.07 km^{2}), all land. It sits on a low ridge that drains west to Roberts Creek, a tributary of the Cedar River, and east to the North Branch of the Root River, which flows east to the Mississippi River.

== Demographics ==
Historical population
| Census | Pop. | Note | %± |
|---|---|---|---|
| 1910 | 76 | | — |
| 1920 | 79 | | 3.9% |
| 1930 | 91 | | 15.2% |
| 1940 | 138 | | 51.6% |
| 1950 | 121 | | −12.3% |
| 1960 | 113 | | −6.6% |
| 1970 | 85 | | −24.8% |
| 1980 | 95 | | 11.8% |
| 1990 | 78 | | −17.9% |
| 2000 | 76 | | −2.6% |
| 2010 | 61 | | −19.7% |
| 2020 | 63 | | 3.3% |
U.S. Decennial Census

=== 2010 census ===
As of the census of 2010, there were 61 people, 30 households, and 16 families living in the city. The population density was 73.5 inhabitants per square mile (28.4/km^{2}). There were 32 housing units at an average density of 38.6 per square mile (14.9/km^{2}). The racial makeup of the city was 96.7% White, 1.6% Asian, and 1.6% from two or more races.

There were 30 households, of which 20.0% had children under the age of 18 living with them, 43.3% were married couples living together, 6.7% had a female householder with no husband present, 3.3% had a male householder with no wife present, and 46.7% were non-families. 40.0% of all households were made up of individuals, and 16.7% had someone living alone who was 65 years of age or older. The average household size was 2.03 and the average family size was 2.56.

The median age in the city was 45.5 years. 18% of residents were under the age of 18; 4.9% were between the ages of 18 and 24; 26.3% were from 25 to 44; 31.2% were from 45 to 64; and 19.7% were 65 years of age or older. The gender makeup of the city was 50.8% male and 49.2% female.

=== 2000 census ===
As of the census of 2000, there were 76 people, 29 households, and 20 families living in the city. The population density was 91.1 inhabitants per square mile (35.2/km^{2}). There were 33 housing units at an average density of 39.6 per square mile (15.3/km^{2}). The racial makeup of the city was 98.68% White, and 1.32% from two or more races.

There were 29 households, out of which 44.8% had children under the age of 18 living with them, 51.7% were married couples living together, 10.3% had a female householder with no husband present, and 31.0% were non-families. 24.1% of all households were made up of individuals, and 13.8% had someone living alone who was 65 years of age or older. The average household size was 2.62 and the average family size was 3.00.

In the city, the population was spread out, with 32.9% under the age of 18, 5.3% from 18 to 24, 30.3% from 25 to 44, 14.5% from 45 to 64, and 17.1% who were 65 years of age or older. The median age was 36 years. For every 100 females, there were 85.4 males. For every 100 females age 18 and over, there were 88.9 males.

The median income for a household in the city was $38,333, and the median income for a family was $38,333. Males had a median income of $27,000 versus $12,188 for females. The per capita income for the city was $14,485. There were 7.1% of families and 15.4% of the population living below the poverty line, including 16.0% of under eighteens and none of those over 64.
