= George Sargent (businessman) =

Australian businessman

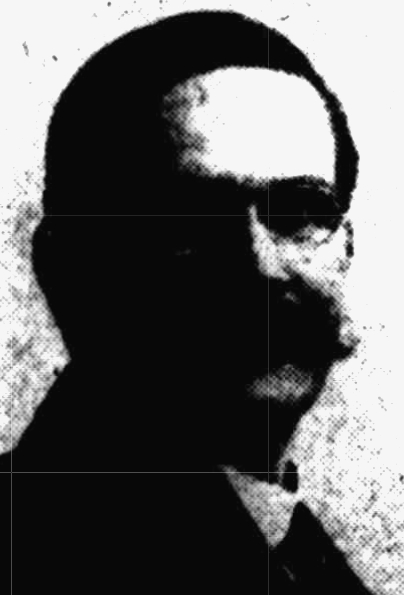
George Sargent c.1921

George Sargent (1859–1921) was an Australian businessman. George and his wife Charlotte Sargent (née Foster) (1856–1924) were both pastry cooks and caterers. Together with their son, Foster Sargent (1878–1924), also known as Hartley Sargent, they founded the company that made Sargent's meat pies in 1906.

== Life, family, and career ==
George was one of five sons of James Sergeant, a Warwickshire grocer, all of whom migrated to Australia. He trained as a baker and, after migrating, he worked in a bakery in George Street, Sydney, where he became foreman. In 1883, he married Australian-born Charlotte ('Lottie') Foster, who was managing a confectionery shop on George St. She already had a son, Henry Hartley Foster—known as Hartley, and later as Foster Henry Hartley Sargent—whom George Sargent adopted as his own. They also adopted a daughter, Dorothy May.

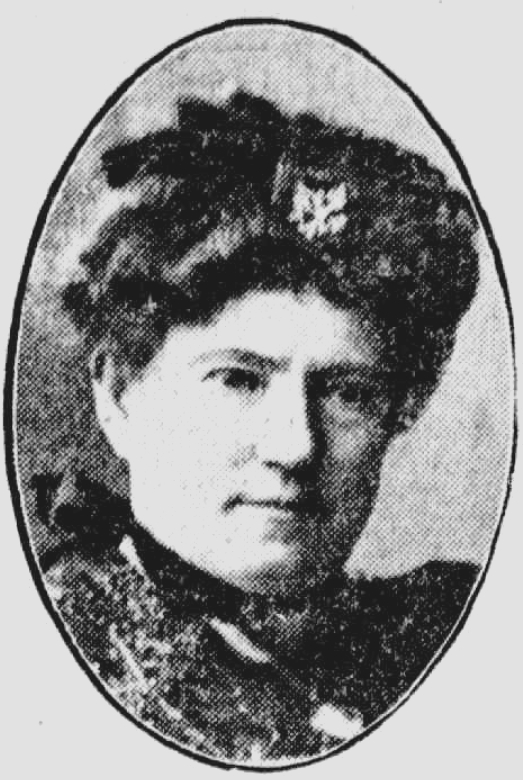
Charlotte Sargent c.1915

In 1886 and 1887 George Sargent was operating a bakery in Glebe. He then moved to a bakery in Surry Hills, (one source says in Surrey Street, Darlinghurst), using the proceeds of a sweepstakes win by his wife Charlotte to fund the new premises. After winning a contract to supply bread to a tea house chain, the strain to meet the demand badly affected George Sargent's health. The bakery business was sold for a good profit, to allow time for George Sargent to recuperate. Deciding that it was time to reenter business, Charlotte prevailed on a man to put in a bid on her behalf for bakery equipment and then found an empty shop to house it. When almost broke, the couple opened the ‘Little Palace’ at 390 Oxford Street, Paddington (opposite the fire station); it soon became a popular landmark.

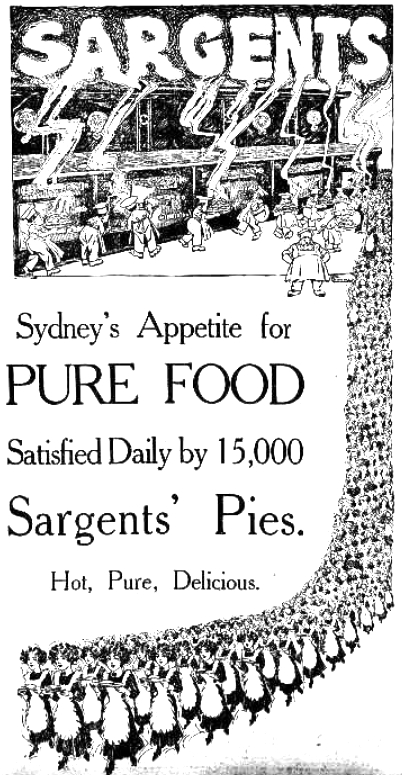
Advertisement, 1914.

They started selling pies for a penny at their Paddington shop, in 1891, which became an immediate success. The Sargents moved the business to 11 Hunter Street, Sydney, in 1895, where it continued to prosper, but sold it to W.E. Dance in 1900. They then travelled overseas for a time. In 1901, their son, opened two bakeries in Pitt Street and a refreshment room in George Street. Upon their return, George and Charlotte Sargent effectively resumed their family businesses from these premises, but prudently traded under the name 'F. H. Sargent'. They were sued by Dance, but in the resulting settlement kept their right to trade in the city.

By 1905, they were sending deliveries of fresh cakes and pastries by rail to destinations in the country. In 1906, a private company was set up, with all three Sargents as general managers, and George and Hartley, as directors. In 1909, a public company, Sargent’s Ltd, was registered, with an authorised capital of £80,000. The Sargent family received 50,000 fully-paid £1 shares and £10,000 in cash—£45,000 of £80,000 total capital was attributed to goodwill— and George and Charlotte Sargent remained as managers. George Sargent even involved himself in purchases and inspections of virtually all the ingredients that the organisation used, so careful was he of Sargent's reputation for high-quality.

By 1913, Sargents were producing 125,000 meat pies per week at their factory in Burton Street, Darlinghurst and, by 1915, were operating 36 refreshment rooms and shops. The company opened a refreshment room in Melbourne, in 1909. The company made, meat pies, fruit pies, pastries, and even wedding cakes.

Their son, Foster Sargent, although newly-widowed with five children and a wealthy man already in his mid thirties, enlisted to fight in World War I, in 1915. He attended the Officer Training School at Liverpool Camp, but he embarked for overseas service, on 16 February 1916, as a common soldier, just days after the notorious Liverpool mutiny. He was strongly in favour of conscription, and his enlistment was intended to encourage men to volunteer. He also presented the army with a motor ambulance.

Charlotte became heavily involved in activities to raise funds for the war, and she organised functions for soldiers' wives, and their widows and children, and assisted returned soldiers, as well as caring for her son's five children. Corporal Foster Sargent was wounded, in 1916, and later became a prisoner of war at Pozieres; he was subsequently held at in Germany, at Hameln and Minden. He was released to internment in the Netherlands, in June 1918, before the war ended. Foster Sargent returned home, with his health permanently damaged by his war service, after spending time at a hospital in England. He succeeded George, as chairman of the company in 1919, but George remained in charge of operations.

In 1919, a boarding house keeper named Mary Mahony sought damages of £400 against Sargents, having claimed that she had been served a pie containing portions of a rodent. Mahony was awarded £25, but later evidence emerged of a conspiracy. At the subsequent retrial, the reputation of Sargent's pies was vindicated by the jury's verdict.

In the years before 1921, the company performed outstandingly well, and regularly paid a 10% dividend to its shareholders. The Sargent family, as majority shareholders, became very wealthy.

George and Charlotte, from 1895, lived in the suburb of Beecroft, and developed housing on land in the area. Their son and his family also lived at Beecroft, until 1909, when he moved to Melbourne to manage the new operations there. From 1912, George and Charlotte lived in a large house, named 'Hartley Hope', in the suburb of Vaucluse. From 1911, after he returned from Melbourne, their son and his family lived nearby, in a house named 'St. Emllion'.

== Death and aftermath ==
George Sargent died at home, aged 62, 13 August 1921, after leaving the office somewhat earlier than usual on the previous evening. He was buried at Waverley Cemetery.

Charlotte took George Sargent's place on the board of the company, but the absence of George Sargent's meticulous operational management began to be reflected in a much poorer financial performance, by early 1924. 1923 was described as being "a wretched year" for the company. A committee of five businessmen, who were also shareholders, was set up to inquire into its affairs, in February 1924. The business troubles were seen by some to have hastened Charlotte's death, which occurred on 15 May 1924, and to have further affected the already poor health of her son, Foster.

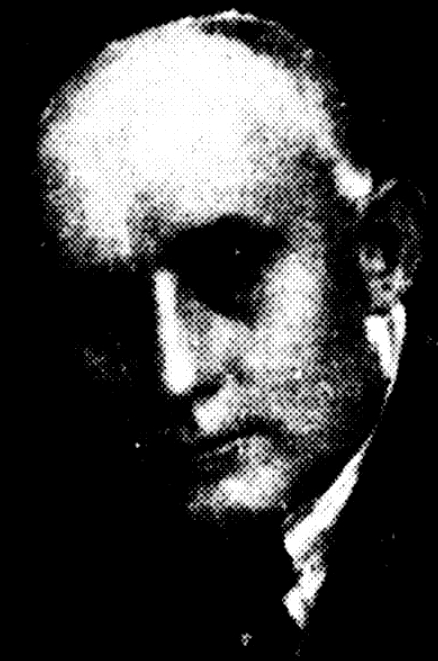
Foster Henry Hartley Sargent, around the year of his death.

The disagreements between the directors of the company became even more pronounced, after Charlotte's death. In July 1924, Charles Bridges took over as General Manager. Foster had apparently been offered and declined the position of General Manager, but in August 1924 the board had appointed him as General Manager of the factory, at a salary of £1,000 per year. The opposing faction on the board saw this new role as unnecessary, and the board motion appointing him to it was later rescinded. Foster Sargent may have retained only minority support on the board, by the end of August 1924, when the committee's report was released and he stood down temporarily as Chairman, to recuperate.

The family connection with the company ended, in 1924, the year that both Charlotte Sargent and her son died. Foster Sargent, died only months after his mother. He died after falling from a cliff, at Medlow Bath, on 24 September 1924, not long before he was expecting to return to work. Evidence was given, by his wife, at a coronial inquiry, that he did not have work-related worries, was in good spirits, and was looking forward to this return to work, but that was not consistent with the very troubled circumstances of Sargents Limited at the time. His death was determined to be an accidental death, but possibly was suicide. He was survived by his widow, Mary Evelyn (nee Proud), known as Evelyn, who was the sister-in-law of R.W. Winning, and Frank, Ivor, Geoffrey, Nancy, and Elizabeth (known as 'Betty'), the five children of his first marriage to Elaine Violet (nee Starkey), who died in 1914. His estate was valued at £54,654, and was bequeathed to his wife and his children, in equal shares. Evelyn lived until 1972. George and Charlotte, and Foster and his two wives lie in adjacent graves at Waverley Cemetery.

== Later events ==
In November 1924, shortly after the tragic death of the last founder of the company, Sargents started using a huge new gas-fired travelling oven, which was capable of producing 30,000 pies daily. In 1925, the company was once again highly profitable, paid a 10% dividend, and also paid a 5% bonus dividend to make up for the loss incurred in 1923.

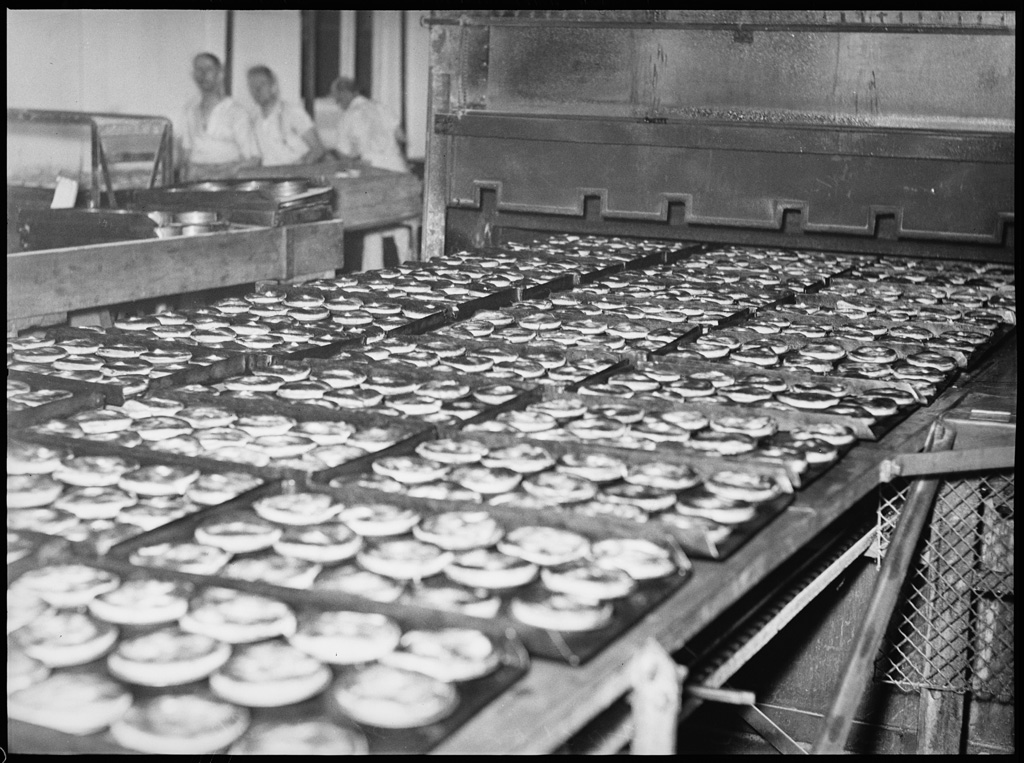
Sargents pie factory, 1938.

In 1927, over 10,000 left over Sargents pies—out of a total of 30,000 that had been supplied for the opening of the Old Parliament House in Canberra—needed to be buried because the size of the crowd had been overestimated.

In 1928, the Chairman and General Manager of Sargents Limited, Charles Bridges, who had been a Sydney council alderman until 1924, stepped down after being implicated in corruption associated with a contract for the Bunnerong Power Station. This setback apparently did not affect his longstanding appointment as a Labor member of the Legislative Council. By 1931, leading Sydney architect and city council alderman, E. Lindsay Thompson (1870–1935)—the architect of the Burton Street factory building and a member of the New Guard—became chairman of the company's board.

In July 1943, government wartime manpower controls affected the production of Sargents pies. With some pastrycooks away serving in the military forces, the remaining Sargents pastrycooks had been working up to 70 hours per week. After six months, the exhausted workers' trade union imposed an overtime ban, and the company ceased supplying meat pies to other than its own cafes. Dissatisfaction from affected retailers—threatening a deputation to the Prime Minister over the matter, if necessary—resulted in scarce manpower being allocated to restore supplies of meat pies.

In 1962, Sargent's were acquired by the Gillespie Brothers—it later merged to become Fielder Gillespie, and subsequently Goodman Fielder—and the Sargents brand continued. In 1962, the first of the remaining Sargent's refreshment rooms closed, with the last closing in 1964. Also in 1964, for the first time, the company did not supply fresh meat pies for the Royal Easter Show.

Four brands accounted for 90% of the Sydney wholesale meat pie market, in 1963, taken together some 60-million meat pies per annum. The largest was Gartrell White—using the 'Big Ben' brand name, and notable for their pies' square shape—based in Newtown. From 1948, Gartrell White was owned by George Weston Foods. The other three were Scott's, dating from 1882 and based in Redfern, Ireland's, based in Surry Hills, and Sargents. Sargent's were making around 10 million pies per annum, in 1963. Over time, Sergents, Scotts, and Irelands brands were consolidated under a single ownership structure.

In 1992, Sargents acquired the 'Big Ben' brand name from George Weston Foods. The company, by then known as Sargent's Pies Pty Ltd, was wound up in 1998.

After lying empty for a time, the factory in Burton Street, Darlinghurst—it occupied most of the block bounded by Burton, Palmer, Bourke, and Liverpool Streets—was demolished and replaced by apartments, by 1998. A new pie factory opened at Colyton, in the Western Suburbs of Sydney,

Frozen pies became a significant part of the market, and refrigerated transport allowed interstate bakers to capture a portion of the Sydney market. Other forms of fast food reduced the dominance of the meat pie in Australian fast food cuisine.

As late as 2012, Sargents still accounted for around half the market share for meat pies in Sydney. In December of that year, Sargents halted pie production, due to an industrial dispute over employee remuneration.

Production of frozen Sargent's pies resumed at Colyton, in its last years under the name Sargents Pty Ltd, but finally ceased in 2022. As the Colyton factory had also been making 'Big Ben' brand square pies, that pie also became unavailable in Australia from that time.
