= Edward Sargent (architect) =

American architect

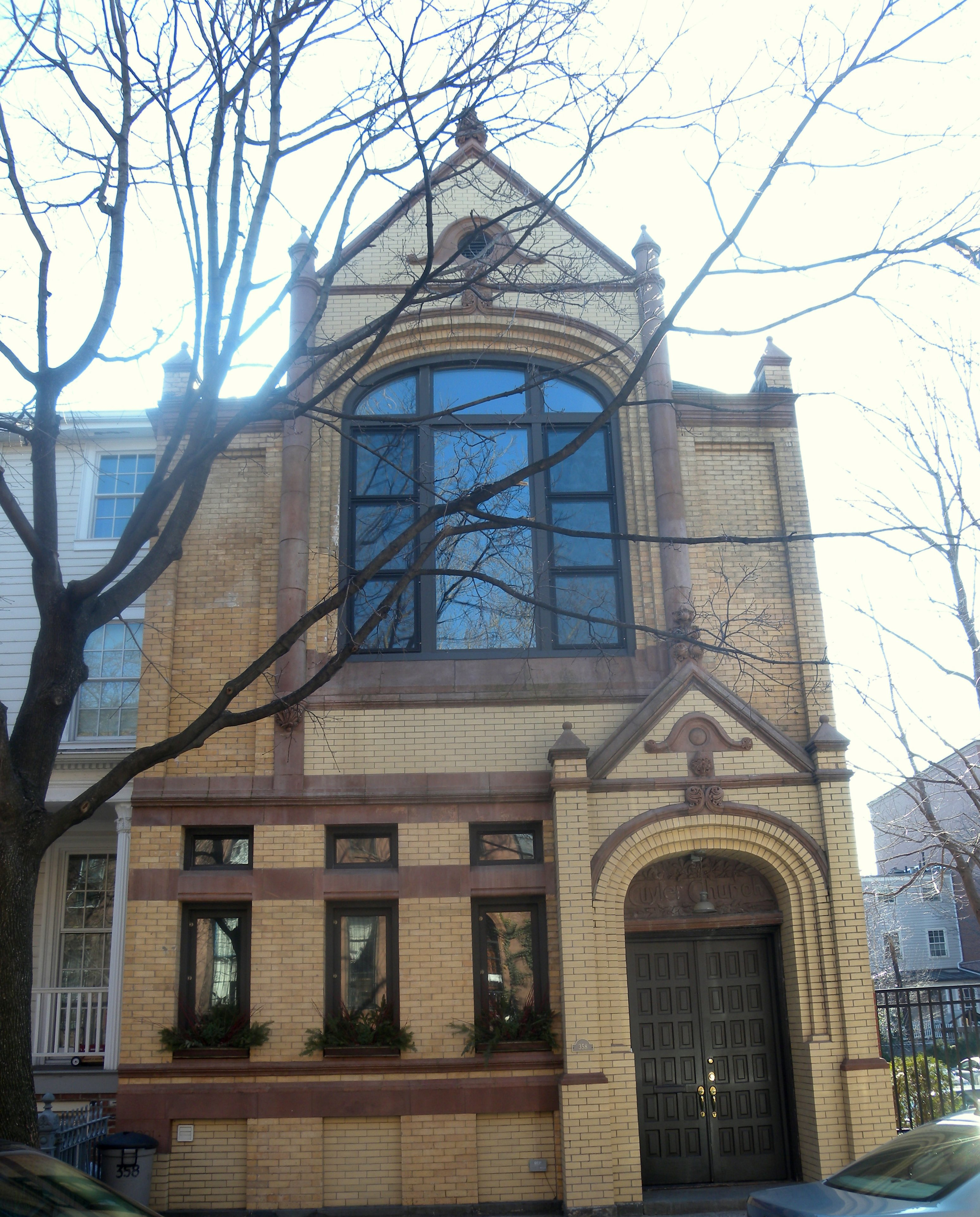
Former Cuyler Presbyterian Church, February 2011

Edward A. Sargent (November 1, 1842 – February 25, 1914) was an English-born American architect, known for his work on New York City schools, churches, office buildings, clubs, armory and country homes.

== Life and career ==
Sargent was born Ebenezer Alfred Sargent on November 1, 1842, in Hastings, England. He later changed his first name to Edward. Emigrating to New York City in 1867, he attended Cooper Union College.

Sargent married Mary Augusta Doubleday (daughter of Thomas D. Doubleday and niece of Abner Doubleday); together they had four daughters and one son. One daughter, Alice Sargent Johnson, became an illustrator. His brother was Daniel Wycliffe Sargent, an explorer in Africa.

His first work was as a watercolor artist. He worked as a delineator (illustrator) for Frederick Law Olmsted in the designs for Central Park and again as delineator worked on the Corn Exchange Building and the Protestant Welfare Building on Park Avenue. He made the plans for the 9th Regiment Armory, constructed the country home Lindenhurst for John Wanamaker at Cheltenham, Pennsylvania. In addition, he was the architect of public schools and private houses, including over 300 homes on Staten Island.

Sargent also worked for George Post (who built the first building to have an elevator).

== Works ==
Sargent designed the stone masonry pillars and wing walls of the entryways to the planned community of Rochelle Park in New Rochelle, New York in 1885. He designed large and medium-sized residences in the metropolitan New York area, notably in the St. George/New Brighton historic district of Staten Island.

Sargent has been credited with designing the Vanderzee-Harper House (circa 1887) at Westervelt Avenue (St. George/New Brighton historic district), although documentation for this attribution is lacking. Among the many notable Sargent-designed homes in the St. George/New Brighton historic district is 103 St. Mark's Place, originally built by Sargent for banker Frederick A. Rodewald in 1890.

In 1892, the firm of E. A. Sargent & Co. were the architects of the original American Yacht Club clubhouse on Milton Point (destroyed by fire in 1951).

He designed the Cuyler Presbyterian Church (1892) in Brooklyn. In 1894, the firm of W.E. Cable and E.A. Sargent won a competition from among nineteen bids to design and build the 9th Regiment Armory on 14th Street Manhattan. Completed in 1896, the armory was razed in 1969. Sargent also designed the Romanesque-style Mother A.M.E. Zion Church (1903-1904) at 127 West 89th Street, Manhattan (razed in 1934).

== Sources ==
- Ossiali, Natacha. "Cuyler Presbyterian Church, featured during National American Indian Heritage Month, a National Register of Historic Places Feature". Archived from the original on 2011-10-20.
- Sargent, E. A., editor In aid of the building fund of Tompkins lodge no. 471 F. & A. M. at the German club rooms, Stapleton, Staten island .../Sargent, E. A., ed. Stapleton [N.Y.] Pub. by Tompkins lodge, 1895. 2 p.l., 3-32 p. illus. (incl. facsim.) 15 x 31 cm. Staten Island. Chamber of commerce. By-laws...adopted July 16, 1895. [1895] 1 v. cm.
- Architectural League of New York. (1887). "Year book of the Architectural League of New York, and catalogue of the third annual exhibition": 22.
- Elliott, Cecil D. (2003). The American Architect from the Colonial Era to the Present. McFarland. p. 114. ISBN 978-0-7864-1391-1.
- Lundrigan, Margaret (2004). Staten Island: Isle of the Bay. Arcadia. p. 115. ISBN 978-0-7385-2443-6.
- Dolkart, Andrew S.; New York City Landmarks Preservation Commission; Postal, Matthew A.; New York (N.Y.). Landmarks Preservation Commission (2004). Guide to New York City Landmarks. Wiley. pp. 337–340. ISBN 978-0-471-36900-4.
- Old York Road Historical Society (2001). Cheltenham Township by Old York Road Historical Society. Images of America. Arcadia Publishing. ISBN 978-0-7385-0863-4.
- NY Times August 19, 1903 AME Zion Church
- ""Mary Augusta Sargent" (obituary)". New York Times. 1912-05-27. p. 11.
- ""Sargent" (obituary)". New York Times. 1914-02-26. p. 9.*NY Times
