= Jane Alice Sargant =

- Born: 1789; Isle of Ely
- Died: 1869 (aged 79–80); Hackney
- Occupation: Writer, poet
- Family: Sir Harry Smith, 1st Baronet

Jane Alice Sargant (1789–1869) was a British writer who produced conservative and religious writing in a number of genres, including children's fiction, poetry, biographies, plays, conduct books, and political pamphlets.

Jane Alice Smith was born on 1789 in the Isle of Ely, the daughter of John Smith, a surgeon, and Eleanor Moore. Of her several siblings, she was closest to Sir Harry Smith, 1st Baronet, a British Army officer and Governor and High Commissioner for Southern Africa. She married Daniel Sargant in 1807. He died in 1826 and she became a school teacher in Hackney and prolific author to support herself. She died in Hackney in 1869.

Her collection Sonnets and Other Poems contains many pro-war poems. She wrote a number of books published by the Society for Promoting Christian Knowledge, whose stories didactically instruct children on their responsibilities. Her conservative political tracts include 1832's pro-slavery An Address to the Females of Great Britain and 1852's Remarks Occasioned by Strictures, which inveighed against American women for not doing more to end slavery.

== Bibliography ==
=== Poetry ===
- Sonnets and Other Poems Hatchard, 1817.
- Extracts from the pilgrimage of St. Caroline : with notes, by an Englishwoman W. Wright, 1821

=== Children's fiction ===
- The Broken Arm: A National School Story. 1 vol. London: S. P. C. K., 1847.
- The Brothers. 1 vol. London: S. P. C. K., 1848.
- Shades of Character: First Series. 1 vol. London: S. P. C. K., 1850.
- Ann Ash: or, The Foundling. 1 vol. London: J. H. and J. Parker, 1851.
- Let Well Alone. 1 vol. London: S. P. C. K., 1851.
- But Once. 1 vol. London: S. P. C. K., 1851.
- The Good Neighbours: A Tale of the Cholera in 1849. 1 vol. London: S. P. C. K., 1852.
- No Lie Thrives: A Tale. 1 vol. London: S. P. C. K., 1853.
- Home Tales, Founded on Fact. 1 vol. London: S. P. C. K., 1853.
- Charlie Burton: A Tale. 1 vol. London: S. P. C. K., 1856.
- Fireside Tales. 2 vol. London: S. P. C. K., 1857.

=== Fiction ===
- Ringstead Abbey: or, The Stranger's Grave; with Other Tales (1830)

=== Pamphlets ===
- An address to the Peers of England (1820)
- A Letter to the Queen (1820)
- An Address to the Females of Great Britain, on the Propriety of Their Petitioning Parliament for the Abolition of Negro Slavery (1833)
- Remarks Occasioned by Strictures in the Courier and New York Enquirer of December 1852 (1853)

=== Conduct books ===
- Letters from a Mother to her Daughter at or Going to School Pointing out the Duties Towards her Maker, her Governness, her Schoolfellows and Herself (1825)

=== Plays ===
- Joan of Arc (1840)
