= Sargant =

Sargant may refer to

- Edmund Beale Sargant (1855–1935), British colonial administrator
- Ethel Sargant (1863–1918), British botanist
- Jane Alice Sargant (1789–1869), British writer
- Naomi Sargant (1933–2006), British educationalist
- Norman C. Sargant (1909–1982), bishop of Mysore in the Church of South India
- Thomas Sargant (1905–1988), British law reformer
- William Sargant (1907–1988), British psychiatrist
- William Lucas Sargant (1809–1889), English educational reformer and political economist
- Alix Sargant Florence (1892–1973), birth name of Alix Strachey, American-born British psychoanalyst
- Mary Sargant Florence (1857–1954), British figure painter
- Philip Sargant Florence (1890–1982), American economist

== See also ==
- Sargent (name)
