= Daniel Wycliffe Sargent =

Daniel Wycliffe Sargent (born 22 July 1850, Birmingham, England - died 12 October 1902, Nigeria) was an early explorer of Africa.

One of eight children, he was born to John and Ann (née Beeney) Sargent. His brother, Edward, was an American architect.

As Agent General of the British Government, he signed treaties with many African chiefs which allowed the British to establish the Southern Nigeria Protectorate. He was listed as the Agent General of the Royal Niger Company 1889 in Akassa.

Daniel Sargent had three wives. His second wife, Utsekanua, was the daughter of an African chief. They had one daughter, Ellen Utsekanwa Sargent.
