= Justice Sargent =

Justice Sargent may refer to:

- Jonathan Everett Sargent (1816–1890), chief justice of the New Hampshire Supreme Court
- Nathaniel Peaslee Sargent (1731–1791), associate justice and chief justice of the Massachusetts Supreme Judicial Court
