= Mohawk skywalkers =

Mohawk ironworkers who built bridges and buildings

Mohawk skywalkers is a nickname for Mohawk people who have worked as ironworkers (Mohawk: Rarihsta'kehró:non / Ratirihsta'kehró:non) and other construction workers who have helped construct buildings and bridges in American and Canadian cities including New York City, Chicago, Philadelphia, San Francisco, Detroit, Toronto, Vancouver, and Montreal. Mohawk workers have contributed to the construction of iconic structures across North America including the Empire State Building, the Chrysler Building, Sears Tower, the CN Tower, the Brooklyn Bridge, the Golden Gate Bridge, the San Francisco Bay Bridge, the George Washington Bridge, the United Nations Building, and the Twin Towers. Mohawk volunteers and workers contributed to both rescue efforts at Ground Zero and the rebuilding of the new World Trade Center.

The over 140-year history of Mohawk involvement in ironwork dates to the 1880s, when Mohawk workers from Canada and upstate New York began to travel to major cities across North America. In the 1920s, Mohawk families from Canada formed the ethnic enclave of "Little Caughnawaga" in Brooklyn, as many Mohawk ironworkers were employed in the construction of skyscrapers in Manhattan. According to the Journal of American Indian Education, Mohawk culture values "physical bravery" and the ethic of taking risks for the greater good of the people. In the 21st century, Mohawk workers remain involved in high-rise and bridge construction.

== Canada ==
The Mohawk involvement in ironwork began in 1886, when Mohawk workers were hired to help construct a bridge over the St. Lawrence River. According to journalist Joseph Mitchell, a group of Mohawk men from a nearby community were initially hired as temporary unskilled labor for this bridge project. When the Mohawk men showed keen interest in technical details of the construction and exhibited no fear of heights, they were trained in the skilled trades needed for the job. They soon became widely in demand due to their reliability and the excellent quality of their work.

The term "walking iron" is used to refer to Mohawk ironwork and the term "booming out" refers to Mohawks travelling to major urban cities elsewhere for work.

=== British Columbia ===
Mohawk ironworkers contributed to the construction of Lions Gate Bridge and the Fairmont Hotel in Vancouver.

=== Ontario ===
Mohawk ironworkers from Akwesasne contributed to the construction of the CN Tower in Toronto.

=== Quebec ===
Maja Vodanovic, mayor of the Montreal borough of Lachine, has credited Mohawk workers for their contributions to Canadian construction work, saying that "The Mohawk helped build modern-day Canada."

Mohawk ironworkers contributed to the construction of the Jacques Cartier Bridge and Tour Telus in Montreal.

== United States ==
In 2015, the United States Mint released a $1 coin featuring Mohawk ironworkers to honor Kahnawà:ke Mohawk and Akwesasne Mohawk contributions to "high iron" construction.

=== California ===
Mohawk ironworkers participated in the construction of the San Francisco Bay Bridge and the Golden Gate Bridge in San Francisco.

=== Illinois ===
Mohawk ironworkers contributed to the construction of Sears Tower in Chicago.

=== Michigan ===
Mohawk ironworkers and their families settled in Detroit's Corktown neighborhood. The Indians of North America Foundation, hosted by Most Holy Trinity Church in Corktown, provided educational and social resources to the neighborhood's Mohawk population.

=== New York ===
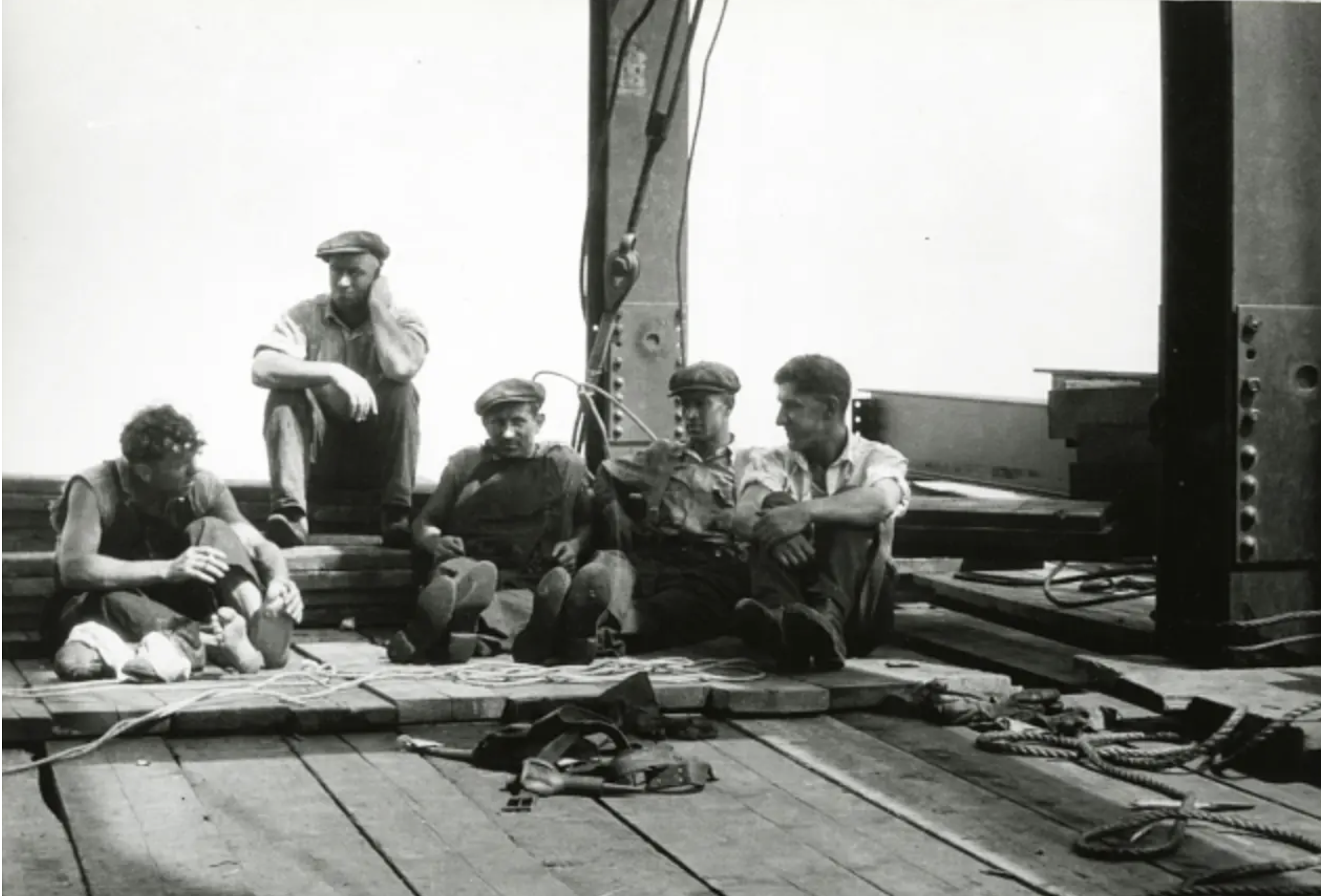
Mohawk ironworkers on the Chrysler building, late-1920s

Mohawk workers began to settle in New York City as early as 1916. The Hell Gate Bridge was one of the first construction projects Mohawk workers participated in. Almost every major construction project in New York City since has involved Mohawk workers. Mohawk ironworkers were integral to the shaping of New York City's skyline, contributing to the construction of bridges and high-rise buildings including the Chrysler Building, the Empire State Building, the George Washington Bridge, the Triborough Bridge, the Flatiron Building, the Waldorf-Astoria, the Henry Hudson Parkway, the RCA Building, the Verrazzano–Narrows Bridge, and both the destroyed and rebuilt World Trade Centers.

By the 1920s, a Mohawk enclave of Kahnawà:ke and Akwesahsne families had formed in downtown Brooklyn called "Little Caughnawaga". By the 1950s, over 700 Mohawk people lived in Little Caughnawaga. The enclave lasted until the 1970s. While mostly Mohawk, other Haudenosaunee and Indigenous workers also lived in the neighborhood.

The 9/11 Memorial and Museum has hosted an exhibit on the Mohawk skywalkers titled "Skywalkers: A Portrait of Mohawk Ironworkers at the World Trade Center".

=== Pennsylvania ===
In 1925, the Canadian Kahnawake Mohawk worker Paul K. Diablo was arrested in Philadelphia. In a landmark 1927 federal court case, the judge cited the Jay Treaty of 1794 to rule that Mohawks are legally entitled to freely cross the Canada–United States border because the border crosses the Indigenous homeland of the Mohawk people.

== See also ==
- Indigenous architecture
- High Steel
