= Kevin Sargent =

Kevin Sargent may refer to:

- Kevin Sargent (American football) (born 1969), American football player
- Kevin Sargent (composer), film and television composer
