= Ida Sargent (musician) =

1920s radio presenter and musician

- Born: 3 June 1893; Nottingham
- Died: 22 December 1989 (aged 96)
- Occupations: Radio presenter, composer, musician
- Instruments: Voice, piano

Ida Sargent (3 June 1893 - 22 December 1989) was a musician, a published composer and a BBC radio presenter in the 1920s. Known as 'Auntie Ida' and 'The Nightingale' during her time at the BBC she featured regularly on Children's Hour and across other programming with her 'Songs at the Piano'.

== Early life and education ==
Sargent was born on 3 June 1893 in Basford, Nottingham. Her father was Thomas Sargent (1862-1931), a Nottingham lace manufacturer, and her mother Alice Wilkins (1864-1945). She attended the Royal College of Music, studying with Alberto Visetti and Cairns James.

== Career ==
Sargent was a published composer, her music appearing in the children's books of songs written by Marion St John Webb. With pictures by Margaret W. Tarrant and Dorothy Newsome, the book was described as 'an attractive volume of songs for children such as grown up people like to sing'.

As a singer, pianist and child impressionist, Sargent was known as 'Auntie Ida', and 'the Nightingale', entertaining British Broadcasting Company radio listeners in the 1920s. At a time when BBC radio consisted of a network of local stations, Sargent broadcast from the Nottingham relay station 5NG, the 16th BBC station which started operating in September 1924 and was based in Bridlesmith Gate. By 1931 Sargent had broadcast from 16 different British stations. She featured regularly in the Radio Times programme listings with her 'Songs at the Piano' and on Children's Hour, a programme specifically aimed at children, which from 1926 had a broadcast time of 5.15 pm until 6.00pm. She also broadcast twice at Lausanne where her 'Songs at the Piano' were quite 'taken' in Switzerland and she was 'much in quest'.

The early BBC 'Aunties' and 'Uncles' were well-known figures in the 1920s. A crowd of 2000 turned up at the wedding of 'Uncle Laurie' (L. Bagshaw) in Carrington, Nottingham in 1925, an occasion at which Ida and other BBC staff were present. Sargent's own wedding at the Friends' Meeting House, Nottingham, to fellow musician, Everard Haynes Berry, in April 1931, was a calmer event, having been kept quiet because of the recent death of her father.

Sargent became a member of the Nottingham Society of Artists at the age of 80 and left a bequest of £400 which was put towards prizes at Nottingham College of Art. She died in Nottingham on 22 December 1989, aged 96. In 2023 Ida's daughter, Gillian Shelagh Sargent Berry (b. 1932), also a musician, gifted a Steinway Spirio Piano to the University of Nottingham in recognition of her musical parents and the significance of music in her life.

== Selected works ==
- St. John Webb, Marion (1926) The Littlest One Again. Pictures by M.W. Tarrant & D. Newsome; Songs by Ida Sargent. G.G. Harrap & Co., London
