= Sarjeant =

Sarjeant is a surname. Notable people with the surname include:

- Ellen Sarjeant (1868 - 1939), New Zealand artist, curator, registrar and philanthropist
- Geoff Sarjeant (born 1969), Canadian ice hockey player
- Marcus Sarjeant (born 1964), British gunman who fired six blank shots at Queen Elizabeth II in 1981
- William Sarjeant (1935–2002), English-born Canadian geologist
