= Sargeant (surname) =

Sargeant is a surname of Latin (possibly Etruscan), early medieval English and Old French origin. It may refer to:

- Bob Sargeant (1947–2021), British musician and record producer.
- Carl Sargeant (1968–2017), Welsh politician
- Harry Sargeant III (born 1957), American businessman
- Howland H. Sargeant (1911–1984), United States Assistant Secretary of State for Public Affairs in 1952–53
- James Sargeant (born 1936), Australian Olympian
- Livingstone Sargeant (born 1947), West Indies cricketer
- Logan Sargeant (born 2000), American racing driver
- Stacey Sargeant, American actress
- Terry Sargeant (born 1946), Canadian politician

== See also ==
- Sargent (name) (surname)
