= Sargeant Township, Mower County, Minnesota =

Sargeant Township, Minnesota
- Township
- Location within the state of Minnesota Sargeant Township, Minnesota (the United States)
- Coordinates: 43°47′51″N 92°44′22″W
- Country: United States
- State: Minnesota
- County: Mower

Area
  - Total: 35.4 sq mi (91.6 km^{2})
  - Land: 35.4 sq mi (91.6 km^{2})
  - Water: 0 sq mi (0.0 km^{2})
- Elevation: 1,339 ft (408 m)

Population (2000)
  - Total: 316
  - Density: 8.8/sq mi (3.4/km^{2})
- Time zone: UTC-6 (Central (CST))
  - Summer (DST): UTC-5 (CDT)
- ZIP code: 55973
- Area code: 507
- FIPS code: 27-58594
- GNIS feature ID: 0665555
- Website: http://www.sargeanttownship.com/

Sargeant Township is a township in Mower County, Minnesota, United States. The population was 316 at the 2000 census. The largest town in the township is Sargeant with a population of 76 people. All other area in the township is unincorporated.

== History ==
The township is named for its first permanent settler, Harry N. Sargeant, a Canadian. He moved to Dodge County, Wisconsin in 1858 and then to Mower County in March 1865 where he purchased the south half of section 11 of Sargeant Township. The township was organized in 1873 and the Chicago Great Western Railway was built through it in 1887. The village of Sargeant was platted on September 7, 1894 in section 18 along the railroad.

== Geography ==
According to the United States Census Bureau, the township has a total area of 35.4 square miles (91.6 km^{2}), all land.

== Demographics ==
As of the census of 2000, there were 316 people, 97 households, and 83 families residing in the township. The population density was 8.9 people per square mile (3.4/km^{2}). There were 101 housing units at an average density of 2.9/sq mi (1.1/km^{2}). The racial makeup of the township was 97.47% White, 0.32% African American, 0.63% Asian, and 1.58% from two or more races. 0.00% of the population were Hispanic or Latino of any race.

There were 97 households, out of which 39.2% had children under the age of 18 living with them, 75.3% were married couples living together, 3.1% had a female householder with no husband present, and 14.4% were non-families. 13.4% of all households were made up of individuals, and 8.2% had someone living alone who was 65 years of age or older. The average household size was 2.68 and the average family size was 2.88.

In the township the population was spread out, with 30.4% under the age of 18, 4.4% from 18 to 24, 30.1% from 25 to 44, 22.2% from 45 to 64, and 13.0% who were 65 years of age or older. The median age was 35 years. For every 100 females, there were 98.7 males. For every 100 females age 18 and over, there were 105.6 males.

The median income for a household in the township was $46,875, and the median income for a family was $52,500. Males had a median income of $31,625 versus $25,000 for females. The per capita income for the township was $16,720. 21.5% of the population and 12.2% of families were below the poverty line. Out of the total population, 15.3% of those under the age of 18 and none of those 65 and older were living below the poverty line.

=== Cemetery ===
- Zion Lutheran Cemetery is located in section 2 of the township.
