= Édouard Toudouze =

French painter (1848–1907)

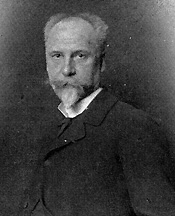
- Born: 24 July 1848; Paris
- Died: 14 March 1907 (aged 58); Paris

Édouard Toudouze (1848-1907) was a French painter, illustrator, and decorative artist.

== Biography ==
Toudouze was born to an artistically accomplished family. His father, Auguste Gabriel Toudouze, was an architect and engraver. His mother, Adèle-Anaïs Colin (1822-1899), a well known illustrator, was the daughter of Alexandre-Marie Colin and a descendant of Jean-Baptiste Greuze. In addition, his aunt was the illustrator Héloïse Colin Leloir, his uncle the painter Auguste Leloir, and his cousins the illustrators Maurice Leloir and Alexandre-Louis Leloir. His sister Isabelle Toudouze (1850-1907) was also a painter, and his brother Gustave was a novelist.

After studying at the Collège Sainte-Barbe in Paris, he served an apprenticeship with Isidore Pils. After brief studies at the École des Beaux Arts, he débuted at the Salon of 1867. Four years later, after serving in the Franco-Prussian War, he received the Prix de Rome in painting for his work, Blind Oedipus.

Although known for his mythological and historical themes, his canvases are mostly in the Genre style. As a rule, he tended to avoid involvement in the quarrels that pitted Academicism against Impressionism.

He received a gold medal at the Exposition Universelle (1889) and was named a knight in the Légion d’Honneur in 1892. He became an officer of that order in 1903. A large number of his paintings were acquired by the government for state-run museums.

In addition to his paintings, he did decorative work at the Opéra-Comique (a scene from the Jeu de Robin et Marion). He also produced a set of models depicting the history of Brittany that were made into tapestries at the Manufacture des Gobelins. The tapestries were on display at the Palais du Parlement de Bretagne until 1994, when they were moved to a museum for preservation.

His book illustrations included works by Sir Walter Scott, Théophile Gautier, Prosper Mérimée and numerous volumes from La Comédie Humaine of Honoré de Balzac.

== Selected works ==
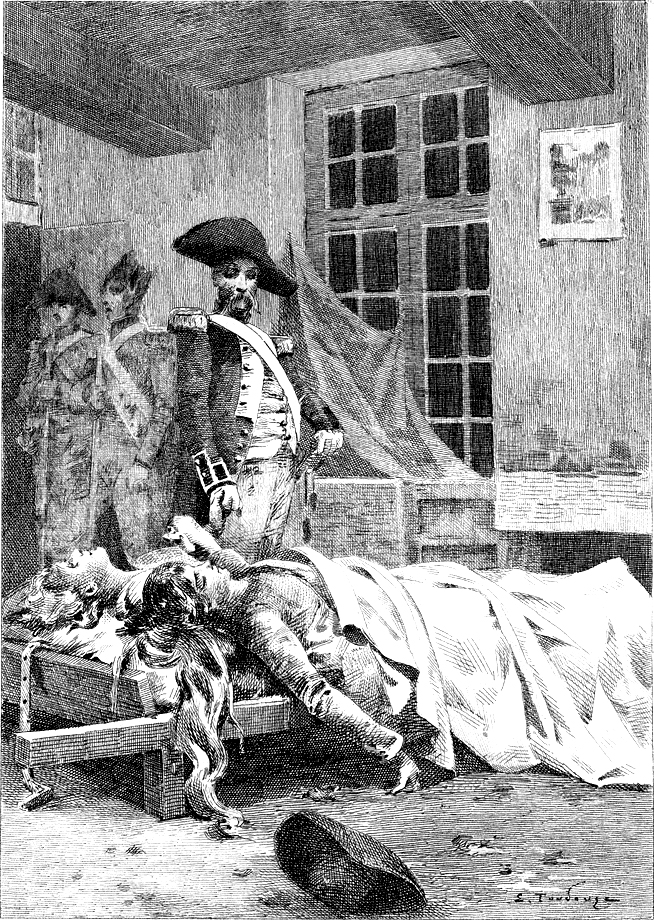
Illustration from
Les Chouans

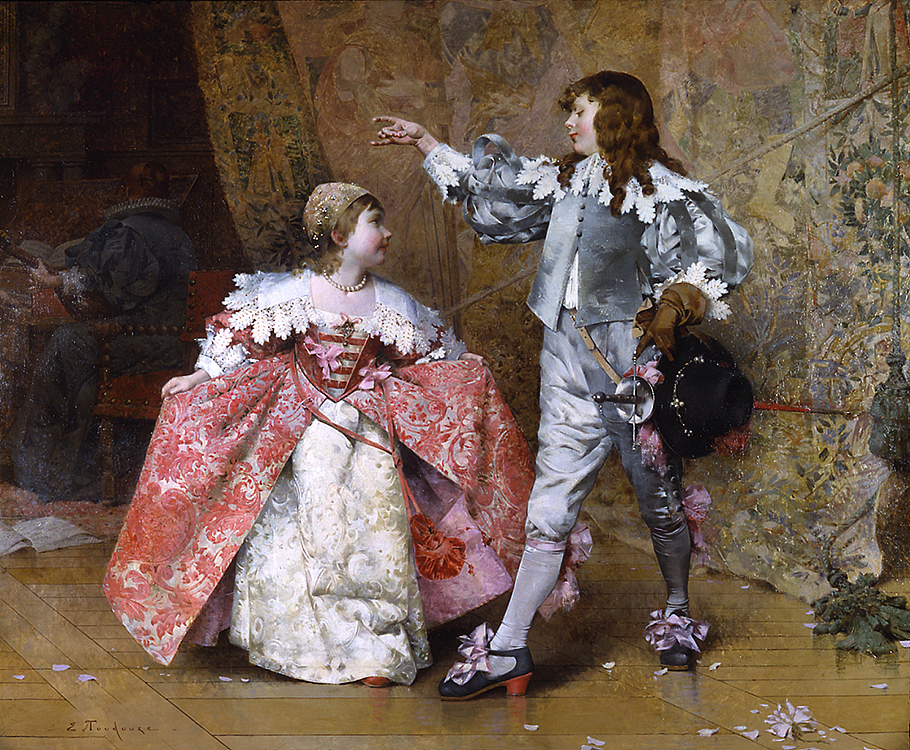
The First Dance

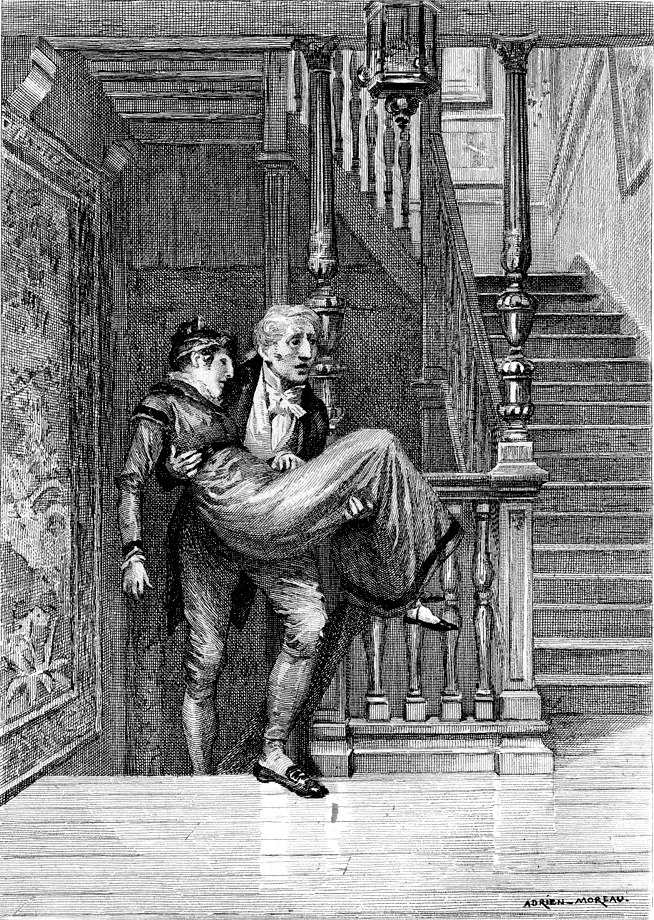
Illustration from The Quest of the Absolute

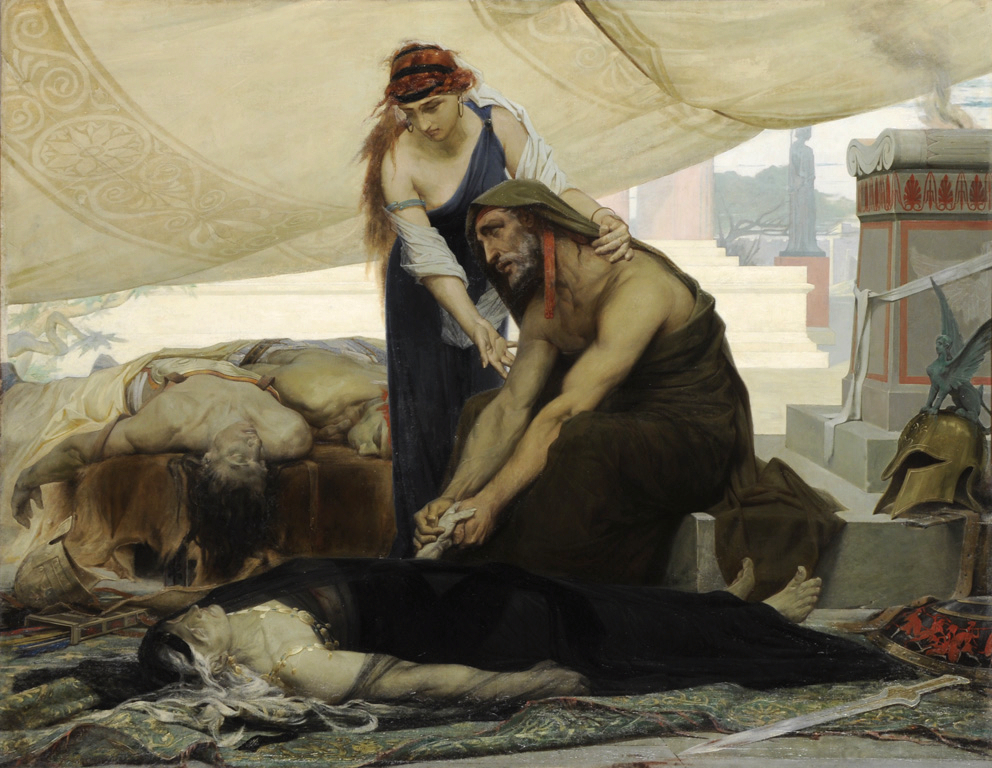
Blind Oedipus

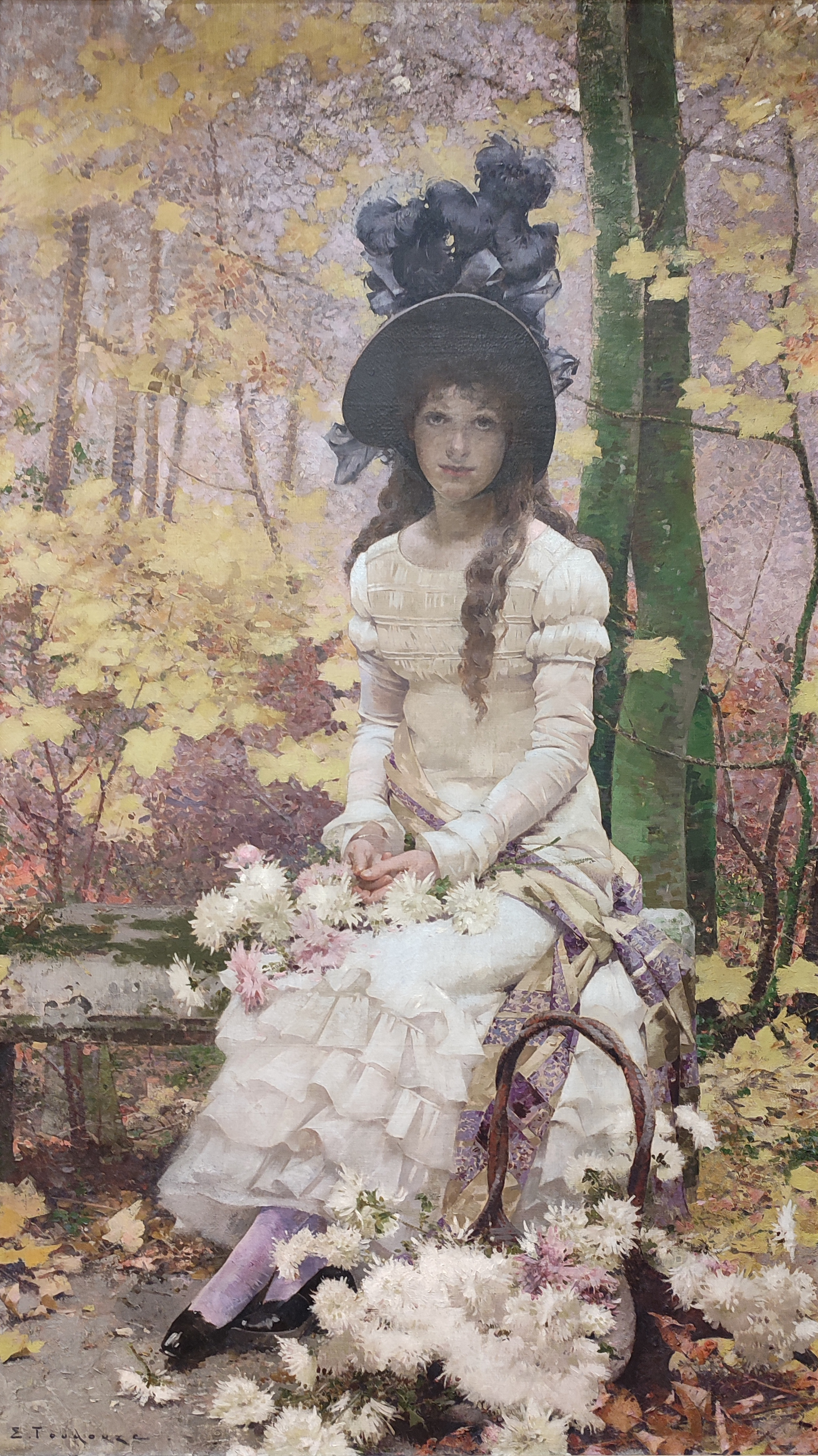
Autumn flowers
