= Toudouze =

Toudouze is a French surname. Notable people with this surname include:

- Adele-Anaïs Toudouze (1822–1899), French fashion plate illustrator and painter
- Édouard Toudouze (1848–1907), French painter, illustrator, and decorative artist
- Michael Toudouze (born 1983), American football player
