= Fashion plate =

Illustration of popular styles of clothing

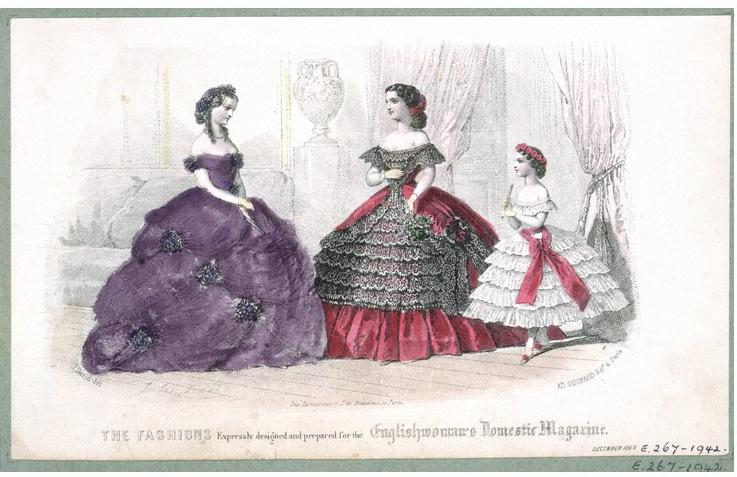
Fashion plate, 1860 V&A Museum no. E.267-1942

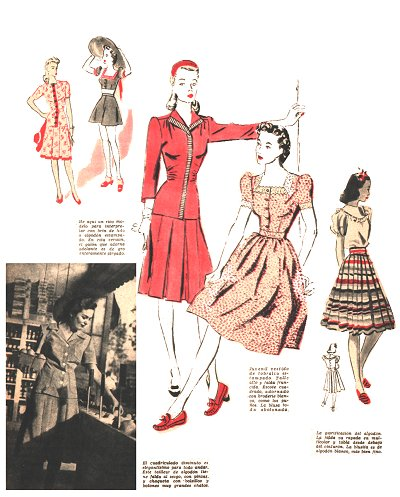
1942 fashion plate from Argentina.

A fashion plate is an illustration (a plate) demonstrating the highlights of fashionable styles of clothing. Traditionally they are rendered through etching, line engraving, or lithograph and then colored by hand. To quote historian James Laver, the best of them tend to "reach a very high degree of aesthetic value."

Fashion plates do not usually depict specific people. Instead they take the form of generalized portraits, which simply dictate the style of clothes that a tailor, dressmaker, or store could make or sell, or demonstrate how different materials could be made up into clothes. The majority can be found in ladies' fashion magazines which began to appear during the last decades of the eighteenth century. Used figuratively, as is often the case, the term refers to a person whose dress conforms to the latest fashions.

Fashion plates are frequently used as primary source material for the study of historical fashions, although commentators warn that as they were high-end aspirational catalogues it should not be assumed that the majority of people dressed in the same way expressed by a plate. A more accurate way to use fashion plates for study is to treat them like a modern high-end fashion magazine or designer's shop window with only a few people wearing such luxury items.

== History ==
Prior to the French Revolution, fashion plates were rare, and usually small black and white illustrations in annual diaries, known as pocket-books. This method of disseminating fashionable styles was mostly popular during the 19th and early 20th centuries. Their origins, however, date back to the 16th century, even if the history may not be continuous. Portraits, especially royal portraits, served as the base for the future of fashion plates, as they offered a visual cue as to the popular styles, fabrics and embellishments of the time. Dolls were also popular prior to fashion plates. In fact, Marie Antoinette's dressmaker, Rose Bertin, was known to tour the continent every year with berlines containing dolls outfitted with the latest fashionable styles.

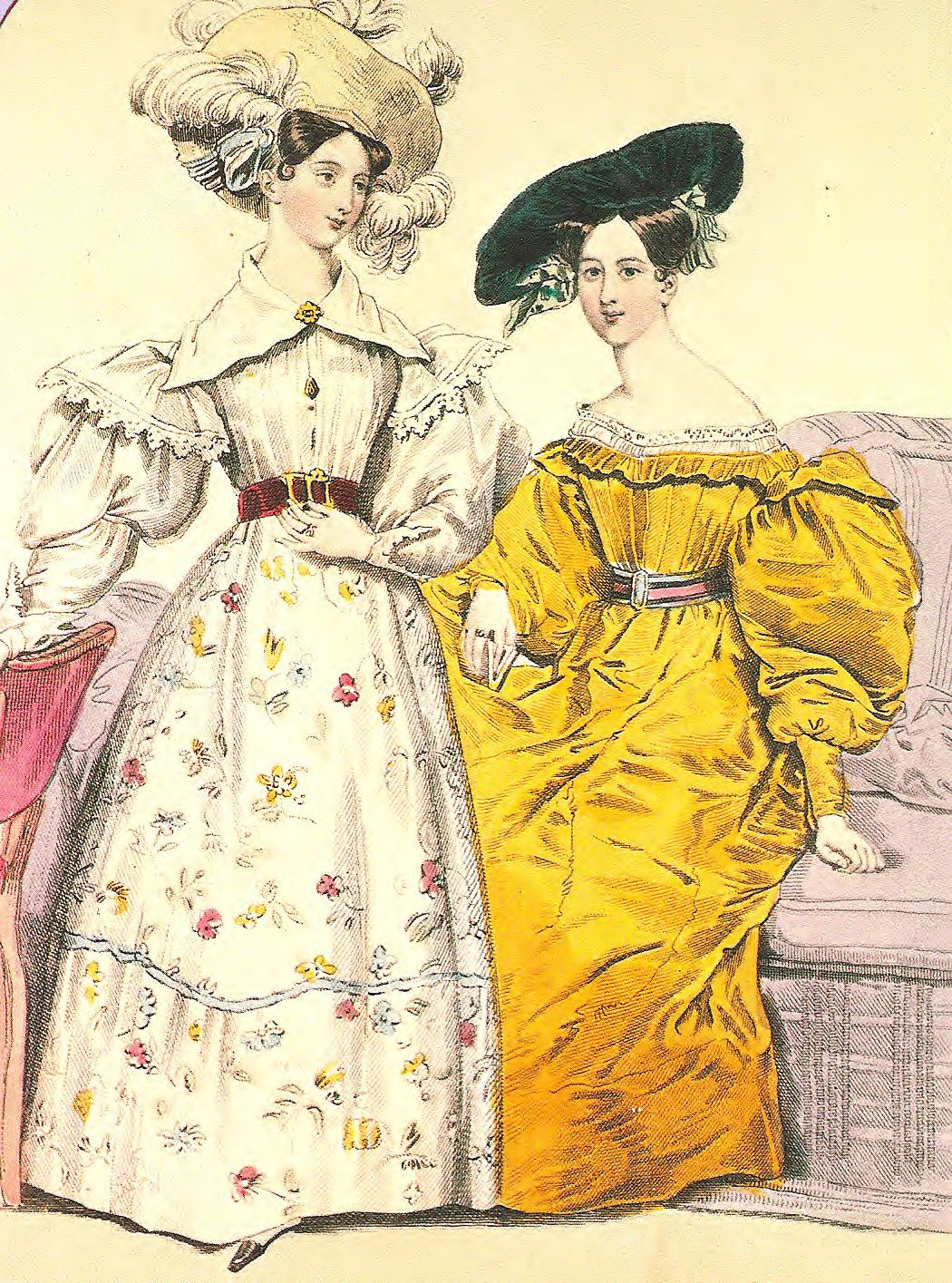
1830s fashion plate

Fashion plates were first circulated at the end of the 18th century in England, rather than in France, as would be expected. The Lady's Magazine, one of the first distributors of fashion plates in magazines, began publishing in 1770, spreading the trend across Europe. The plates were not decorated with colour shades until 1790. Prior to 1790, dressmakers would add colour to the fashion-plates themselves in order to enhance the designs and entice customers to order garments.

In France, La Galerie des Modes was a pioneer in fashion plate publication. Encompassing over 400 prints, this series was issued sporadically by the print merchants Jacques Esnauts (or Esnault) and Michel Rapilly between the years 1778 and 1787 and paved the way for the distribution of popular magazines such as the Magazin des Modes Nouvelles Françaises et Anglaises. As technology improved, speed of communication and transportation increased, thus allowing consumers access to foreign fashions, accessories and hairstyles. The introduction of an educated middle class also allowed for a more fashion-conscious population that became devoted to fashion plate publications. Until the 1820s, fashion plate engravings were made on copper printing plates, which limited the number of prints that could be taken due to the softness of the metal.

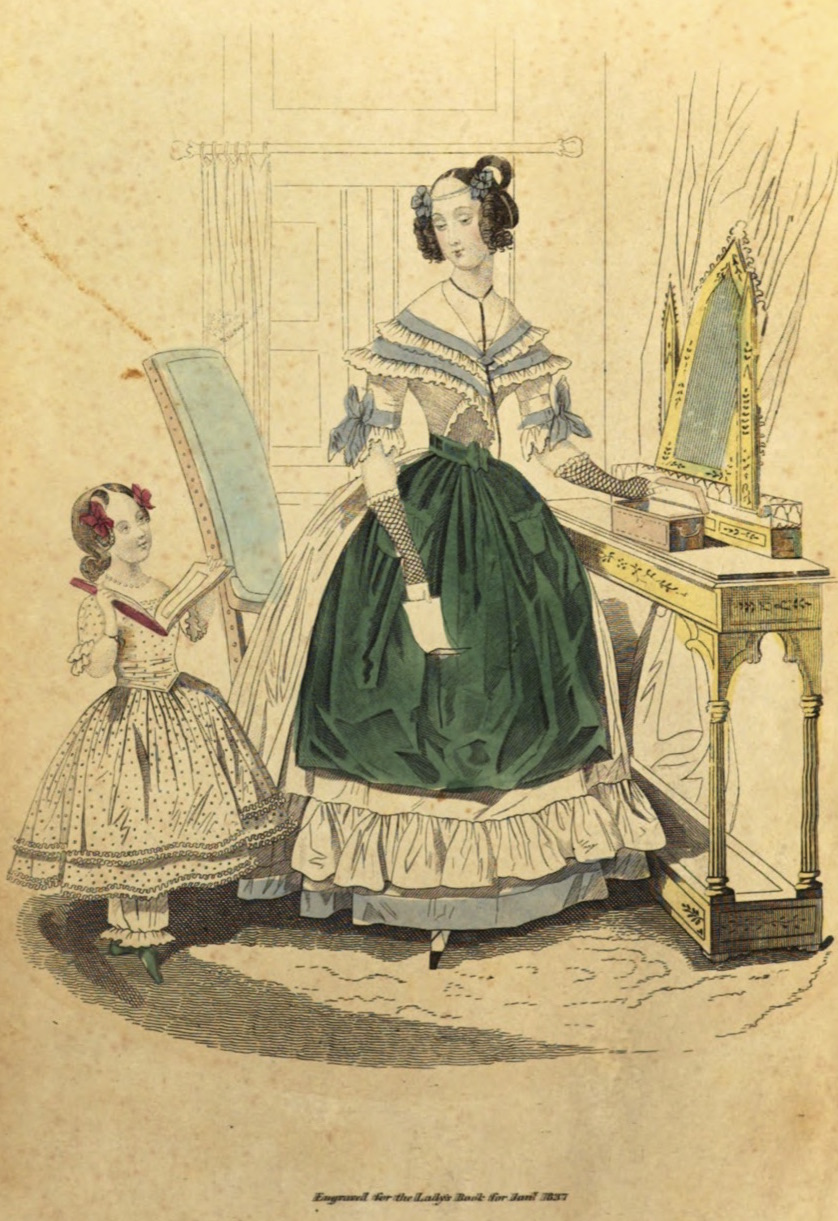
Fashion plate, Godey's Lady's Book, January 1837

By the 1830s, U.S. magazines began to include their own fashion plates, although these were often derived from imported French originals. The most popular magazines of the antebellum period, including Godey's Lady's Book and its competitors, particularly Graham's Magazine and Peterson's Magazine, boasted about the quality of their fashion plates. Publisher Louis Antoine Godey claimed in January 1857 that his fashion plates – hand-colored by a corps of 150 women colorists – "surpass all others." Godey also made sure his readers were aware of the considerable cost of his fashion plates, and indeed, some readers removed them from the magazine and displayed them as art.

It was a common assumption in the antebellum United States that "Character is displayed, yes! moral taste and goodness, or their perversion, are indicated in dress." Some influential Americans, including Godey's editor Sarah Josepha Hale, expressed concern about the effect of luxurious European fashions on the republican virtues of their countrywomen, and sought to promote simplicity and refinement as the defining trait of American style. However, the subscriber-driven and increasingly competitive market for periodicals meant that fashion plates would become increasingly common throughout the 1840s. To resolve this political problem, periodical editors increasingly touted their fashion plates as original creations, citing New York City or Philadelphia, the fashion capitals of the nation, as inspiration.

The increasing popularity of photography in the early 20th century spelled the end for fashion plates, as photos offered a realistic portrayal of fashionable styles.

In the late 1970s and early 1980s, Tomy revived the concept as a toy marketed simply as Fashion Plates.

== Fashion plates v. costume plates ==
Fashion plates should not be confused with costume plates. As outlined by the French social and cultural historian Daniel Roche, there was a point when depictions of costume and of fashion "diverged": the latter came to depict clothes of the present day, while the former came to represent clothes "after the event", that is, after the epoch of the fashionable style. "Le Monument de Costume" of Freudenberg and Moreau le Jeune, published in Paris between 1775 and 1783, consisted of costume plates.

== Fashion plate illustrators ==
- Adele-Anaïs Colin Toudouze
