= Alexandre-Louis Leloir =

French painter

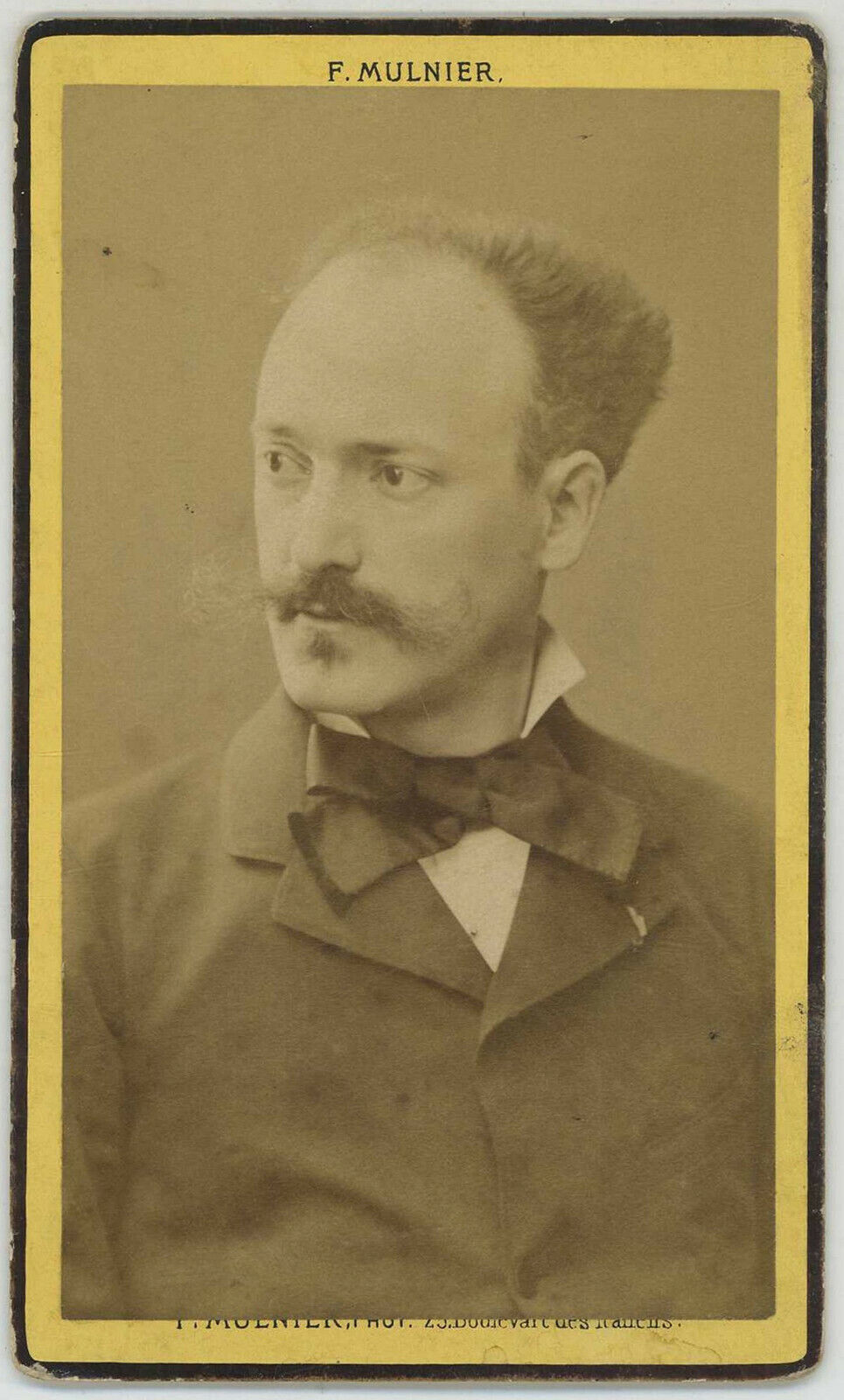
- Photograph of Leloir by Ferdinand Mulnier
- Born: 14 March 1843; Paris, France
- Died: 28 January 1884 (aged 40); Paris, France
- Occupation: Painter

Alexandre-Louis Leloir (14 March 1843 – 28 January 1884) was a French painter specializing in genre and history paintings.

== Life and career ==
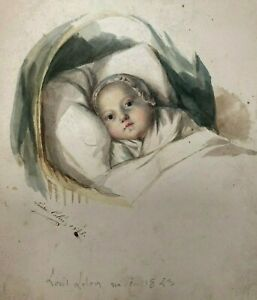
Alexandre-Louis Leloir as a baby, watercolor by his aunt Laure Noël, née Colin, 1843

Alexandre-Louis Leloir was born in Paris, France. He was born into a family with a rich artistic heritage, the son of the painter Auguste Leloir and fashion illustrator Héloïse Colin and the grandson of the painter Alexandre-Marie Colin. His younger brother was the painter and illustrator Maurice Leloir.

Leloir received his early art education from his parents and his maternal grandfather, Alexandre Colin, who had been a pupil of Girodet. In 1860, Leloir entered the École des Beaux-Arts and made several attempts to win the prestigious Prix de Rome. In 1861, he won a Second Grand Prix with The Death of Priam (Museum of Art and Archeology, Guéret), then again in 1862, 1863, and again won a Second Grand Prize in 1864 with Homer on the island of Scyros (Unterlinden Museum, Colmar). He received a medal at the Paris Exposition in 1878. He also distinguished himself in the competition for the painted half-figure (la demi-figure peinte) in 1864.

Specializing in historical subject matter and genre scenes, he participated in the Salon as early as 1863, with a scene of the Massacre of Innocents (Musée Bernard-d'Agesci, Niort). His work The Fight of Jacob with the Angel (Roger Quilliot Art Museum in Clermont-Ferrand) presented at the Salon of 1865 is an example of his virtuosity. From 1868, he directed his painting towards genre scenes, drawing inspiration from medieval everyday life, from the interiors of the Grand Siècle, in the Dutch manner, and in Orientalist scenes. He illustrated some editions published by Damase Jouaust, and also illustrated books by Molière and other notable authors. He participated in the foundation of the Society of French Watercolourists in 1879. He was made a Chevalier of the Legion of Honor in 1876.

== Selected works ==
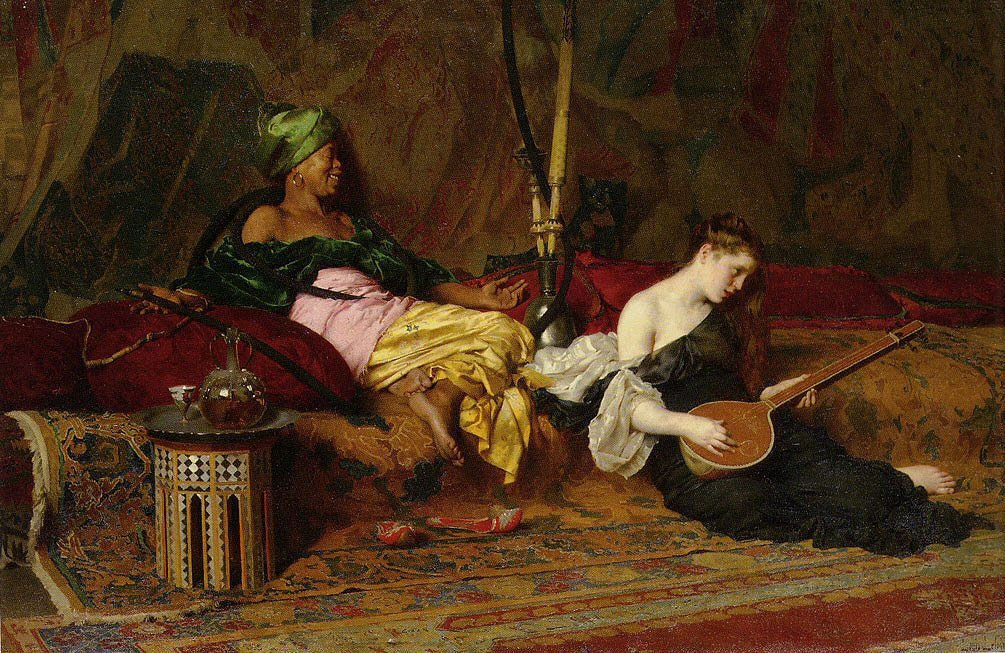
A Musical Interlude, 1874 (Private Collection)

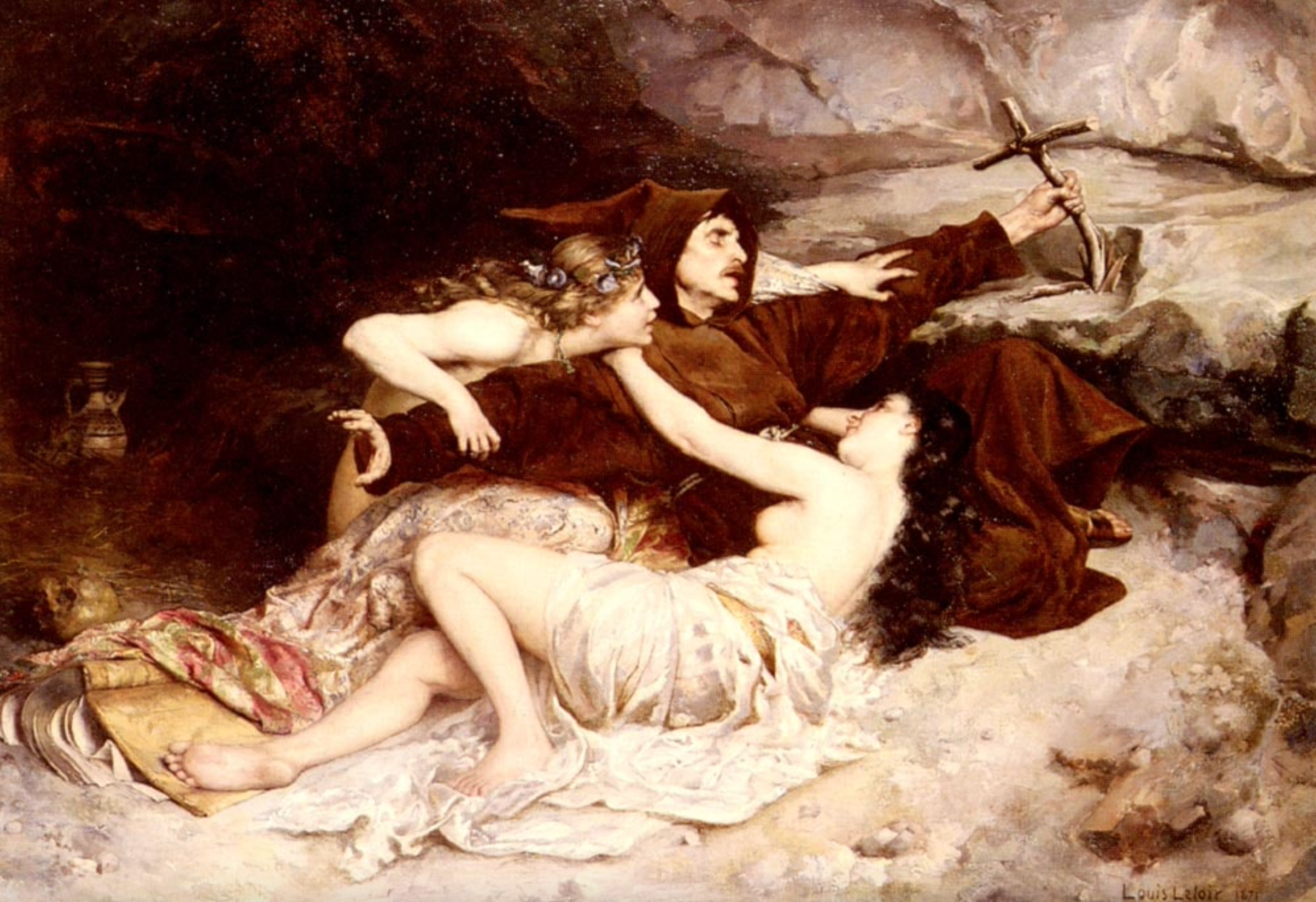
Temptation of St Anthony,1871

- La Mort de Priam, (Priam's Death) 1861, Guéret, Musée d'art et d'archéologie
- Véturie aux Pieds de Coriolan, (Coriolan's Journey on Foot), 1862, Location unknown
- Joseph Reconnu par ses Frères, (Joseph Recognised by his Brothers) 1863, Private Collection
- Le Massacre des Innocents, (The Massacre of the Innocents), 1863, Niort, Musée Bernard d'Agesci
- Demi Figure Peinte, (Half-figure Painted), 1864, Paris, École Nationale Supérieure des Beaux-Arts
- Homère dans l'île de Scyros, (Homer on the Island of Scyros), 1864, Colmar, Musée d'Unterlinden
- Daniel dans la Fosse aux Lions, (Daniel in the Lion's Den), 1864, Location unknown, formerly in Douai, Musée de la Chartreuse
- Lutte de Jacob et l'Ange, (Jacob Wrestling with the Angel), 1865, Clermont-Ferrand, Musée d'Art Roger-Quilliot
- Baptême des Sauvages aux îles Canaries, (Baptism of Natives in the Canary Islands), 1868, Angers, musée des Beaux-Arts
- Le Guet-apens, (The Ambush), 1869, Paris, musée du Petit-Palais
- Tentation, (Temptation), 1869, Private Collection
- Le Choix du Dîner, (Choosing the Dinner), 1872, New-York, Metropolitan Museum of Art
- Interlude Musical, (Musical Interlude), Location unknown, 1874
- A Chariot of Swallow, Date unknown
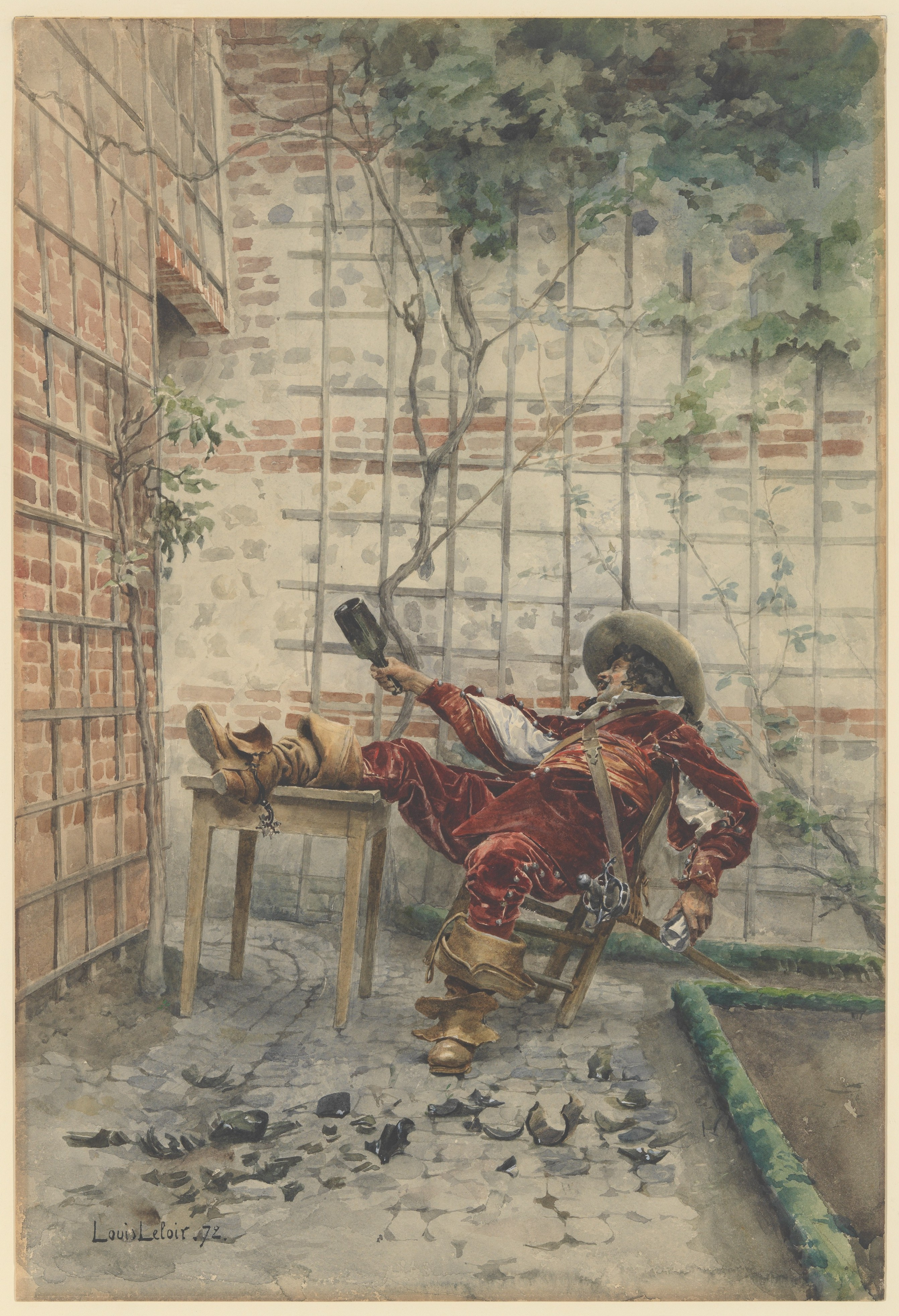
In His Cups, 1872

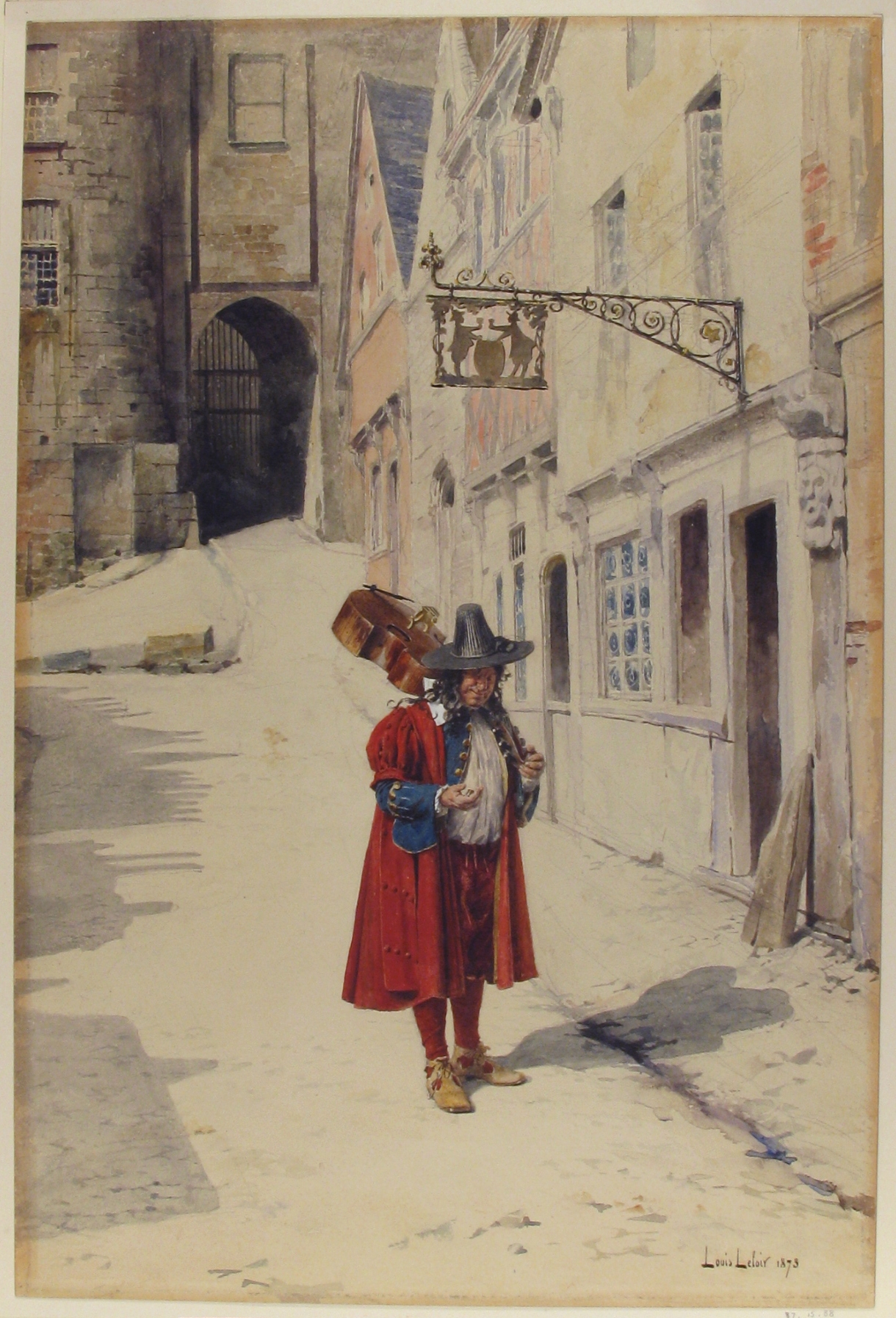
Wandering Minstrel; Old Nuremberg date unknown

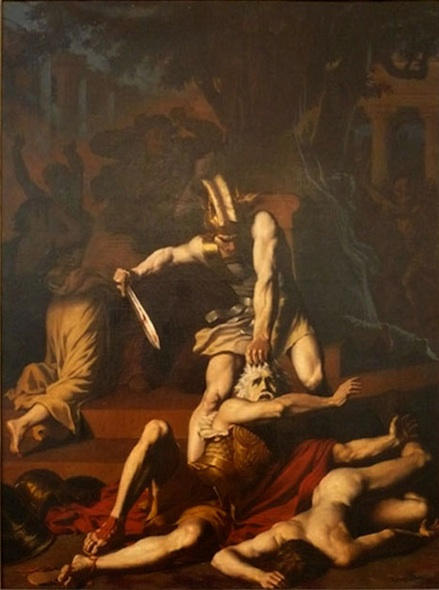
Priam's Death, 1861

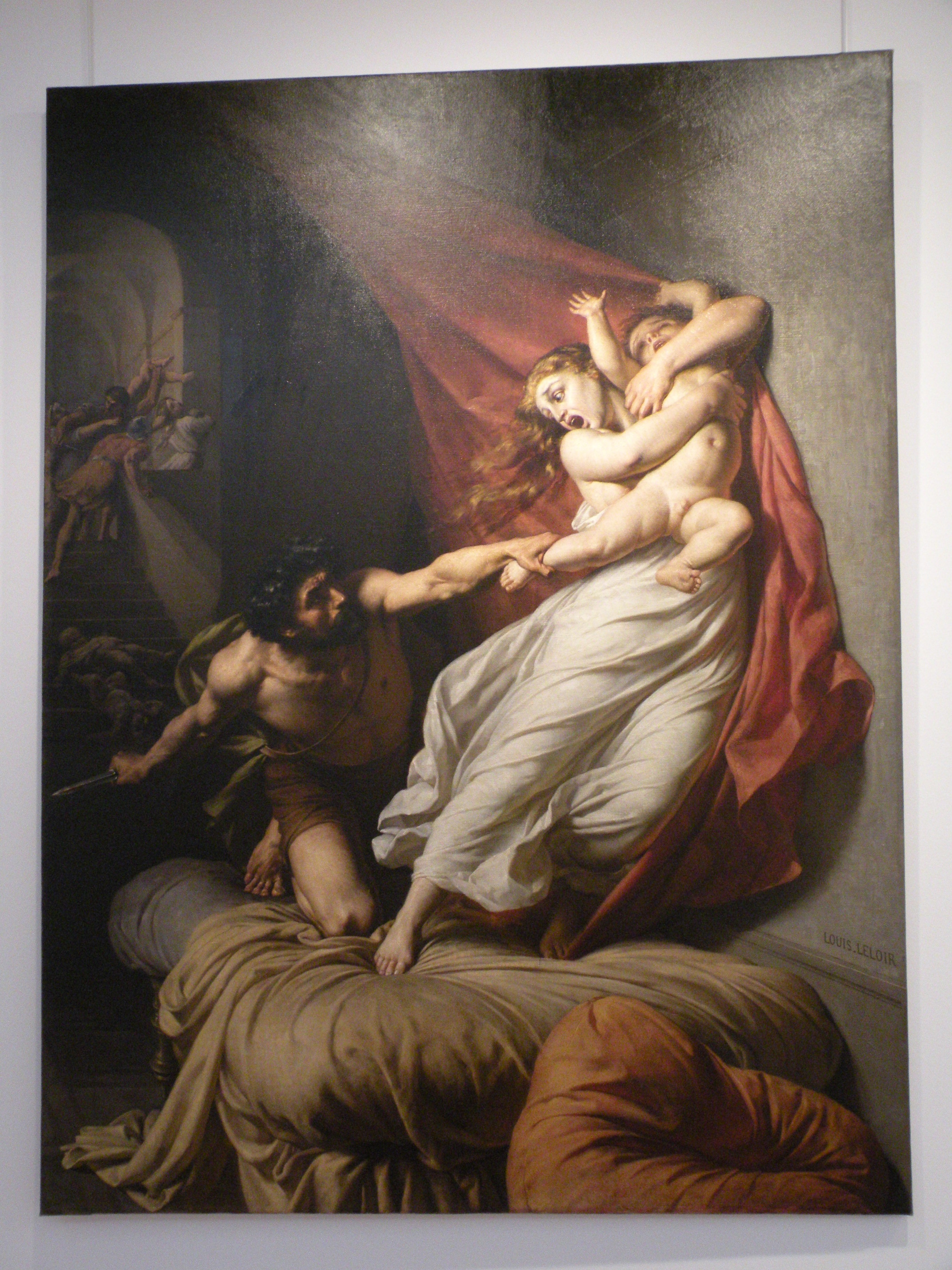
The Massacre of the Innocents, 1863

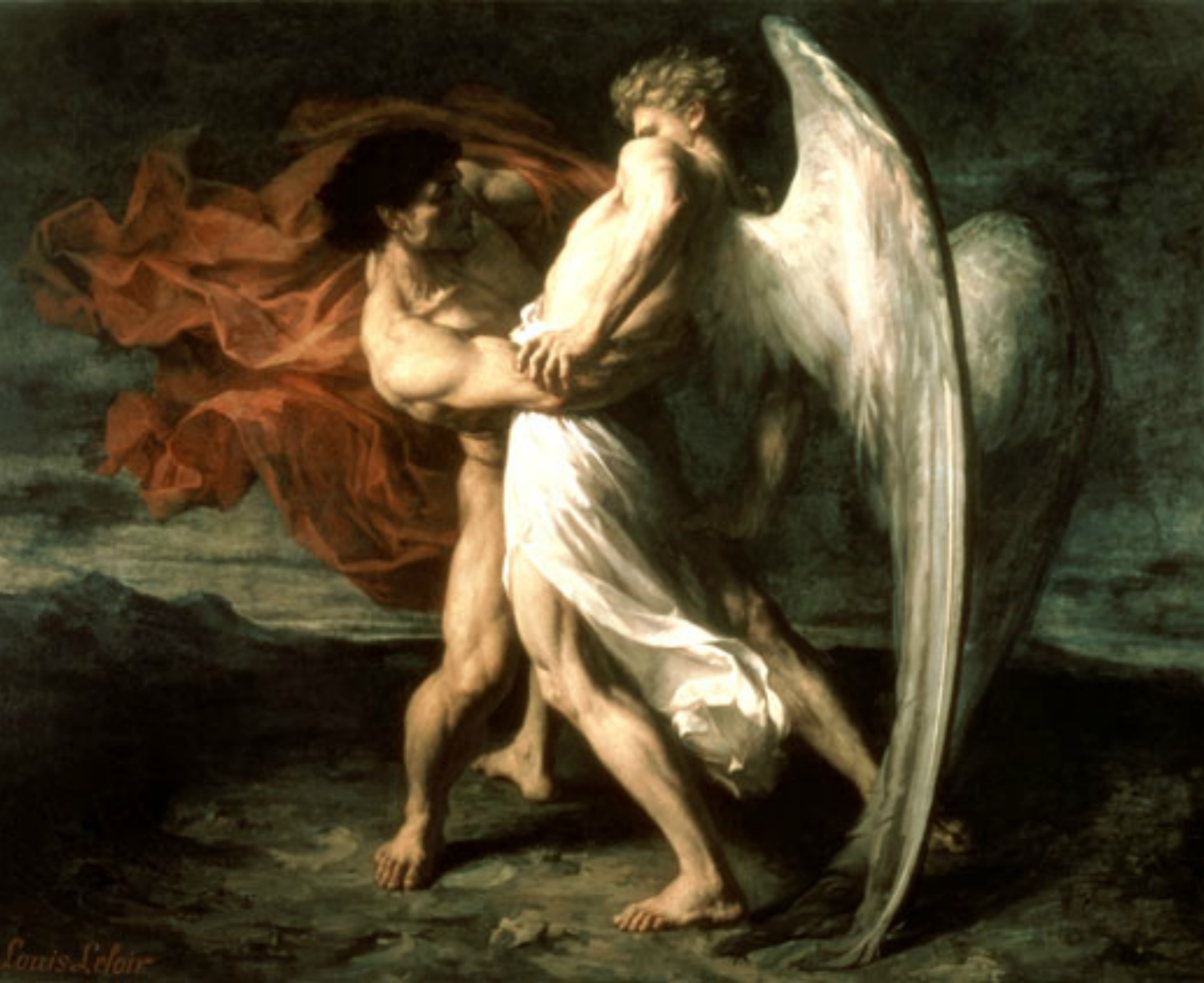
Jacob Wrestling with the Angel, 1865

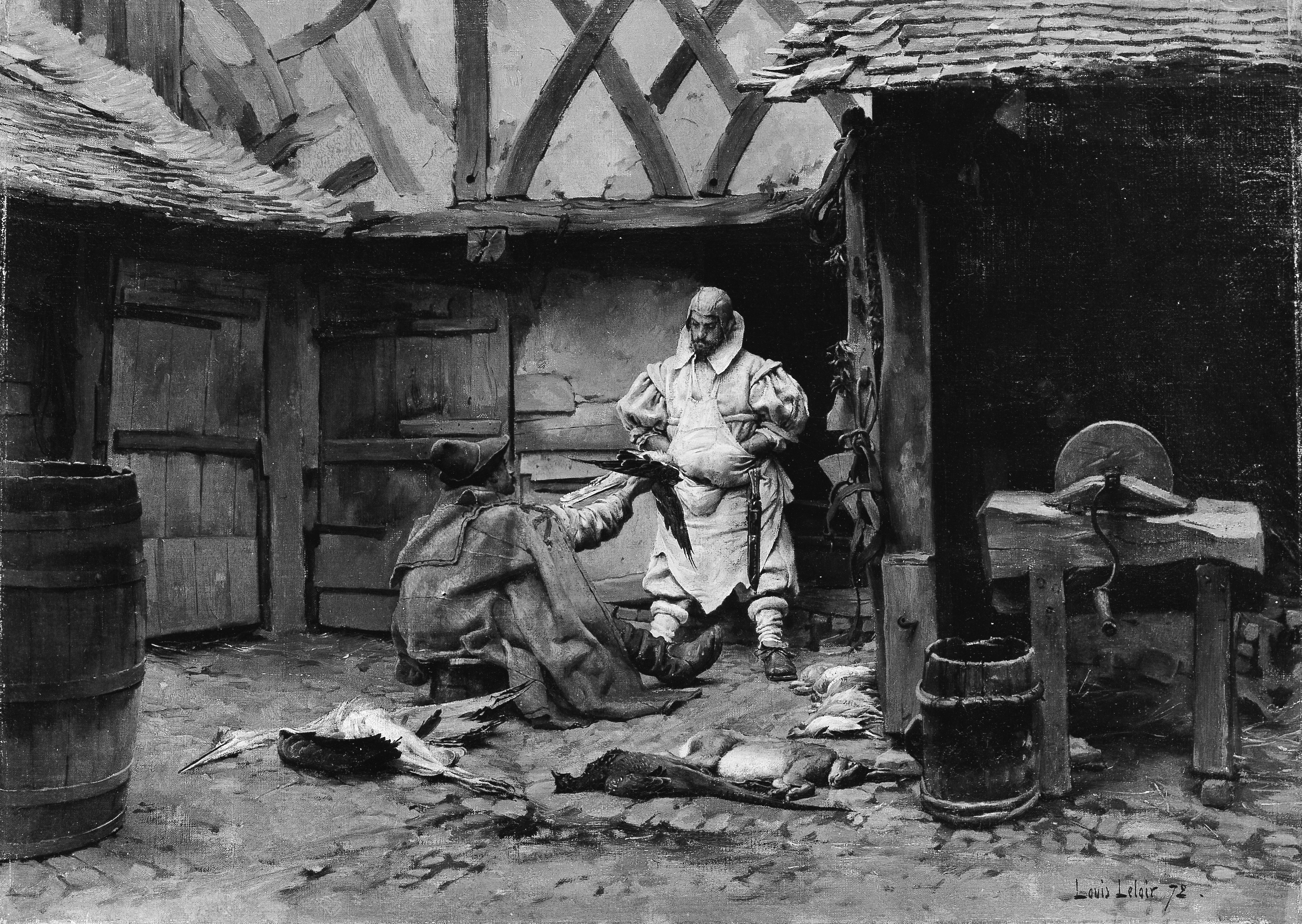
Choosing the Dinner, 1872

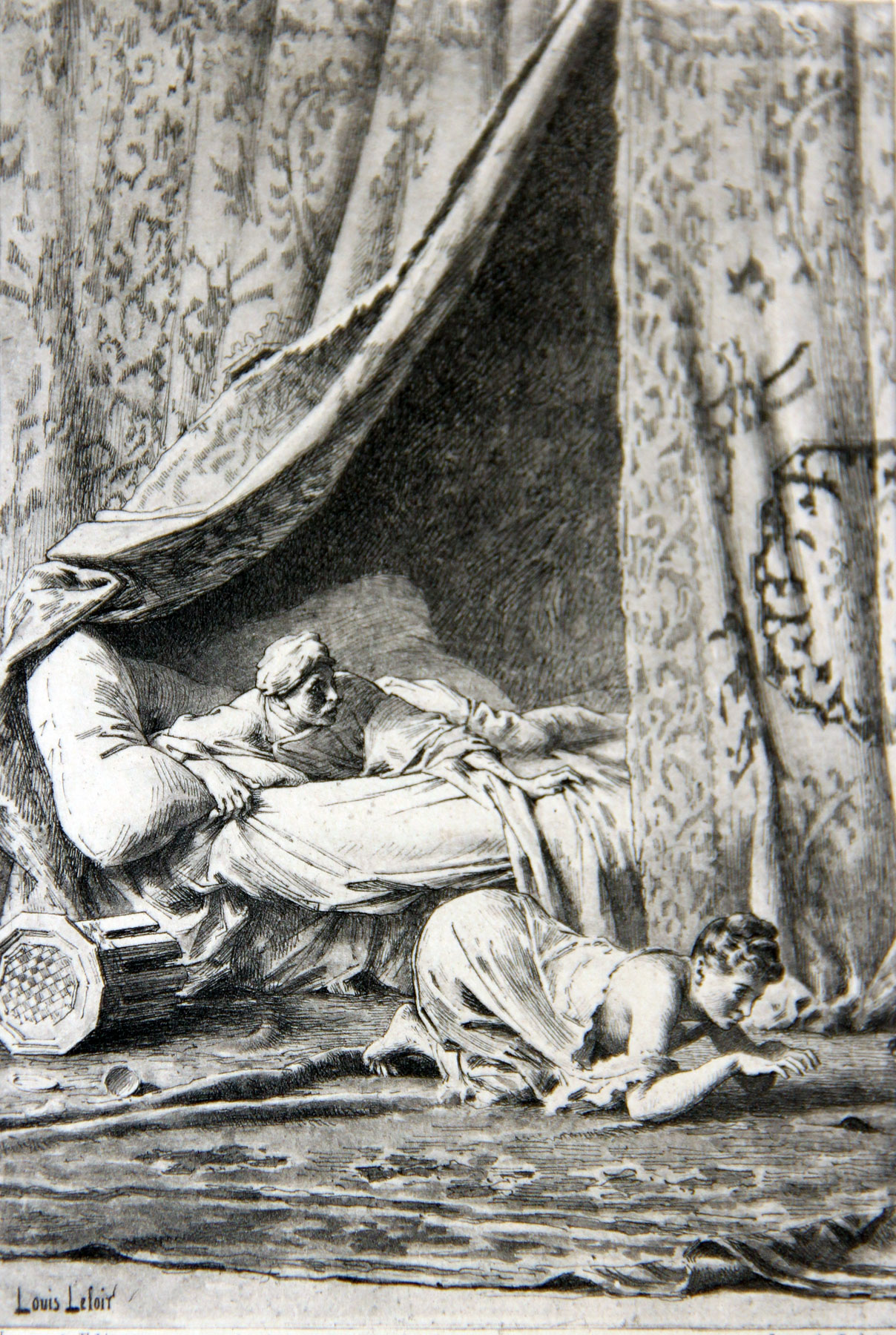
La chatte metamorphosee, (The Cat's Metamorphosis), Illustration, 1873

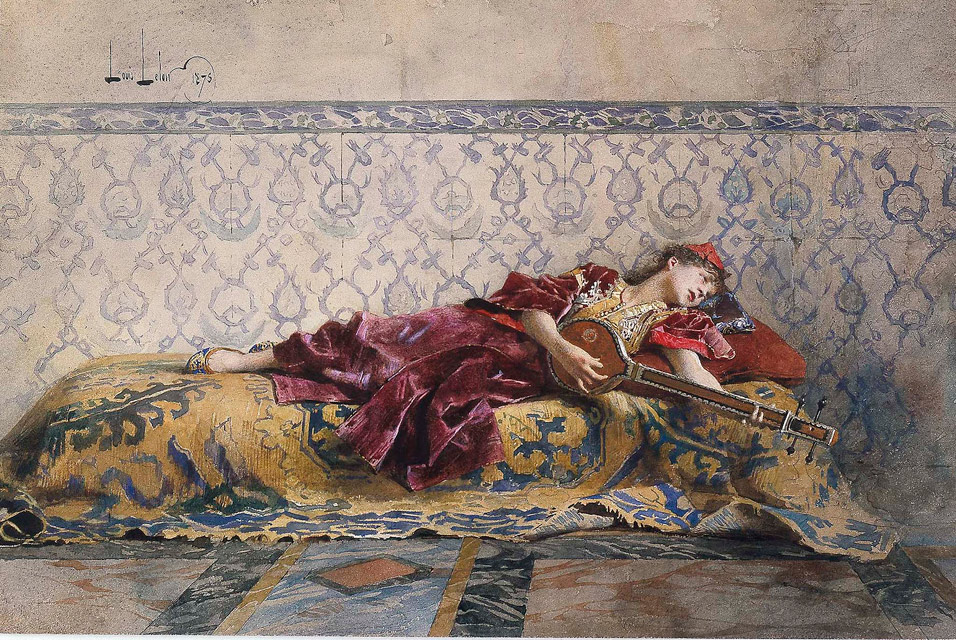
Moroccan Girl, Playing a Stringed Instrument, 1875

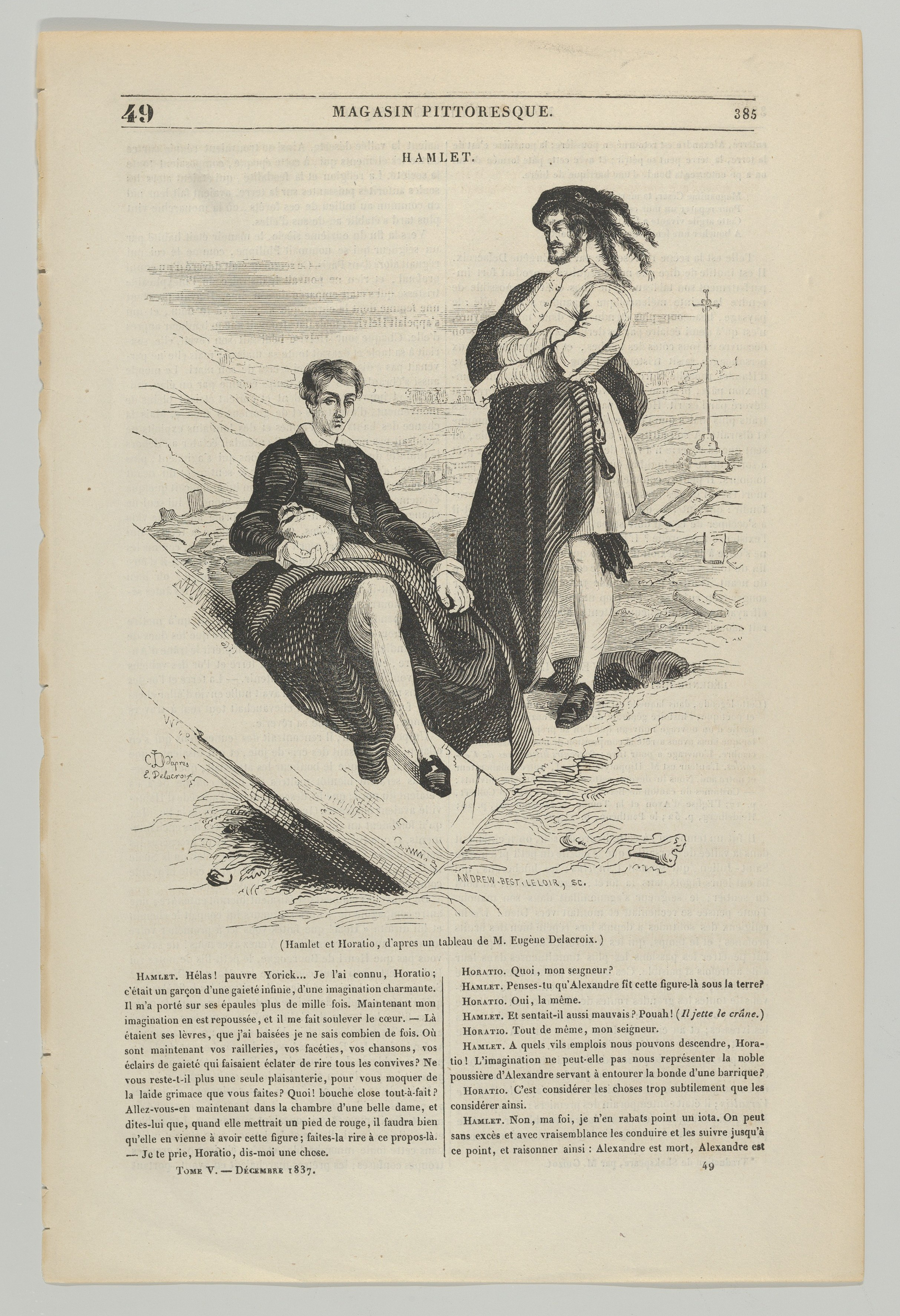
Wood engraving, Illustration after a painting by Delacroix of Hamlet and Horatio
