= Maurice Leloir =

French painter and writer (1853–1940)

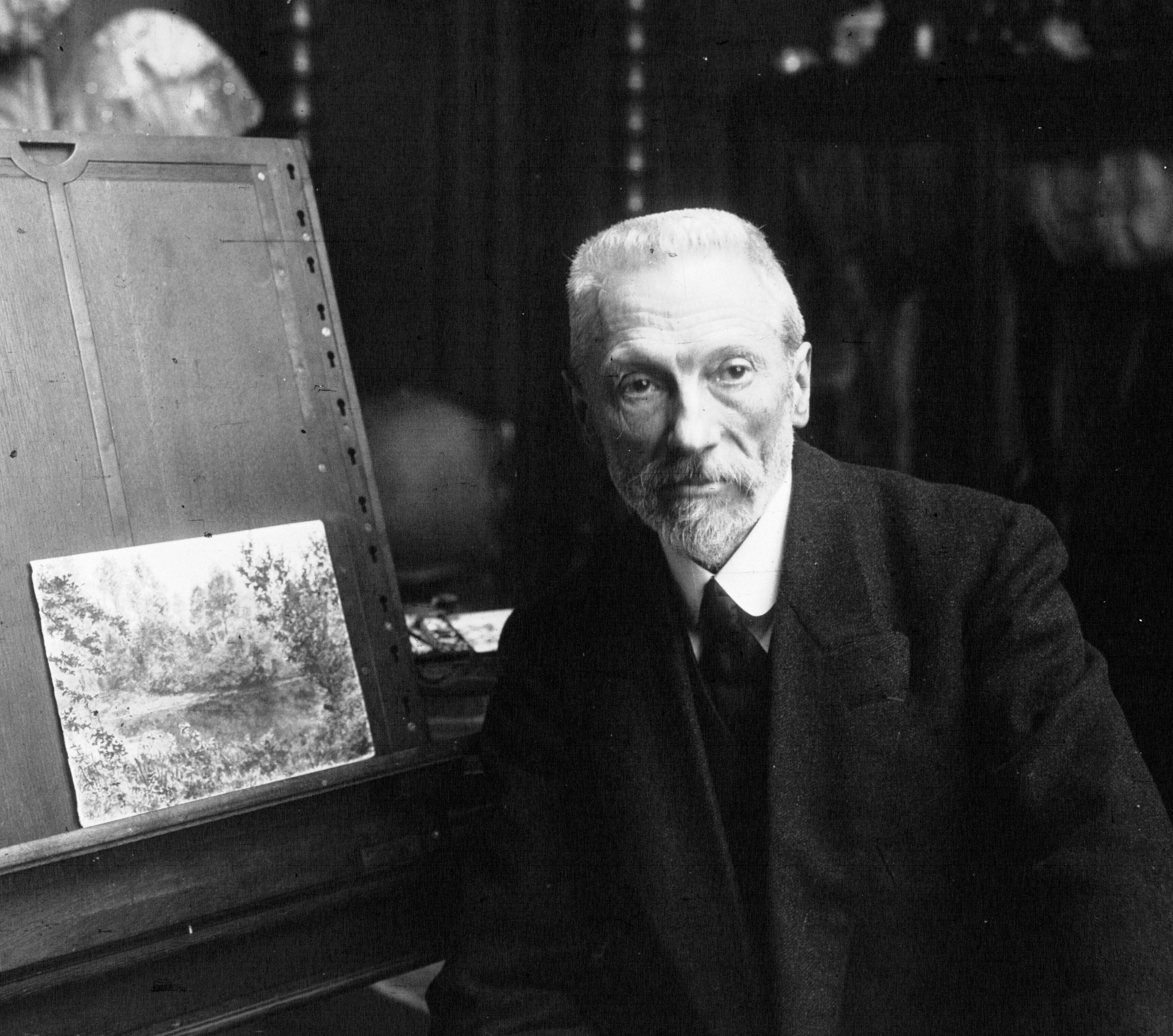
- Leloir in 1920
- Born: 1 November 1853; Paris, France
- Died: 4 October 1940 (aged 86); Paris, France
- Spouse: Céline Bourdier

Maurice Leloir (1 November 1853 – 7 October 1940) was a French illustrator, watercolourist, draftsman, printmaker, writer and collector.

== Biography ==
Leloir was the son, and pupil, of painter Auguste Leloir and watercolorist Héloïse Suzanne Colin, daughter of painter Alexandre-Marie Colin. His brother, Alexandre-Louis Leloir was also a well known painter and illustrator. Leloir married Céline Bourdier, with whom he had a daughter, Suzanne Leloir, who married Philippe, the son of Pauline Savari in 1912.

Leloir first exhibited his work at the Salon des artistes français, of which he became the secretary. With many other painters, he was a member of the Crozant School in the valleys of Creuse. In 1907, he was the founding president of the Société de l'histoire du costume, and he donated the family's collection of fashion prints to the society.

Around the 1890s, Leloir and his students flooded the picture book market, inspired by photographs representing accurately costumes and attitudes of the past, much appreciated by bibliophiles. He was a prolific illustrator of books, especially for children, such as the Richelieu by Théodore Cahu, of magazines and fans.

In 1884, Guy de Maupassant dedicated the short story Idylle to Leloir.

In 1929, Leloir traveled to Hollywood at the urging of Douglas Fairbanks to work on his last silent film, The Iron Mask. He chronicled his experiences in his memoir Five Months in Hollywood with Douglas Fairbanks.

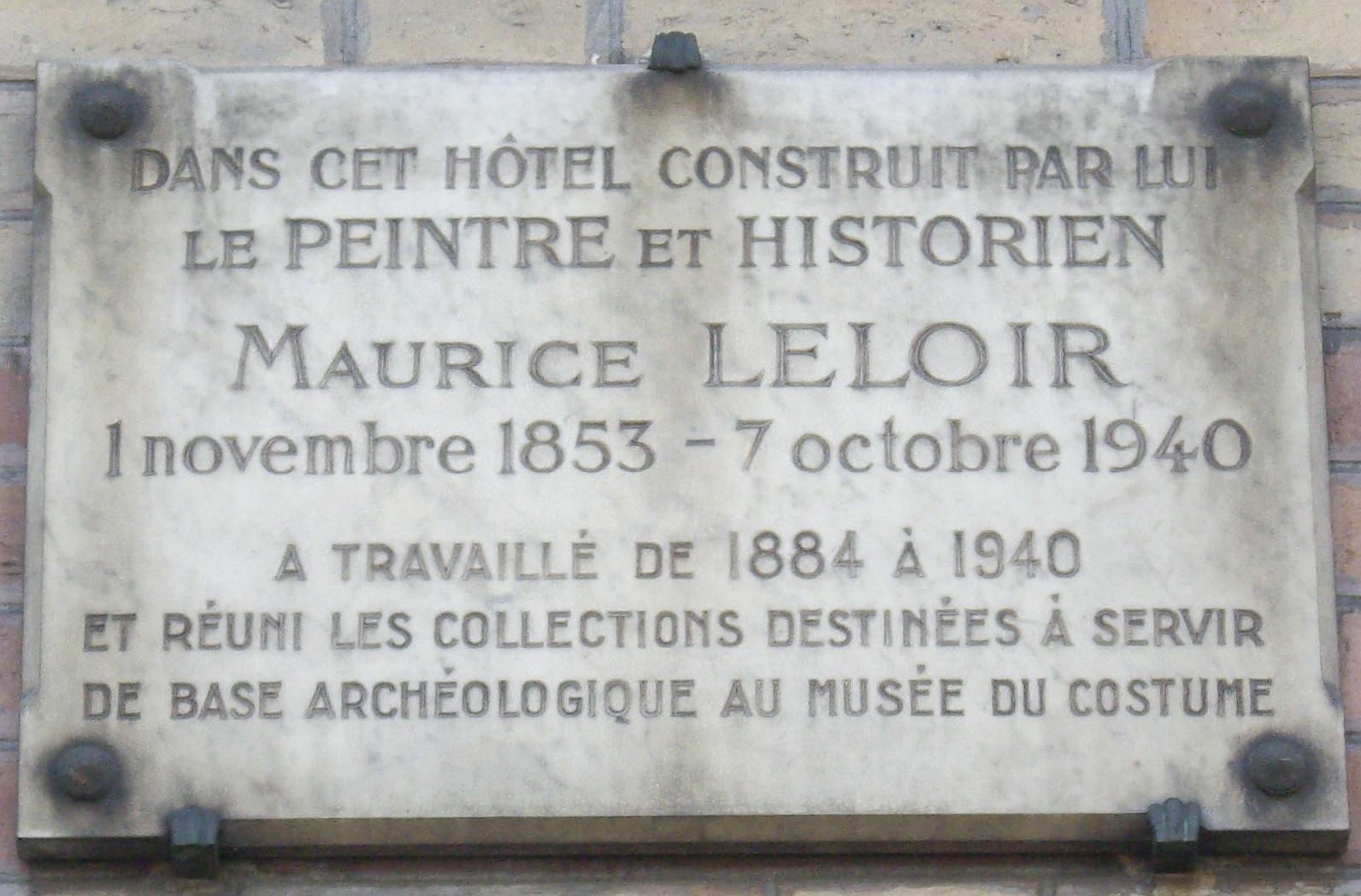
Memorial plaque at 21 avenue Gourgaud in Paris

== Works ==
One of Leloir's paintings was La Maison Fournaise (oil on wood), exhibited in the Maison Fournaise of the city of Chatou, but stolen in 1999.

== Publications ==
- Bernardin de Saint-Pierre (Illustrations by Leloir), Paul et Virginie, Paris, Librairie artistique, H. Launette et Cie 1888, 29 × 28 cm, 208 p.
- Alexandre Dumas (121 and 128 drawings by Maurice Leloir engraved on wood by Jules Huyot), Les Trois Mousquetaires, Paris, Calmann Lévy, 1894, 30 × 21 cm, 2 volumes de 502 et 473 p.
- Une femme de qualité au siècle passé, Paris, 1778, Paris: J. Boussod, Manzi, Joyant et Cie, 1899
- Alexandre Dumas (113 and 129 drawings by Maurice Leloir engraved on wood by Jules Huyot), La dame de Monsoreau, Paris, Calmann Lévy, 1903, 30 × 21 cm, 2 volumes 499 and 488 p.
- Gustave Toudouze (ill. Maurice Leloir), Le Roy soleil, Paris, Boivin & Cie, 1904 (repr. 1908, 1917, 1931) (1st ed. 1904), 92 p., 37,2 × 30,3 cm Full blue percaline binding, first plate embossed with a polychrome decoration representing the Sun King, title embossed gold on the back.
- Théodore Cahu (ill. Maurice Leloir), Richelieu, Paris, Combet et Cie, 1904 (1st ed. 1901), 84 p., 37,4 × 30,5 cm Full green ivy percaline binding, first plate stamped with a polychrome decoration representing Richelieu
- Cinq mois à Hollywood avec Douglas Fairbanks, Paris: J. Peyronnet et Cie, 1929
- Histoire du costume de l'Antiquité à 1914, t. VIII-XII, work published under the direction of Maurice Leloir, preface by Henri Lavedan, Paris: Ernst, 1933-1949
- A Mediaeval Doublet, Apollo: The International Magazine of the Arts, Vol. 23, No. 135 (March 1936) pp. 157–160
- Dictionnaire du costume et de ses accessoires, des armes et des étoffes : des origines à nos jours, Paris : Gründ, 1950
- Les confessions by Jean-Jacques Rousseau. Maurice Leloir illustre (eaux-fortes gravées par Champollion, Teyssonieres, Milius, Ruet, etc.) une superbe édition (preface by Jules Claretie) in 2 volumes in-4° (sur vélin de luxe plus 48 vol. de grand luxe sur Japon) publiée par la librairie artistique H. Launette, in 1889; ces illustrations sont reprises dans une nouvelle édition à la librairie Jules Tallandier, ca 1925 (3 volumes in-8° reliés, series "Les chefs d'œuvre de l'esprit").
Le Roy soleil

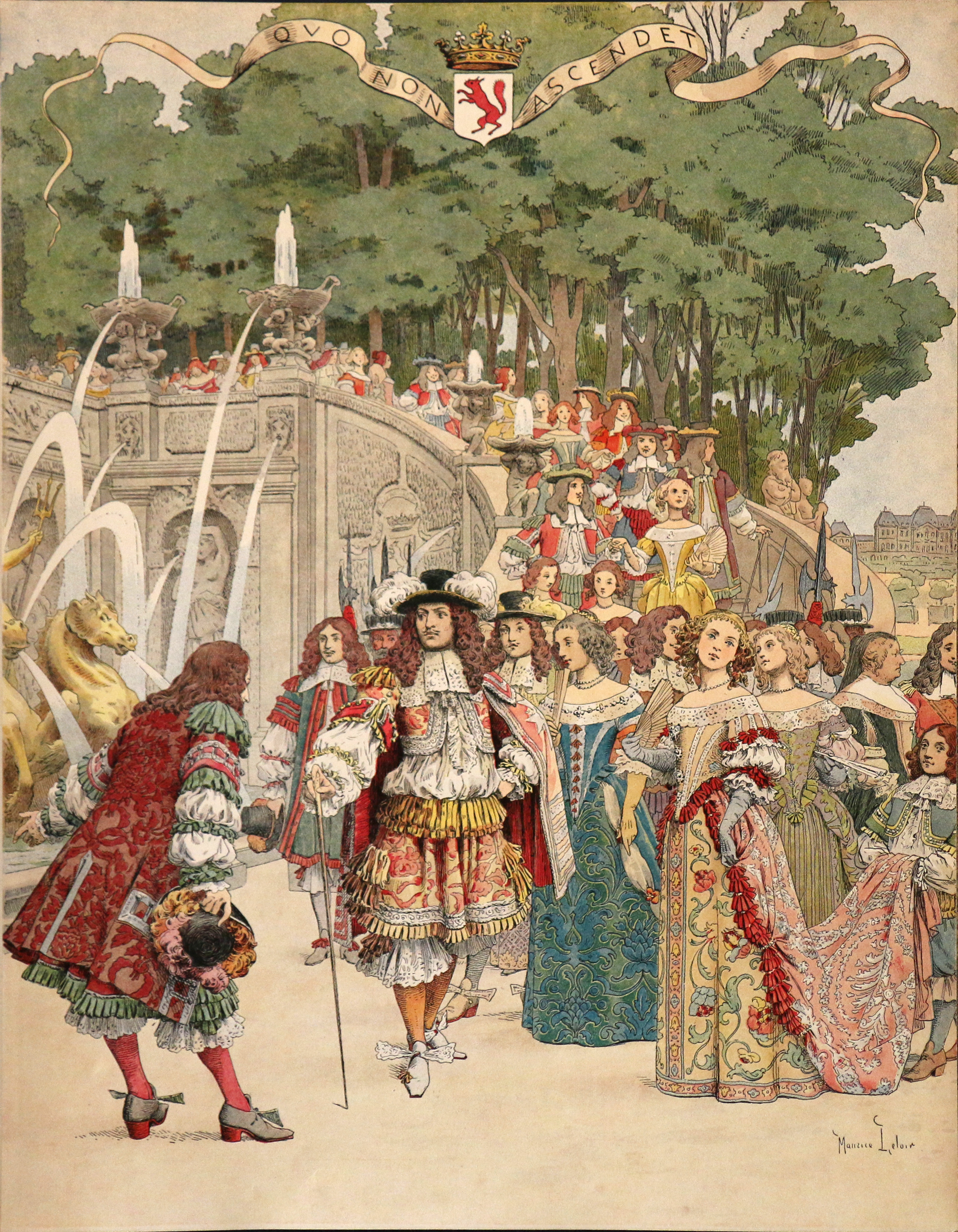
Nicolas Fouquet receiving the King at Château de Vaux-le-Vicomte

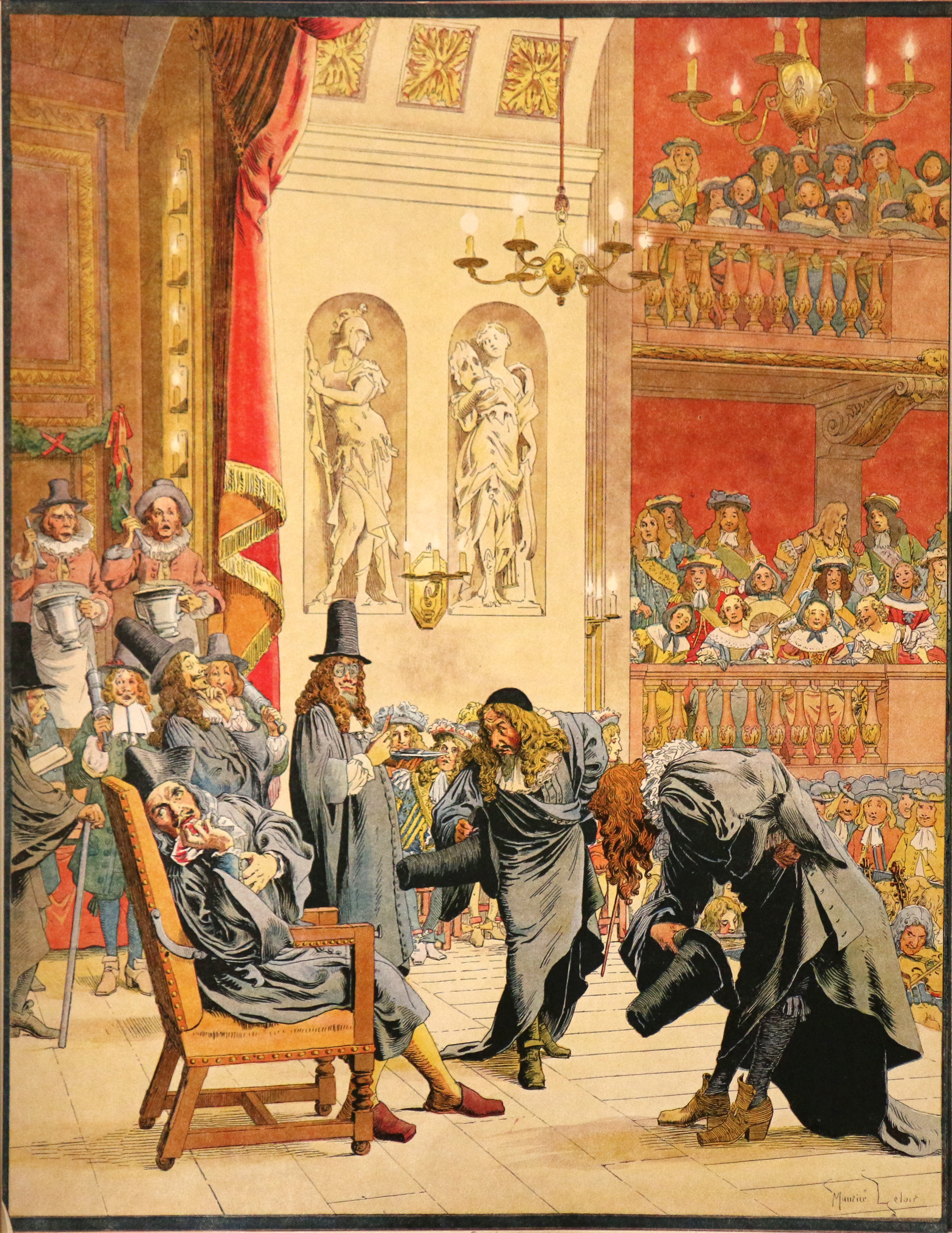
Molière's last performance

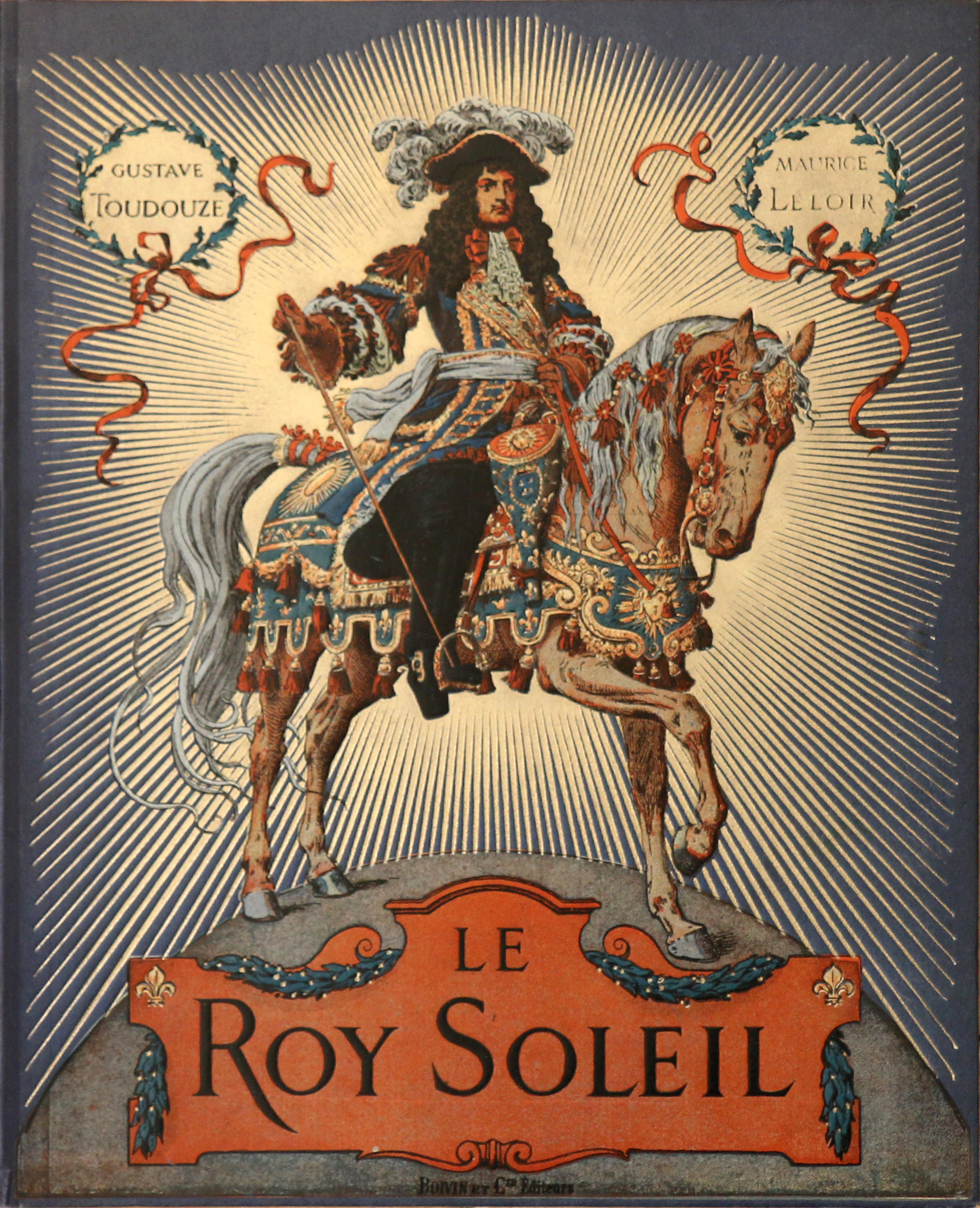
Premier plat du livre

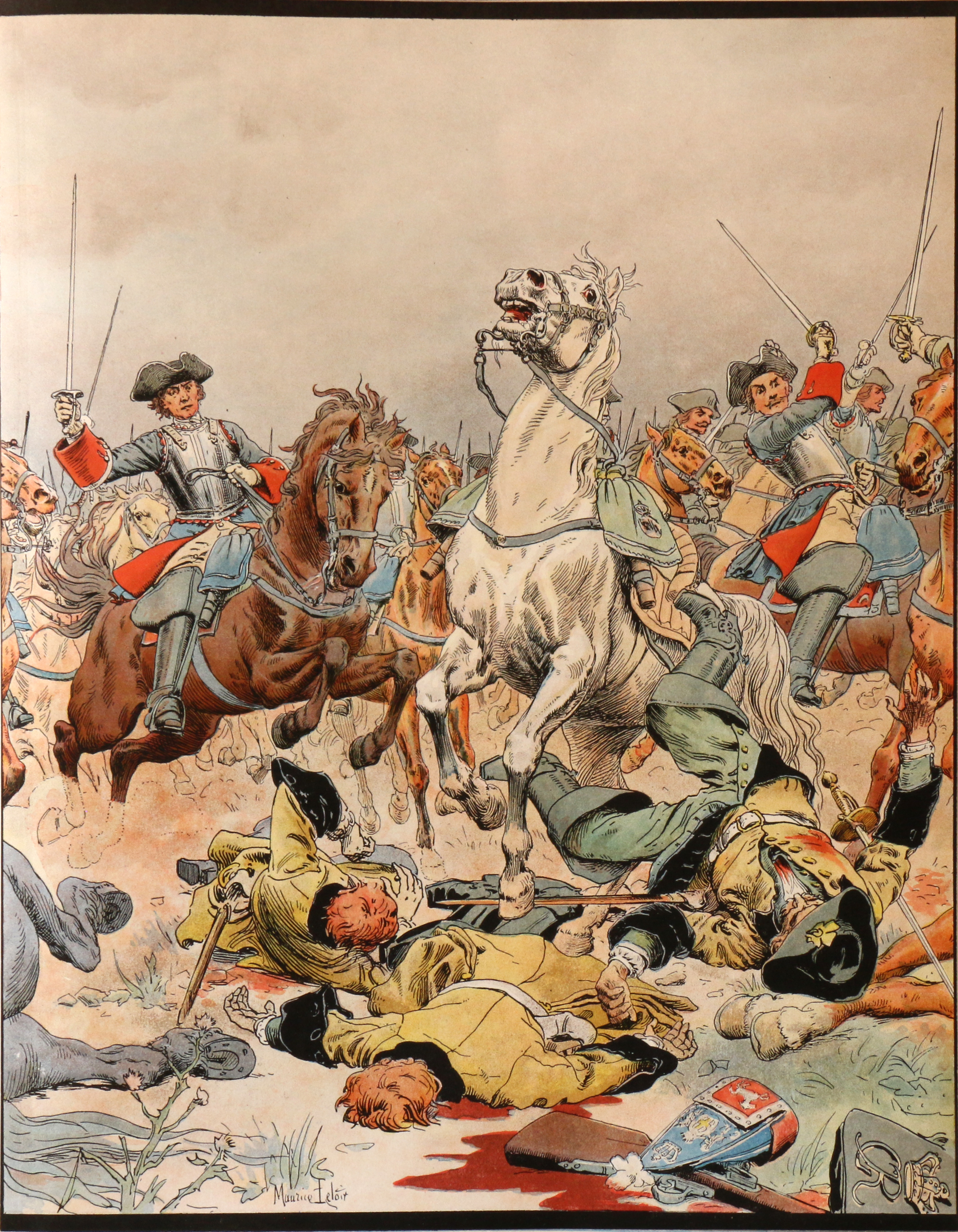
Battle of Malplaquet

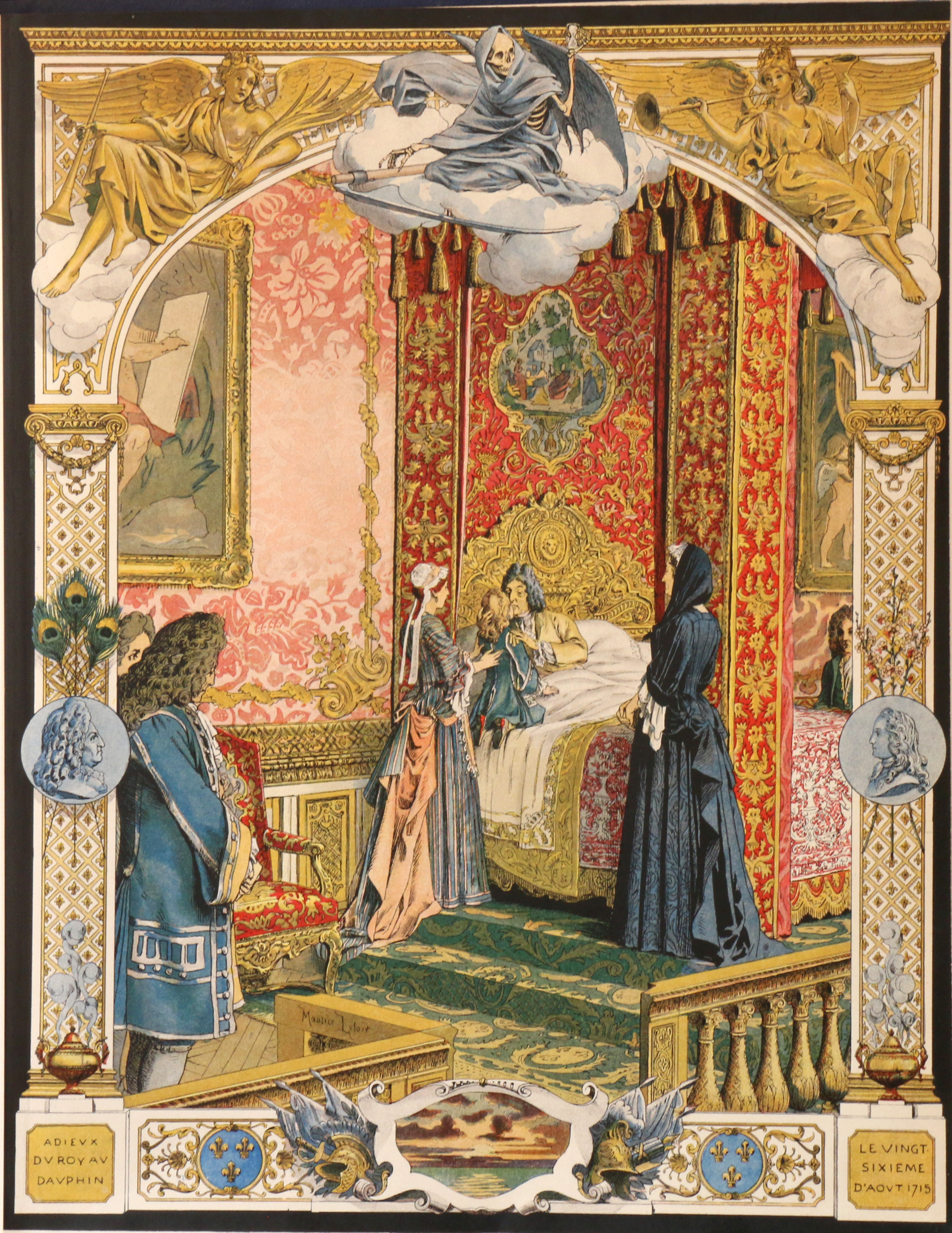
Louis XV blessed by Louis XIV dying
La dame de Monsoreau

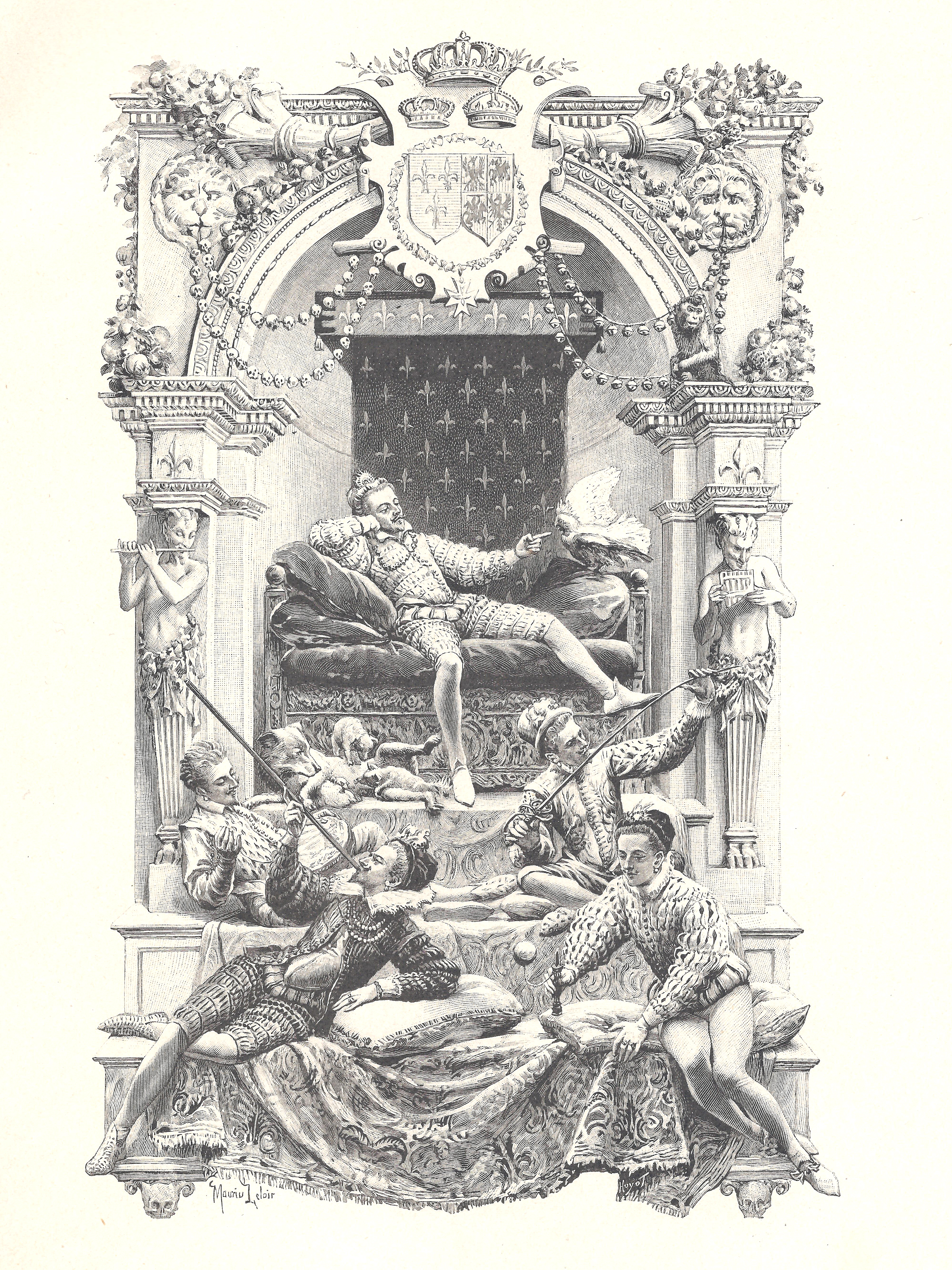
The very Christian King Henry III and his friends

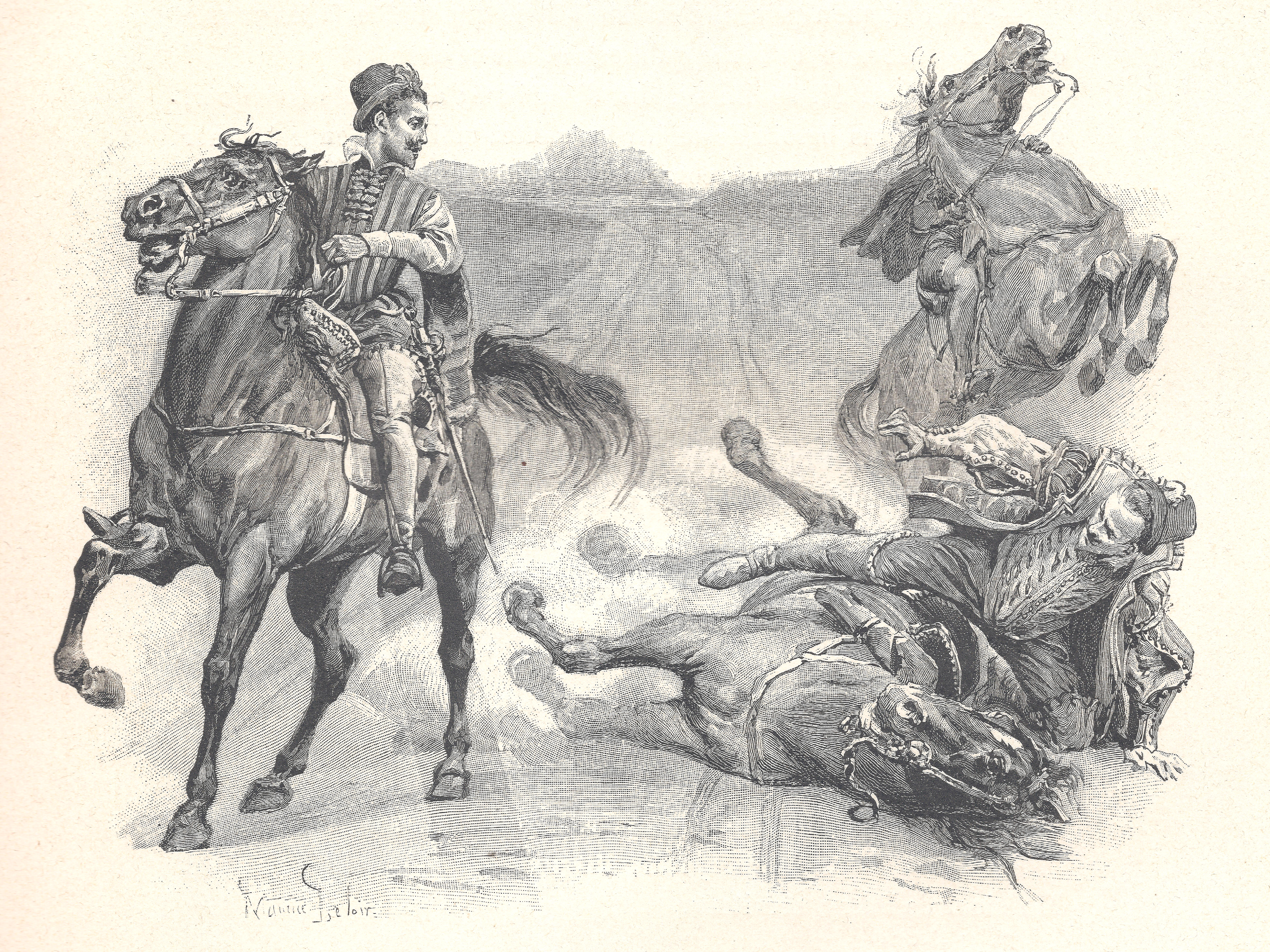
A rider fall

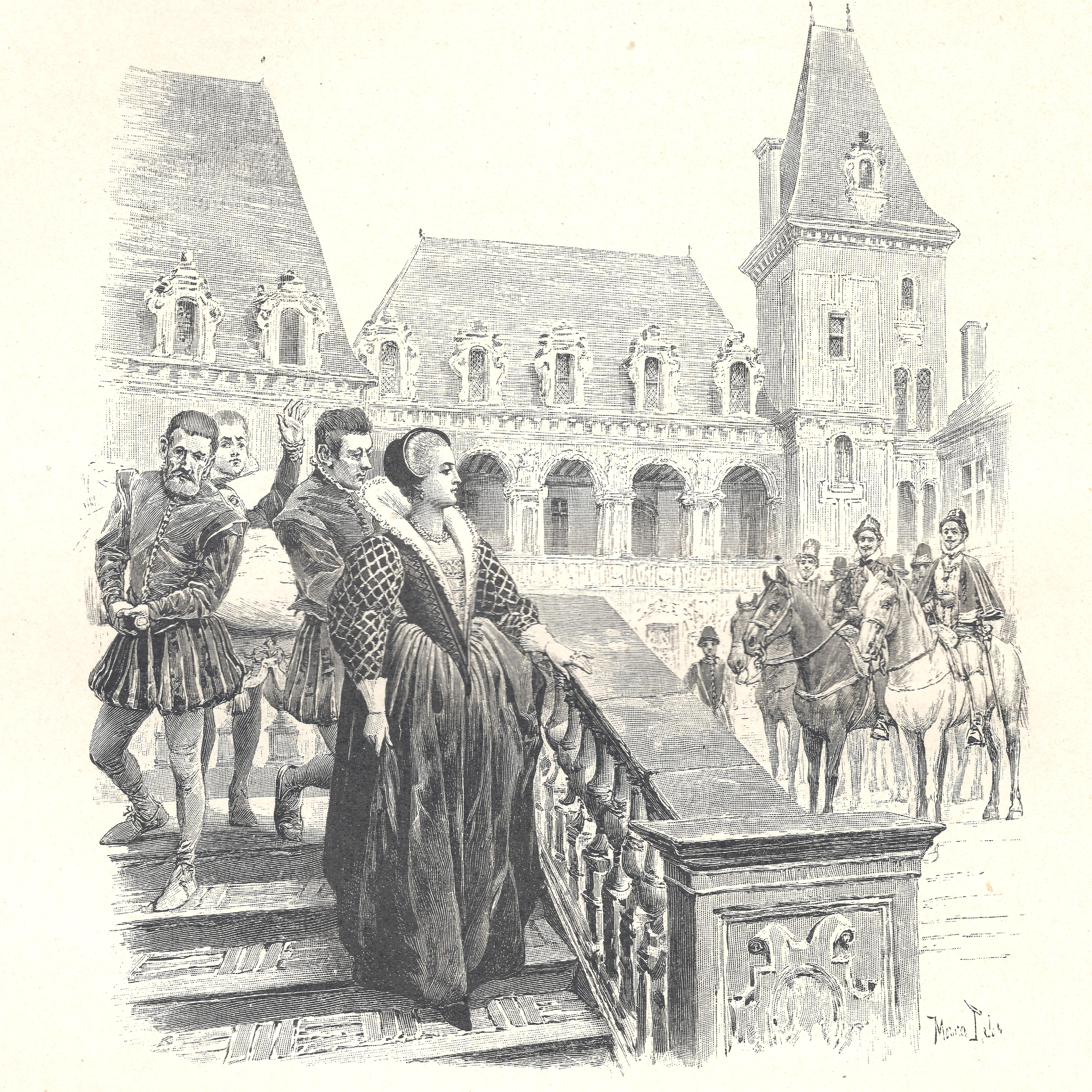
House

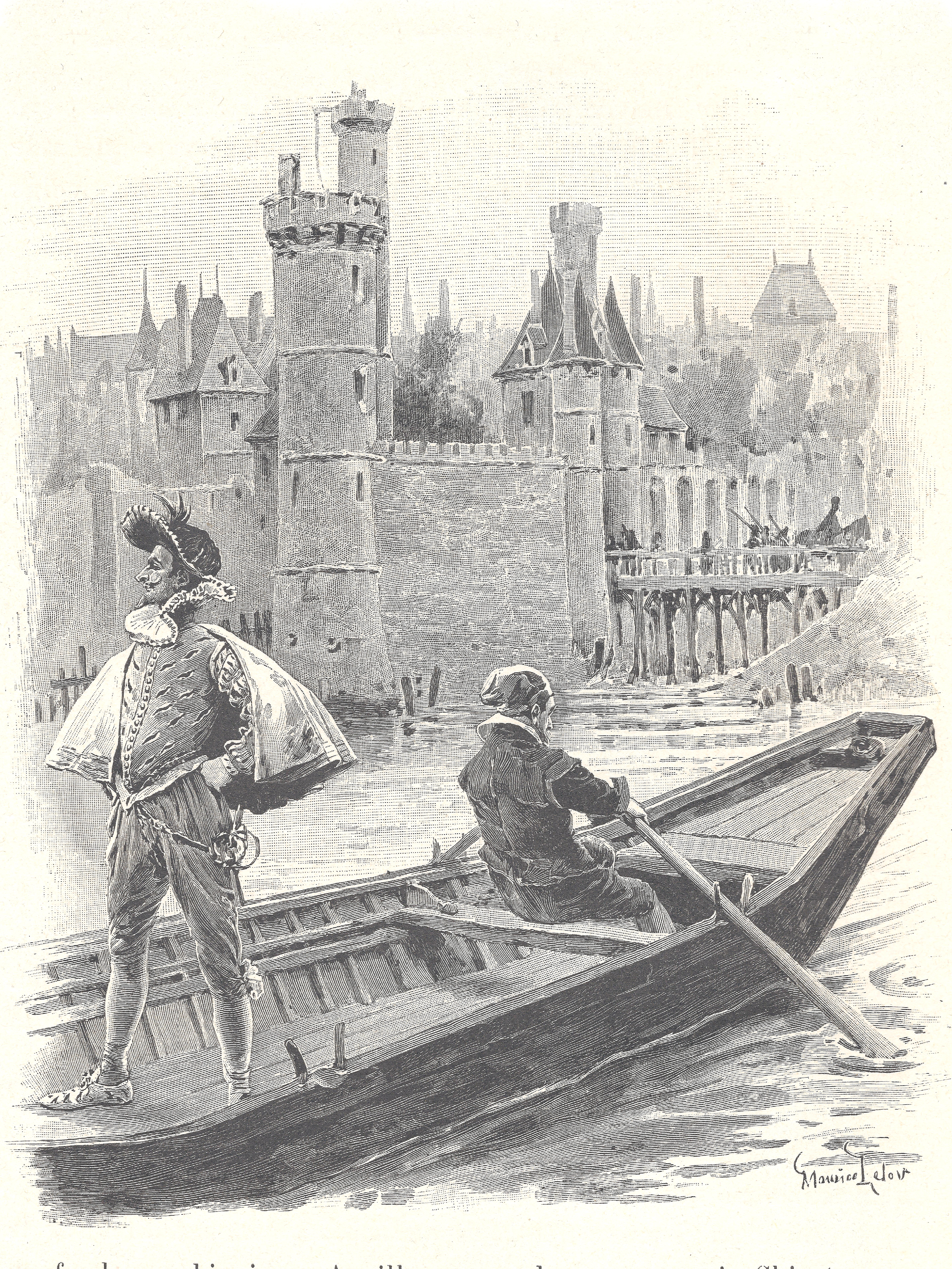
Passage of the Seine at the ferry of Nesle.

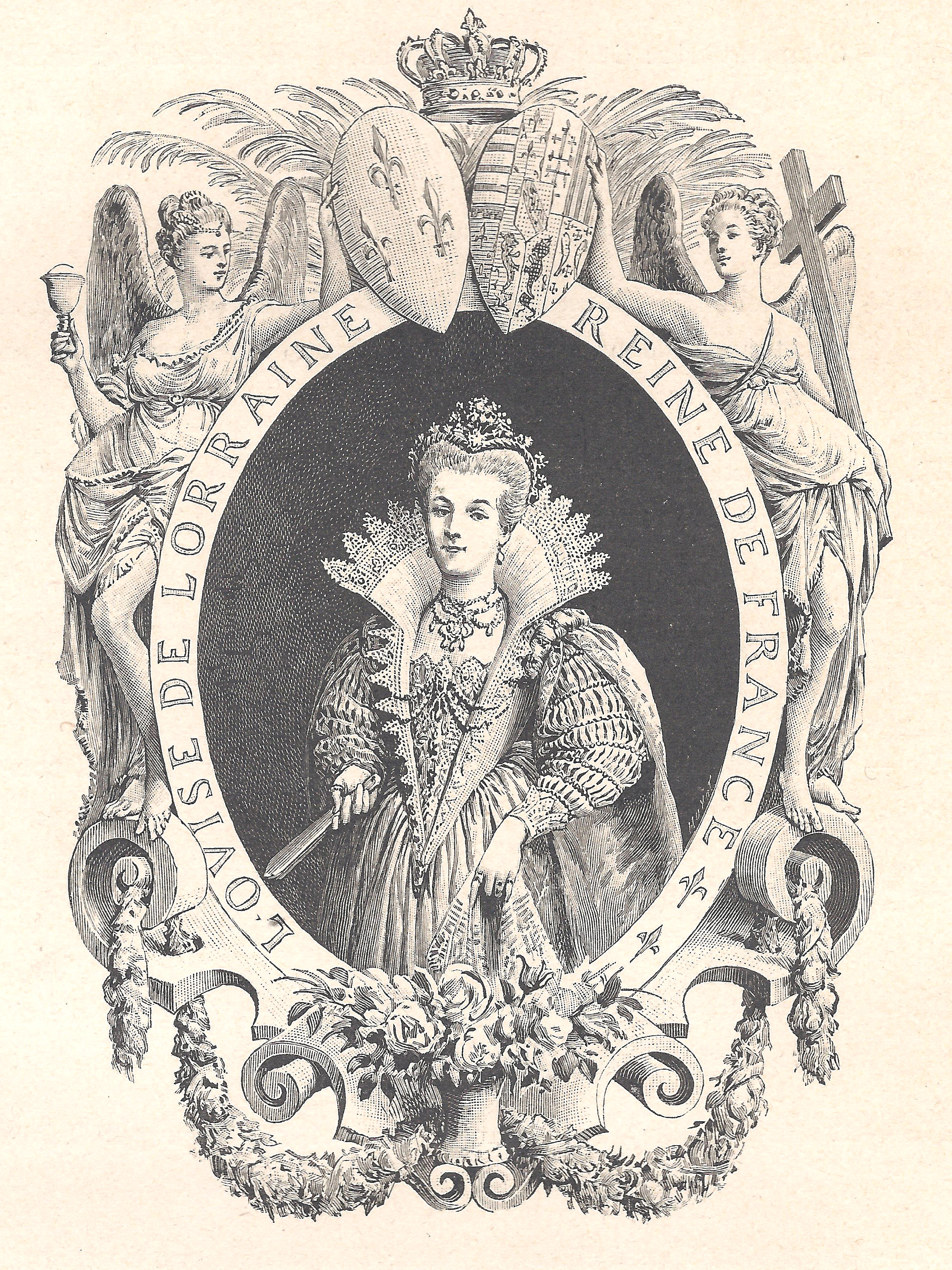
Louise de Lorraine, Queen of France
