= Héloïse Colin =

French painter

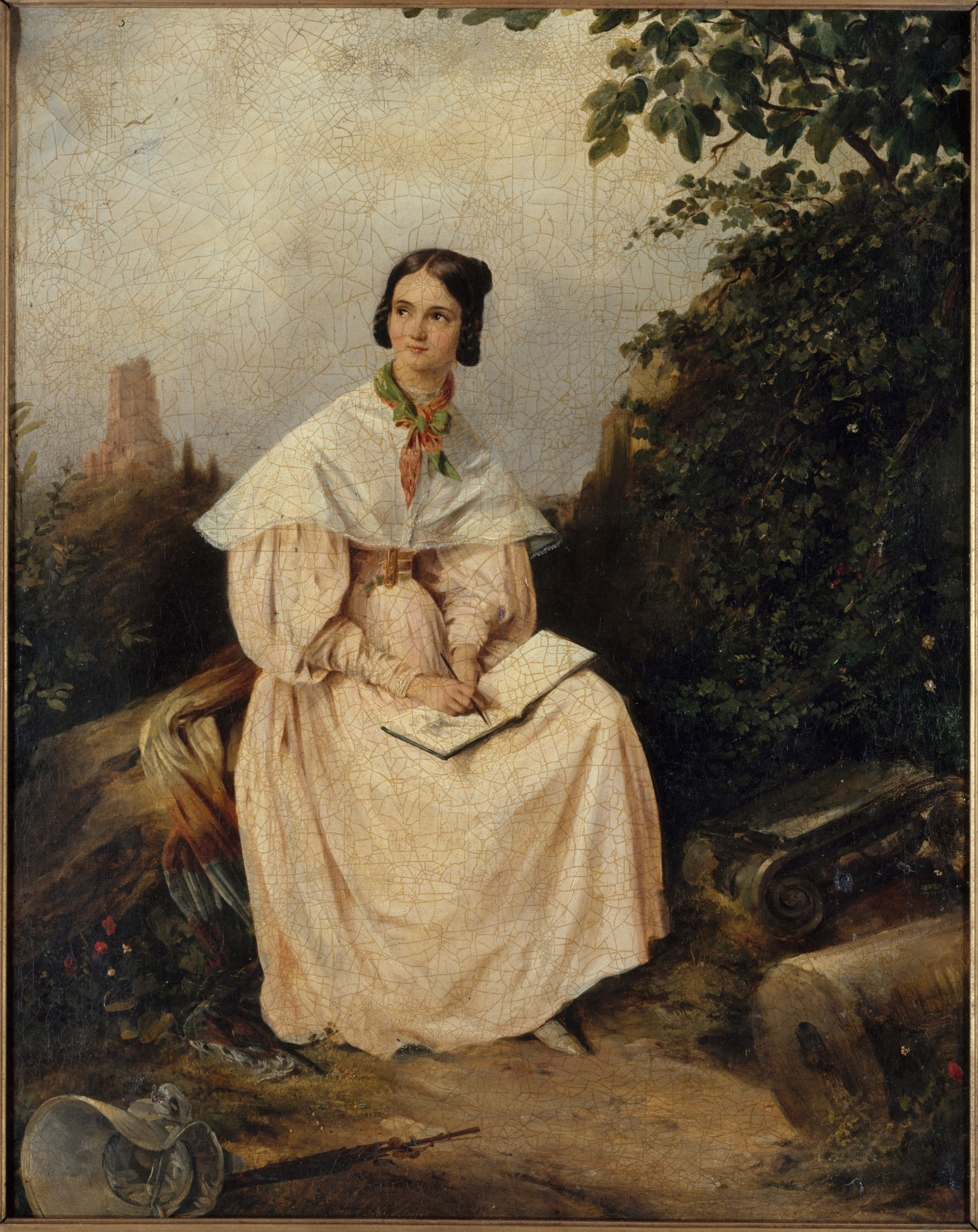
Portrait of Héloïse Colin by Alexandre-Marie Colin, 1836 (musée Carnavalet)

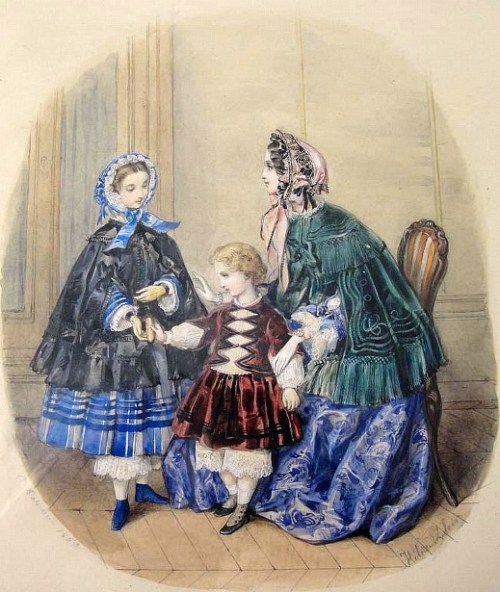
Héloïse Colin: Mère et deux enfants

Héloïse Suzanne Colin (1819–1873), also known as Héloïse Leloir, was a painter and fashion illustrator during the Second French Empire.

== Biography ==
Héloïse Colin was the eldest daughter of painter Alexandre-Marie Colin and Marie Joseph Juhel. She married Auguste Leloir with whom she had two sons: the illustrator Maurice Leloir and the painter Alexandre-Louis Leloir.

Colin exhibited her first drawings in the 1835 edition of the Salon. She painted watercolors, miniatures, and illustrations for novels, such as The Three Musketeers and The Count of Monte Cristo. However, she and her sisters Anaïs Toudouze and Laure Noël were best known for their work as illustrators of Parisian fashion of the mid-nineteenth, such as in the famous fashion magazine La Mode Illustrée.
