= Adele-Anaïs Toudouze =

Ukraine-born French fashion plate illustrator

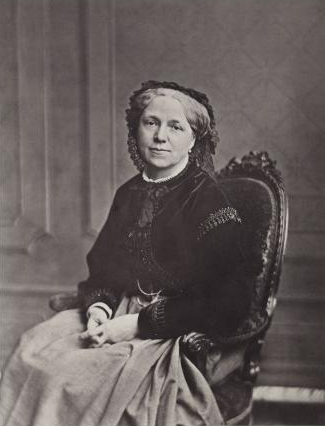
Photograph portrait of Anaïs Toudouze by Paul Berthier

Anaïs Toudouze (née Adèle-Anaïs Colin; 1822–1899) was a French fashion plate illustrator, born in Ukraine. She was born to a painter and lithographer, Alexandre-Marie Colin and his wife, who was also a painter.

== Biography ==
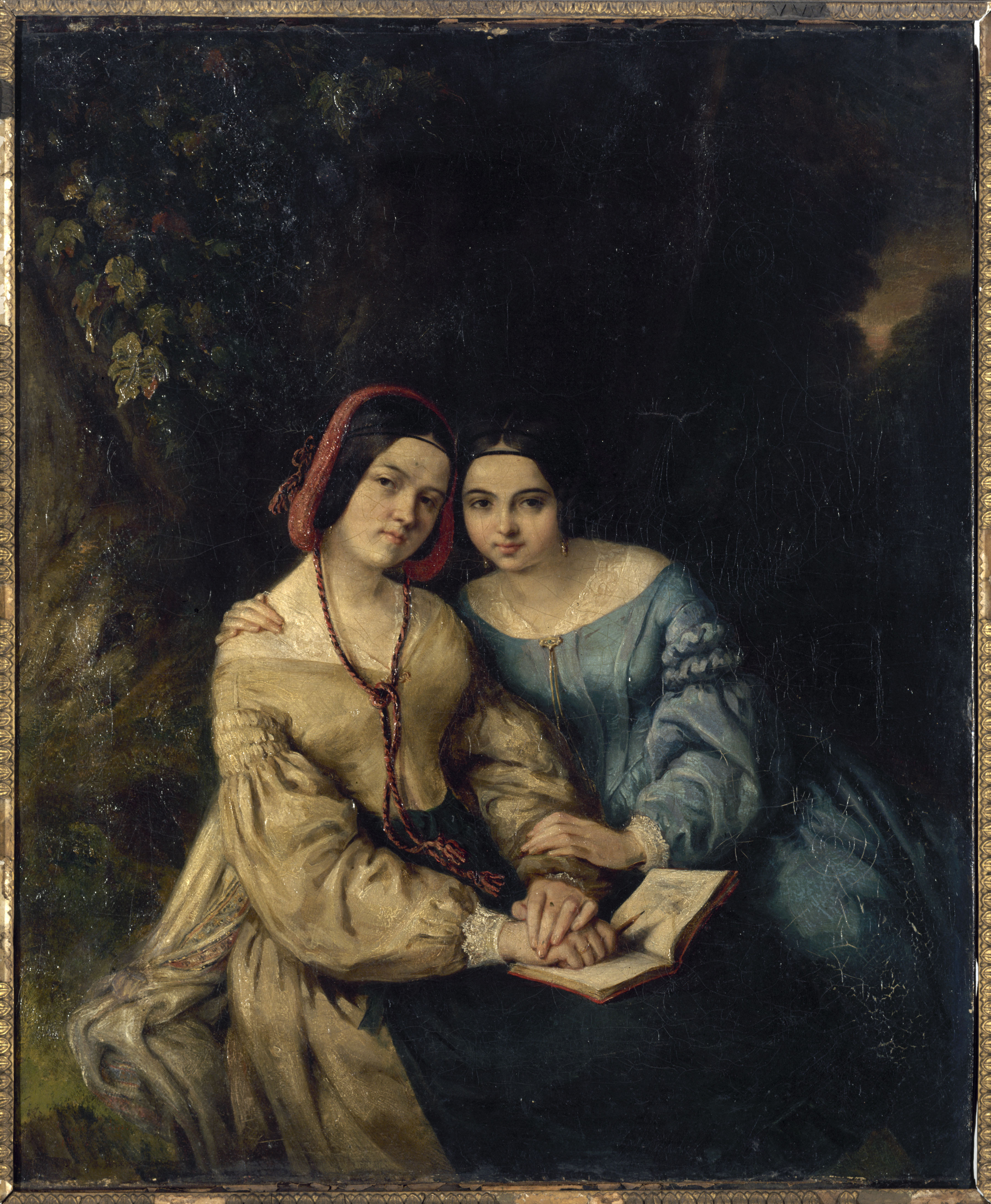
Self-portrait of Héloïse and Anaïs Colin, 1836. Each of the sisters painted the portrait of the other.

Anaïs was the second oldest sister of the Colin family. She had an older sister, Héloïse, and two younger sisters, Laure and Isabelle. All of the siblings were artists and Héloïse and Anaïs worked closely together on many projects for fashion plate illustrations and had similar styles. They came from a long line of ancestors that were also artists including, Jean-Baptise Greuze. The daughters learned skills from their father instead of attending an academy.

Anaïs' father was a supporter of the Romantic movement and close friends to Eugène Delacroix, Théodore Gericault, and Paul Gavarni. This sparked Anaïs' interest in the Romantic movement as well, and she followed her father's footsteps in joining that style for her artwork. Her father had a studio called Pére in the "center of the artistic activity in Paris." This kept the girls very involved and immersed in the art world. Each of the girls won awards and medals at the Salon between the ages of 14 and 20. Their paintings and illustrations were admired by viewers. Unlike other female artists during this time, the Colin sisters did not keep to historical or religious themes that were considered high art, and were encouraged by their father to learn proper techniques although they did not receive official academic training.

Anaïs went to marry an architect and aquafortist engraver named Gabriel Toudouze in 1845. They were only married for 9 years before he died in 1854, leaving Anaïs to take care of their three young children. To provide for her family, Anaïs worked and produced many fashion illustration plates for fashion magazines, journals, and books.

Anaïs' daughter, Isabelle, followed in her mother's footsteps and became a fashion illustrator and painter. Her oldest son Gustave became a novelist, and his son Georges-Gustave wrote a book about his family's fashion illustration and artistic history titled, Le Costume françois. Her second son also Edouard became a painter. Anaïs died in 1899.

== Professional work ==
Anaïs worked for over 35 fashion publications during her career. Fashion magazines became hugely popular from 1830 to 1870, providing ample work for female illustrators. She did the majority of her work for the fashion magazine in France called La Mode Illustrée. La Mode was distributed weekly and highlighted Victorian fashion trends of the time including accessories to go with the piece. All of the prints for the magazine were hand-colored and inserted with text descriptions explaining the fashions being showcased. Anaïs did not only illustrate for French fashion publications, she also illustrated for British fashion journals such as La Belle Assemblee, The Queen (which was equivalent to today's Vogue), and Englishwoman's Domestic Magazine. Additionally, she illustrated books, depicting leisure and historical romantic scenes. Her main competitor who also did fashion plates was Jules David, a painter and lithographer who worked with Adolphe Goubaud, a publisher.

When fashion plates became a popular form of illustration this provided a way for Anaïs's work to be mass-produced. Instead of making the illustrator redraw the same exact image over and over, the artist would either etch, engrave, or lithograph the image and then color it in by hand. This form of production was much more efficient and realistic to produce fashion magazines at the weekly rate they were being printed. The figures being depicted in fashion plates were often very stiff and placed in positions that displayed the fashions best. One of the downsides to fashion plates are that they did not show three-dimensional perspectives. Anaïs ended up having a slightly more successful career than her sister Héloïse due to the fact she lived longer and had a larger collection of work. Museums like The Metropolitan Museum of Art carry a collection of her prints while others are still around for sale.

== Principal works ==
- The Colin Family (1834-1835), watercolor by Anaïs and Héloïse Colin, Musee de la Mode et du Costume.
- A Girl and Her Cat, graphite pencil on paper
- Portrait d'une dame portant une robe à crinoline, watercolor
- Portrait of a young woman seated in a chair (1842–1842), watercolor

== Public collections ==
- The Metropolitan Museum of Art.
  - La Saison (1868)
  - Study: Two Women in an Evening Dress (1860)
  - Fashion Illustration, from La Mode Illustrée, no. 28 (1886).
  - Fashion plate, from Le Conseiller des Dames et de Demoiselles (1859)
  - A Lady in a Hunting Costume with a Lady in Walking Costume on a Mountain Path from La Mode Illustrée (1881).
  - Toilettes de Mme. L. Massieu, from La Mode Illustrée (1881).
- Museo del Prado
- Museum of Fine Art, Houston
- Virginia Museum of Fine Art
- National Portrait Gallery, London
