= Alexandre-Marie Colin =

French painter (1798–1875)

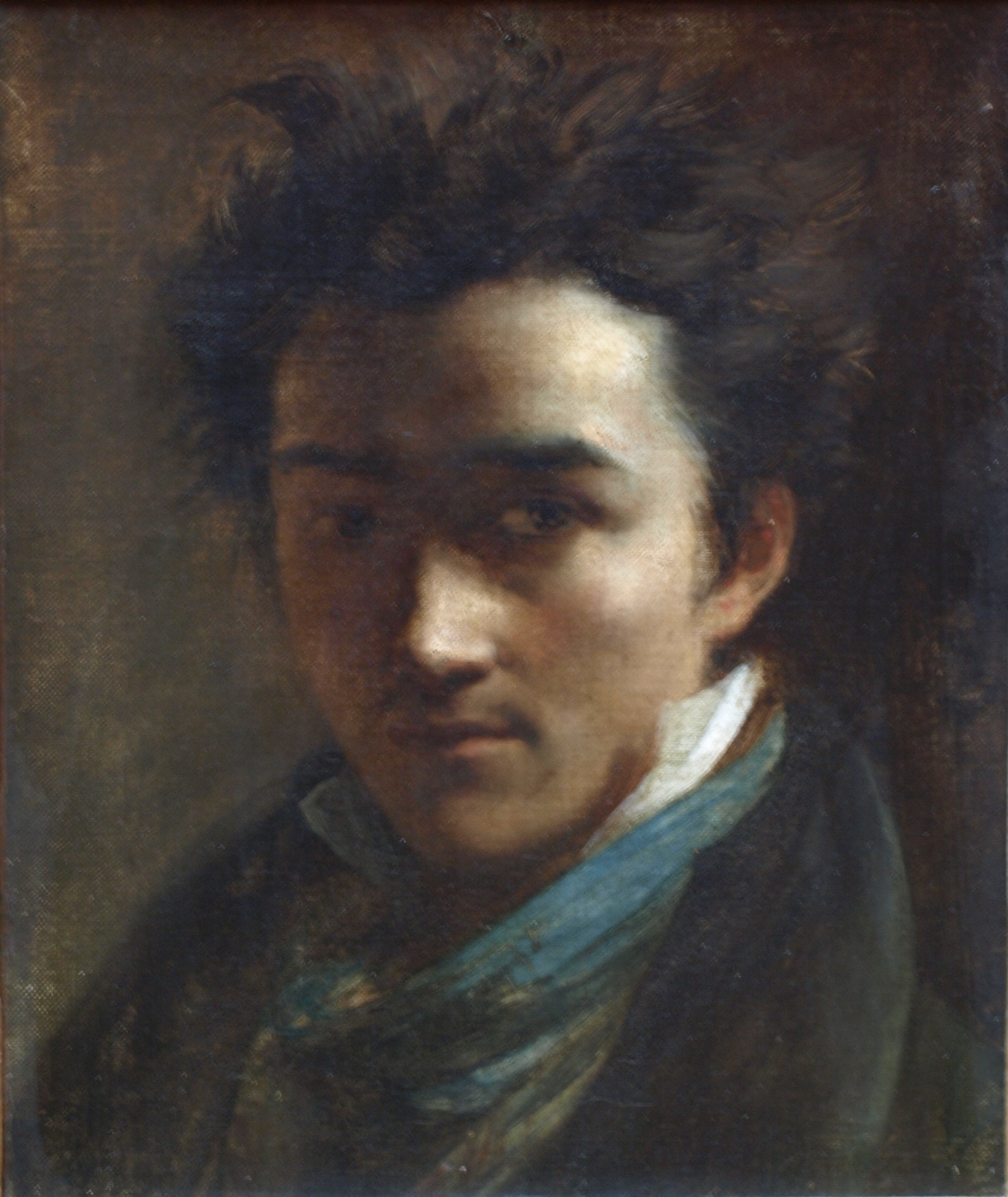
Presumably a self-portrait of Colin

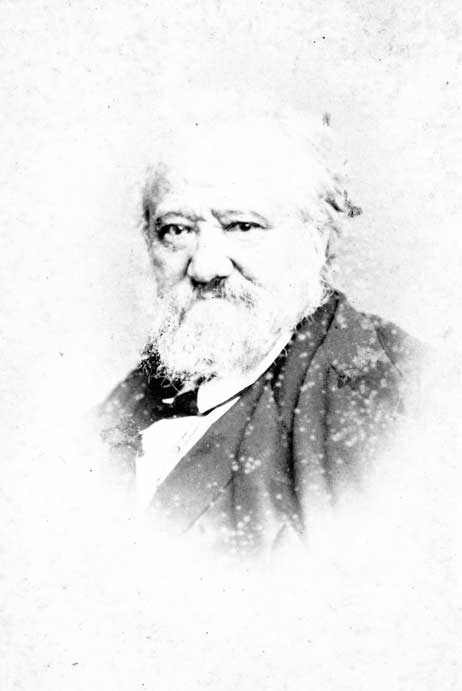
Photograph of Colin at a later age

Alexandre-Marie Colin (5 December 1798 – 21 November 1875) was a French painter of historical and genre subjects.

== Biography ==
Colin was born in Paris in 1798. He was a pupil of Girodet and close friend of Eugène Delacroix, Achille Devéria, and others. He and Delacroix shared a studio during the 1820s and even lithographed each other's works. His religious and historical paintings are characterised by a style based on a careful study of the old masters, while his genre pieces are vigorous and lifelike. Among the latter may be noticed his French Fish-Market (1832) in the Alte Nationalgalerie in Berlin, and his Gipsies Resting. Among the former may be named Christopher Columbus, Flight into Egypt, and Assumption of the Virgin. He also illustrated scenes for literary works, such as Shakespeare's Othello and Macbeth. Colin had four children with two wives: Anaïs, Héloïse, Laure, and Paul, all of whom followed in his footsteps as painters. He gradually modified his style during his long career, making it acceptable to salon juries who rejected several early works from the 1820s because of the very painterly qualities we admire today.

He died in 1875.

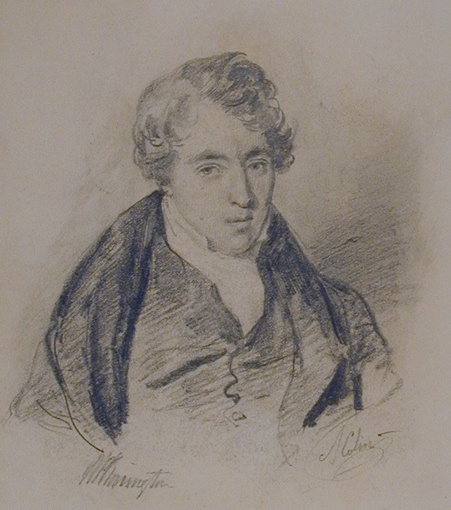
Portrait of Richard Parkes Bonington, now in the Ashmolean Museum

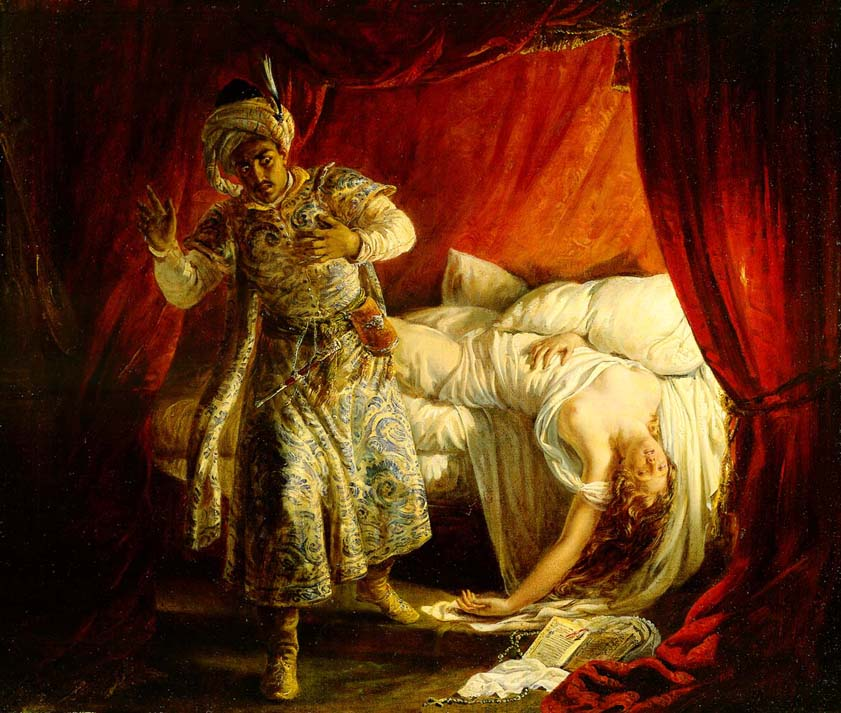
Othello and Desdemona, 1829

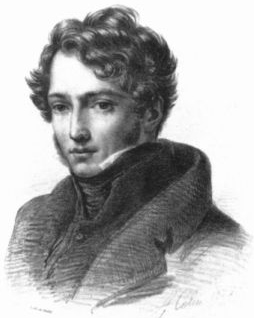
Portrait of Théodore Géricault, 1816
