= Epes Sargent (landowner) =

American landowner, judge, and politician (1690–1762)

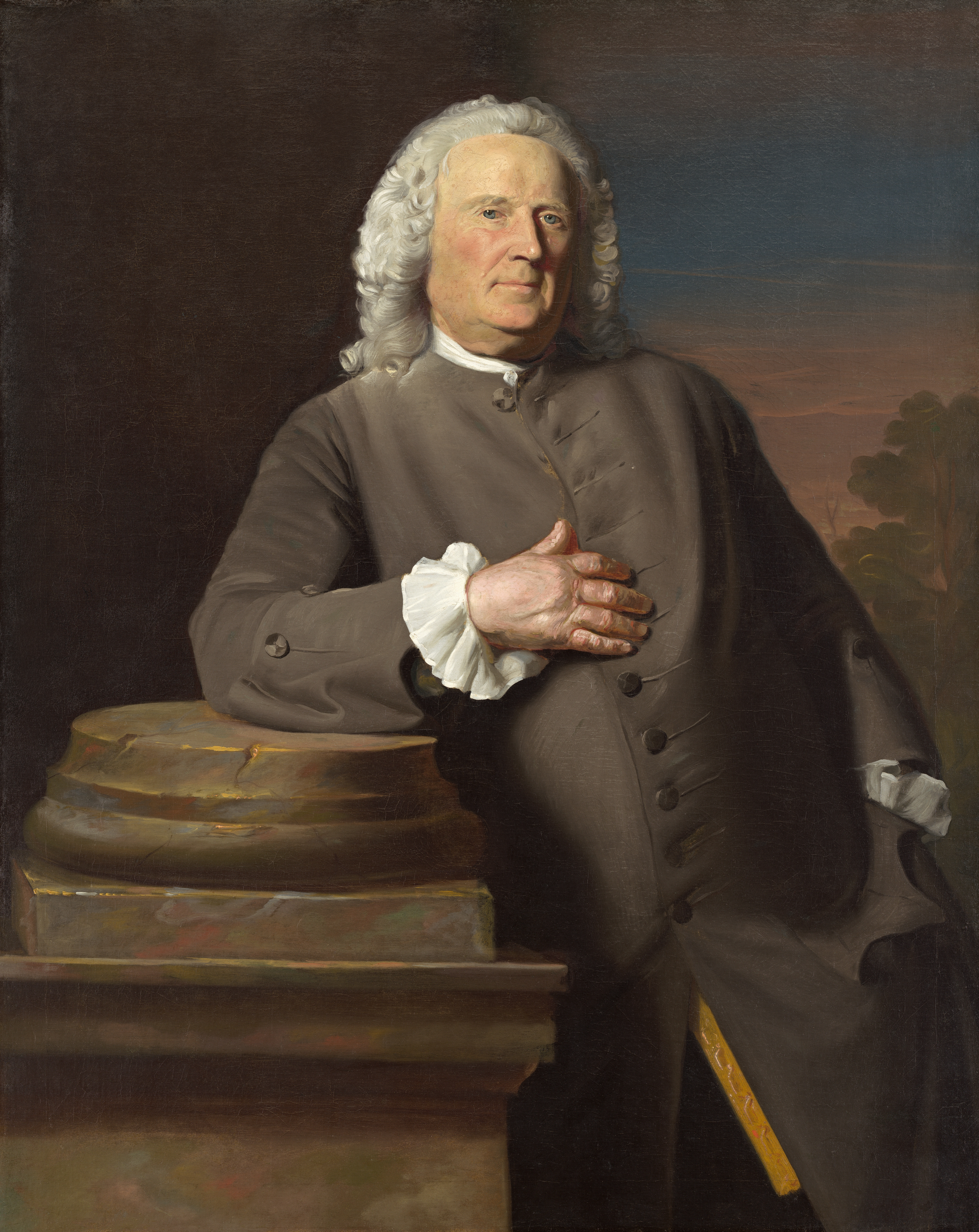
- Portrait by John Singleton Copley, 1760

Representative of the General Court of Massachusetts
- In office 1744–1744

Personal details
- Born: 12 July 1690 Gloucester, Massachusetts
- Died: 6 December 1762 (aged 72) Salem, Massachusetts
- Spouses: Esther McCarty (m. 1720; died 1743) Catherine Winthrop (m. 1744)
- Relations: Daniel Sargent (grandson); Henry Sargent (grandson); Lucius Manlius Sargent (grandson); Judith Sargent (granddaughter); Winthrop Sargent (grandson); William Sargent (grandson); John Sargent (grandson); Winthrop Sargent (grandson)
- Children: 16, including Daniel, Paul, John
- Parent(s): William Sargent; Mary Duncan

Colonel Epes Sargent (July 12, 1690 – December 6, 1762) was an American landowner, militia officer, judge, and politician from Gloucester, Massachusetts.

== Early life and family ==
Sargent was born on July 12, 1690, in Gloucester, Massachusetts. He was the seventh of fifteen children born to William Sargent II (1659–1707), who came to Gloucester before 1678, and Mary Duncan (died 1724), daughter of Peter Duncan and step-granddaughter of Samuel Symonds, deputy Governor.

His maternal grandparents were Mary Eppes (1629–1692) and Peter Duncan (1629–1716), who emigrated from England to Massachusetts. His paternal grandfather was William Sargent (born c. 1610) from Exeter, England.

== Career ==
Sargent was one of the largest landholders in Gloucester. He served as a colonel in the Massachusetts militia before the Revolutionary War and was a justice of the general session court for more than thirty years.

In 1744, he was selected as Gloucester's representative in the General Court of Massachusetts.

In 1760, two years before his death, he had his portrait painted by John Singleton Copley.

== Personal life ==
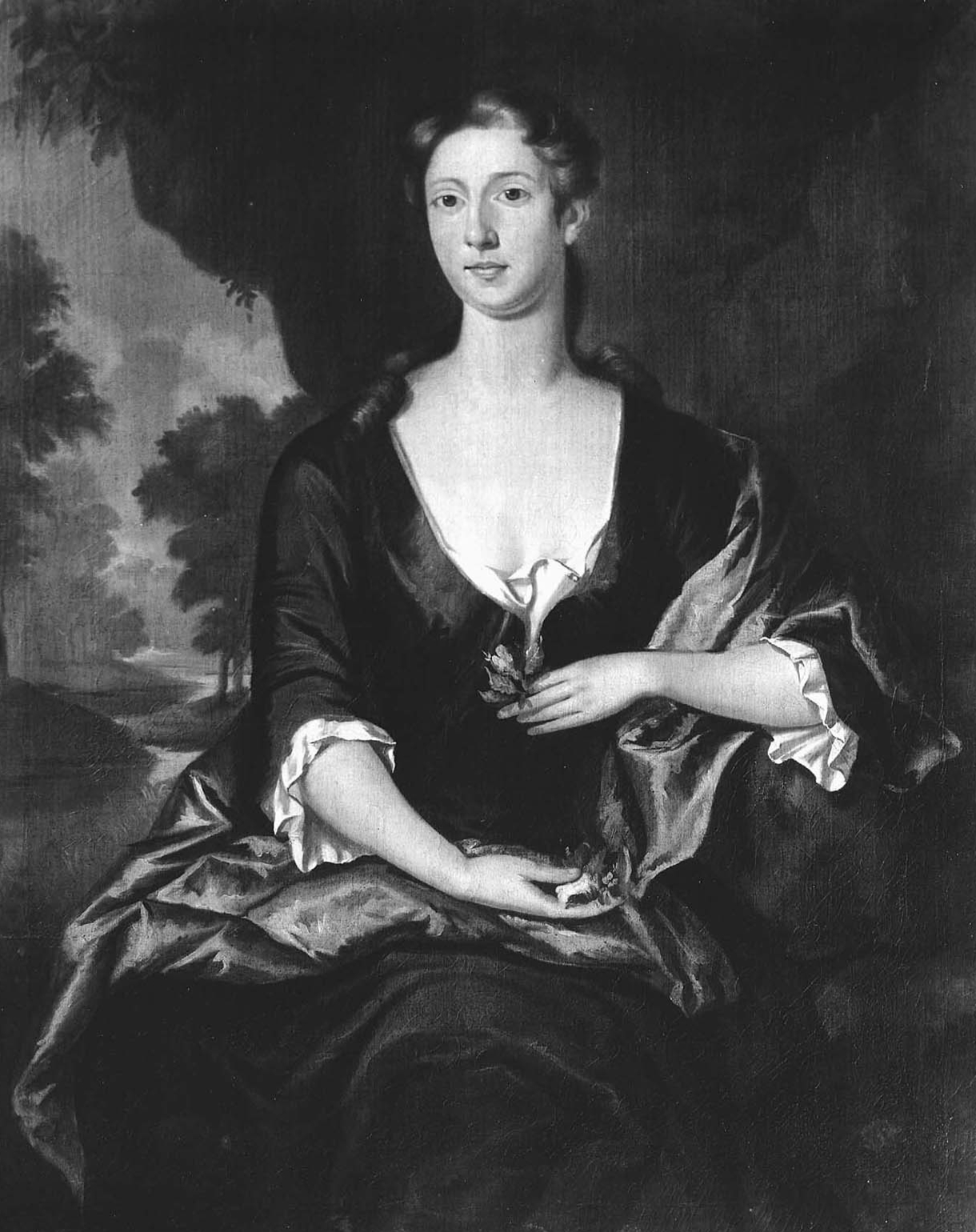
Catherine Winthrop Sargent, second wife of Col. Sargent, from a portrait by Smybert which is in the Museum of Fine Arts, Boston.

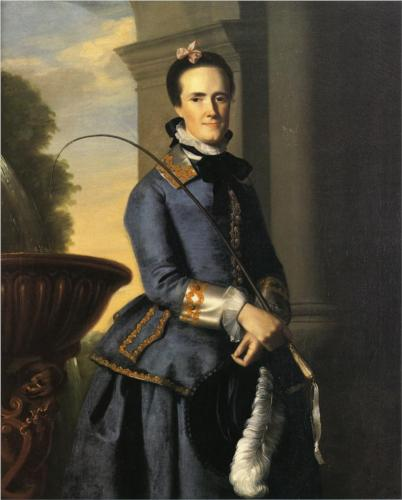
Mrs. Epes Sargent II by John Singleton Copley 1764

On April 1, 1720, he married Esther McCarty (1701–1743), daughter of Florence McCarty, one of the founders of the first Protestant Episcopal society in New England. Before Esther's death, she gave birth to:

- Epes Sargent (1721–1779), who married Catherine Osborne (1722–1788), daughter of Hon. John Osborne. He was the great-grandfather of Epes Sargent (1813–1880).
- Esther Sargent (1722–1745), who married Col. Thomas Goldthwaite (1718–1799).
- Ignatius Sargent (b. 1724).
- Thomas Sargent (1726–1727), who died young.
- Winthrop Sargent (1727–1793), who married Judith Saunders (1731–1793).
- Sara Sargent (1729–1792).
- Daniel Sargent Sr. (1730–1806), a successful merchant who was referred to as the "merchant prince". He married Mary Turner (1743–1813).
- William Sargent (1733–1736), who died young.
- Benjamin Sargent (b. 1736).
- Mary Ann Sargent (b. 1740), who died in infancy.

After Esther's death, Epes Sargent married Catherine (née Winthrop) Brown (1711–1781), the widow of Samuel Brown and the daughter of Ann Dudley and John Winthrop (1681–1747), on August 10, 1744, and moved to Salem, Massachusetts. Catherine's maternal grandfather was Gov. Joseph Dudley and her paternal grandfather was Wait Winthrop, son of Gov. John Winthrop the Younger and grandson of Gov. John Winthrop, both Governors of the Massachusetts Bay Colony. Together, they were the parents of:

- Paul Dudley Sargent (1745–1828), a noted Revolutionary War hero.
- Ann Sargent (1746–1747), who died in infancy.
- John Sargent (1750–1824), a Loyalist during the Revolution.

Sargent died on December 6, 1762, in Salem and his remains were removed to Gloucester for burial.

=== Descendants ===
His grandchildren included Daniel Sargent (1764–1842), a politician who was close friends with President John Quincy Adams, Henry Sargent (1770–1845), a painter, Lucius Manlius Sargent (1786–1867), a temperance advocate, Judith Sargent Murray (1751–1820), a poet and advocate for women's rights, and Winthrop Sargent (1753–1820), Governor of the Mississippi Territory.

The artist John Singer Sargent is a descendant of Epes's son Winthrop.

== See also ==
- Sargent family
