= John Sargent (Loyalist) =

American loyalist (1750-1824)

Member of the Nova Scotia House of Assembly
- In office 1793–1818
- Preceded by: Joseph Aplin
- Succeeded by: William Browne Sargent

Personal details
- Born: 24 December 1750 Salem, Massachusetts
- Died: 24 January 1824 (aged 73) Barrington, Nova Scotia
- Spouse: Margaret Whitney Barnard (after 1784)
- Relations: Daniel Sargent Sr. (brother); Paul Dudley Sargent (brother); Dudley Saltonstall (cousin)
- Children: 4, including William, John, Winthrop
- Parent(s): Epes Sargent; Catherine Winthrop

John Sargent (24 December 1750 – 24 January 1824) was an American Loyalist during the American Revolution. He was exiled to Canada where he subsequently became a politician.

== Early life ==
Sargent was born in Salem, Massachusetts on 24 December 1750. He was the second son of Colonel Epes Sargent, by his second wife, the widow Catharine Browne. He was a younger brother to Paul Dudley Sargent, a distinguished Revolutionary War soldier, and the younger half-brother to Winthrop Sargent (1727–1793) and Daniel Sargent Sr. (1730–1806), a prominent merchant.

His maternal grandparents were Ann Dudley, daughter of Joseph Dudley, and John Winthrop (1681–1747), son of Wait Winthrop, grandson of John Winthrop the Younger and great-grandson of John Winthrop, Governor of the Massachusetts Bay Colony. Sargent's paternal ancestor, William, came to America from Gloucester, England, before 1678. Among his first cousins was Dudley Saltonstall, a notorious Revolutionary War naval commander. Through his brother Winthrop, he was uncle to Winthrop Sargent (1753–1820), a major in the Continental Army who was appointed the first Governor of the Mississippi Territory by president John Adams, and Judith Sargent Murray, an early American advocate for women's rights, essayist, playwright, poet, and letter writer. Through his brother Daniel, he was an uncle to Lucius Manlius Sargent, the author, antiquarian, and temperance advocate, Henry Sargent, the artist who was the father of Henry Winthrop Sargent, the prominent horticulturist, and merchant prince Daniel Sargent of Boston.

== Career ==
Sargent, a Methodist merchant, was the very first signatory among the Salem Addressers of Governor Thomas Gage on his arrival in Salem in 1774, and thus during the American Revolution he was proscribed and exiled in the Banishment Act of the State of Massachusetts in 1778.

Following his exile, he went to Barrington Township, Nova Scotia, where he attended the 7th, 8th, 9th and 10th General Assemblies of Nova Scotia.

== Personal life ==
In 1784, Sargent married widow Margaret (née Whitney) Barnard in Boston. Together, they were the parents of three sons, all of whom also served in the Assembly, and a daughter, born in Nova Scotia:

- William Browne Sargent (1787–1853), who married Elizabeth Burbridge in 1819.
- John Sargent (1792–1874), who married Sarah Wright Doane in 1818.
- Winthrop Sargent (1794–1866), who married Mary Jane Allison (1798–1867) in 1819.

Sargent died in Barrington at the age of 73.
