= John Sargent =

John Sargent may refer to:

== Politicians ==
- John Sargent (politician, born 1714) (1714–1791), British Member of Parliament for West Looe and Midhurst
- John Sargent (politician, born 1749) (1749–1831), British Member of Parliament for Seaford, Bodmin and Queenborough
- John Sargent (merchant) (1792–1874), Canadian merchant, farmer and politician in Nova Scotia
- John Sargent (American politician) (1799–1880), American politician in Massachusetts

== Others ==
- John Sargent (Loyalist) (1750–1824), loyalist officer during the American Revolution
- John Sargent (priest) (1780–1833), English clergyman, son of the MP for Seaford
- John G. Sargent (1860–1939), U.S. Attorney General
- John Singer Sargent (1856–1925), American portrait artist
- John Turner Sargent Sr. (1924–2012), president and CEO of the Doubleday and Company publishing house
- John Turner Sargent (born c. 1956), American publisher, CEO of Macmillan and Executive Vice President of the Holtzbrinck Publishing Group
- John Neptune Sargent (1826–1893), commander of British troops in China, Hong Kong and the Straits Settlements
- John Sargent, alter ego of fictional DC Comics character Sargon the Sorcerer c. 1941

== See also ==
- John Sergeant (disambiguation)
