= Daniel Sargent =

Daniel Sargent may refer to:

- Daniel Sargent (politician) (1764–1842), American merchant and politician in Boston, Massachusetts
- Daniel Sargent Sr. (1730–1806), his father, American merchant in Massachusetts
- Daniel Wycliffe Sargent (1850–1902), British explorer of Africa
- Daniel Sargent (judoka), British judoka
