= Paul Dudley Sargent =

American soldier (1745-1828)

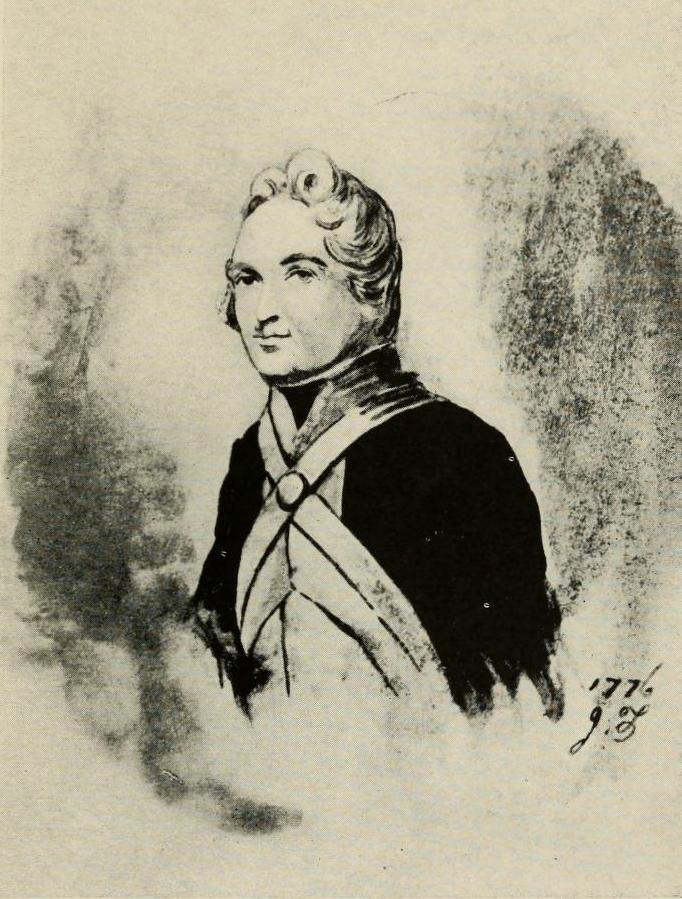
- Born: 23 June 1745; Salem, Massachusetts
- Died: 28 September 1828 (aged 83); Sullivan, Maine
- Spouse: Lucy Smith Sanders
- Parent(s): Epes Sargent; Catherine Winthrop
- Relatives: Daniel Sargent Sr. (brother); John Sargent (brother); Dudley Saltonstall (cousin)

Paul Dudley Sargent (Baptized June 23, 1745, Salem, Massachusetts – September 28, 1828 Sullivan, Maine) was a privateer and soldier in the Continental Army during the American Revolutionary War.

== Early life ==
Sargent was born in 1745 and baptized on June 23, 1745, in Salem, Massachusetts. He was the son of Katherine Winthrop (1711–1781), a widow of Samuel Brown and the second wife of his father, Epes Sargent. His father was one of the largest landholders in Gloucester and was a colonel of militia before the Revolution and a justice of the general session court for more than thirty years. His younger brother was John Sargent (1750–1824), was an exiled loyalist who became a lieutenant in the King's American Regiment, and his elder half-brothers included Winthrop Sargent (1727–1793) and Daniel Sargent Sr. (1730–1806), a prominent merchant.

As a first name, 'Winthrop' occurs frequently among descendants of Epes Sargent's first wife, Esther McCarty, though it was Colonel Sargent's mother Katharine Winthrop Browne who was descended from Governor Winthrop, not she. His maternal grandparents were Ann Dudley, daughter of Joseph Dudley, and John Winthrop (1681–1747), son of Wait Winthrop, grandson of John Winthrop the Younger and great-grandson of John Winthrop, Governor of the Massachusetts Bay Colony. Sargent's paternal ancestor, William, came to America from Gloucester, England, before 1678. Among his first cousins was Dudley Saltonstall, a notorious Revolutionary War naval commander. Through his brother Winthrop, he was uncle to Winthrop Sargent (1753–1820), a major in the Continental Army who was appointed the first Governor of the Mississippi Territory by president John Adams, and Judith Sargent Murray, an early American advocate for women's rights, essayist, playwright, poet, and letter writer. Through his brother Daniel, he was an uncle to Lucius Manlius Sargent, the author, antiquarian, and temperance advocate, Henry Sargent, the artist who was the father of Henry Winthrop Sargent, the prominent horticulturist, and merchant prince Daniel Sargent of Boston, paid the elderly Colonel Sargent's respects to his 'old fellow soldier' Gilbert du Motier, Marquis de Lafayette during the latter's visit to the United States in 1824. Their dates of service did not, in fact, overlap. The painter John Singer Sargent was descended from the first Winthrop Sargent's youngest son Fitzwilliam.

== Career ==
=== Revolutionary War service ===
Paul Dudley Sargent commanded a regiment at the Siege of Boston, was wounded at Bunker Hill, commanded a brigade in the summer of 1776, and fought at Harlem Heights, White Plains, Trenton, and Princeton. See the List of Continental Army units (1776) for information on Col. Sargent's regiment, the 16th Continental, (later designated the 8th Massachusetts), and the Massachusetts Line article for his earlier command of the 27th Massachusetts, disbanded after the Siege of Boston. For a time during the campaign in New York in '76 he was brevetted Brigadier General, having taken command of the regiments of Col.s Selden, Talcott & Ward in addition to his own. He and his regiment were among the force that famously crossed the Delaware with Washington on December 25, 1776.

Sargent also had interests as owner or bonder in numerous privateer vessels, on his own behalf and in partnership with James Swan, Mungo Mackay, Joseph Barrell and others. Among these was one of the largest privateers ever commissioned, the 300-ton three-decker Boston, formerly the British merchant ship Zachariah Bayley, captured by Sargent's much smaller privateer Yankee in 1776. Laden with supplies intended for the British army, the prize was significant enough to be the subject of congratulatory correspondence between Gen. Washington and John Hancock.

Though apparently separated from the Continental Army as of 1777 Sargent remained active in the Revolutionary cause, being commissioned Colonel of the 1st Regiment Essex County Massachusetts Militia, September 26, 1778.

=== Post-war occupations ===
After the war, ruined by shipping losses, Sargent withdrew to the hinterlands, serving as chief justice of the court of common pleas of Hancock County, Maine, its first judge of probate, first representative of the (pre-statehood) district to the Massachusetts General Court, postmaster, justice of the peace, and as one of the founding overseers of Bowdoin College.

It is unclear whether Sargent continued his privateering activities after the war, but he did engage in real estate speculation, successfully petitioning in 1784 to acquire an archipelago off the Maine coast including Rogues, later Roques Island, which some years afterwards was transferred to the Peabody family, whose descendants the Gardners still hold it. By 1788 he and his family had moved to Sullivan, on the mainland not far from Rogues. There is reason to suppose the departure from Boston for such a distant place may have been in part an attempt to evade creditors.

In 1803 Sargent played an inadvertent role in a test of the early republic's constitutionally mandated separation of powers, having been, along with William Vinal, the target of an effort by the Massachusetts General Court to strip him of his commission as Justice of the Peace for seeking to be reimbursed for expenses in amounts in excess of what was allowed. "It was urged in mitigation that the charges against the judges 'originated in party contention and personal revenge', and as Sargent's overcharge amounted to only $3.33 and Vinal's to only $9, the statement is probably true."

Since the assembly's action had removed the judges' powers without a hearing, it was felt by John Quincy Adams and Henry Knox, among others, that the future independence of the judiciary was threatened by the precedent. Both put their names to strongly worded protests.

Unlike many of his business partners and relatives, Sargent left no monument of domestic architecture by Charles Bulfinch or oil portrait by John Singleton Copley or Gilbert Stuart. However he did manage to raise a large number of educated and accomplished young men and women despite the remoteness and comparative poverty of his retirement. A well-stocked library, frequent extended stays with family in Boston and Salem, and much visiting back and forth with French revolutionary expatriates at nearby Fontaine Leval contributed to the cultivated atmosphere of the Sargent household, where Charles Maurice de Talleyrand-Périgord was a guest on at least one occasion.

Perhaps representative of Sargent's taste, or that of any man of his times and circle, is the silver service he commissioned from Paul Revere when in funds during 1781, the tea pot being the same type as that displayed in the famous portrait of its creator by Copley. His father Epes's bookplate, engraved by the same hand, is in the collection of the Boston Museum of Fine Arts, as is the Revere coffee pot, both displaying the Sargent coat of arms. His porcelain punchbowl resides in the Wilson Museum in Castine, Maine, donated by Blue Hill, Maine antiquarian and collector the late Roland Howard.

== Personal life ==
Col. Sargent's wife was Lucy Smith Sanders (often spelled 'Saunders', as it is pronounced) of the Salem mercantile family which gave its name to Sanders Theater in Harvard's Memorial Hall and whose members were among the first mansion-builders in Salem's Chestnut Street District. Like other branches of the family, the Sargents of Sullivan have many descendants.

His father died in Gloucester in 1762, two years after Copley painted the iconic portrait which hangs in the National Gallery in Washington, D.C.
