= Henry Winthrop Sargent =

American horticulturist and landscape architect

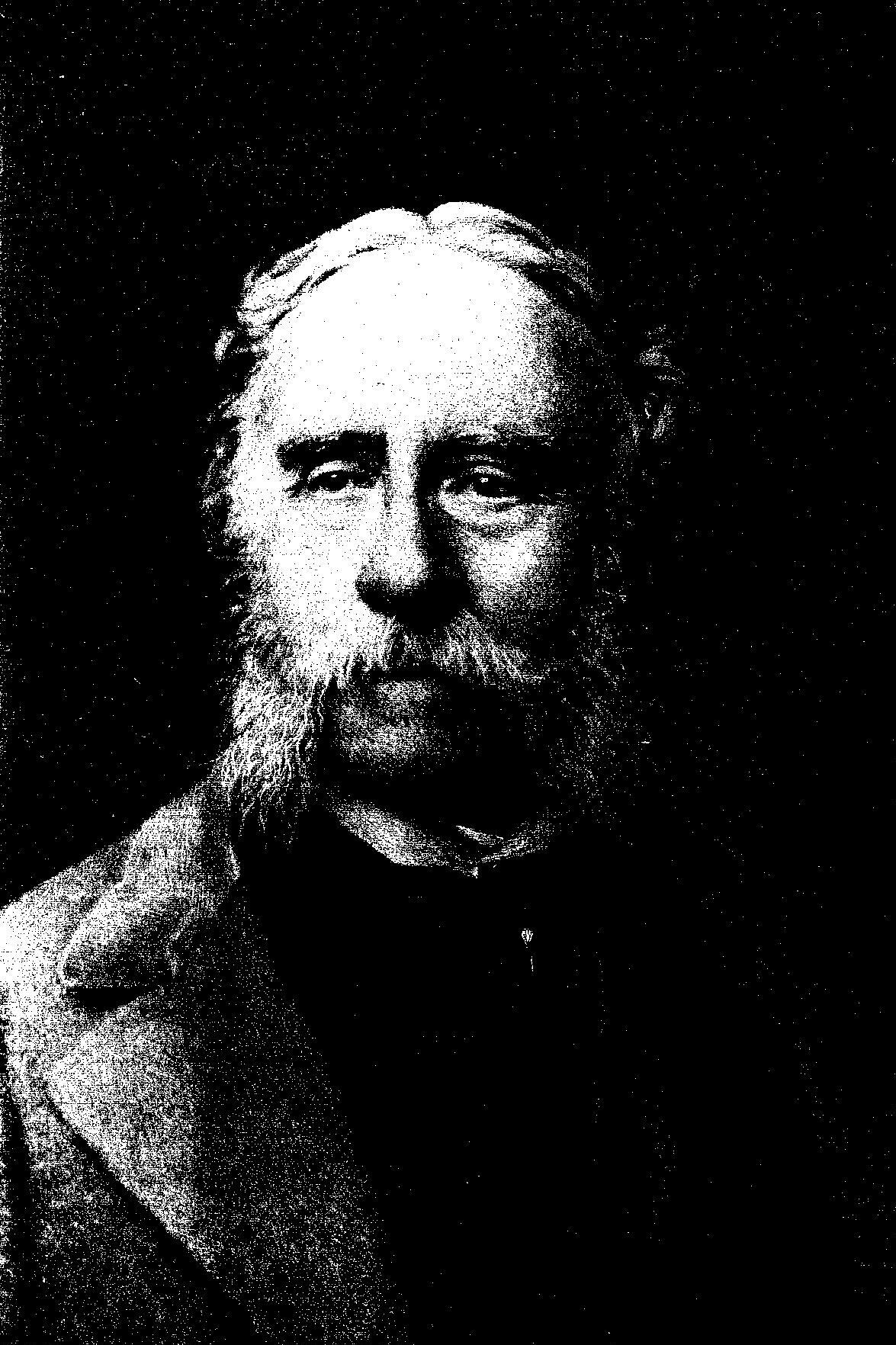
- Born: November 26, 1810; Boston, Massachusetts
- Died: November 11, 1882 (aged 71); Fishkill Landing, New York
- Education: Boston Latin School
- Alma mater: Harvard College
- Occupations: Horticulturist, landscape gardener
- Spouse: Caroline Olmsted (m. 1839)
- Children: 3
- Parent(s): Henry Sargent; Hannah Welles
- Relatives: Daniel Sargent (uncle); Lucius M. Sargent (uncle); Daniel Sargent Sr. (grandfather)

Henry Winthrop Sargent (November 26, 1810 – November 11, 1882), American horticulturist and landscape gardener.

== Early life ==
Henry Winthrop Sargent was born in Boston, the first child of Hannah (Welles) Sargent and artist Henry Sargent (1770–1845), formerly of Gloucester, Massachusetts. His younger brother, John Turner Welles Sargent (1814–1877), was married to Amelia Jackson Holmes (1843–1889), the only daughter of Oliver Wendell Holmes Sr.

He was the grandson of Daniel Sargent Sr. and Mary (née Turner) Sargent (1744–1813). He was the nephew of author Lucius Manlius Sargent (1786–1867), and merchant Daniel Sargent (1764–1842), who were cousins of American Revolutionary War soldier Paul Dudley Sargent (1745–1828).

Sargent was educated at the Boston Latin School and at Harvard College, where he graduated in the class of 1830.

== Career ==
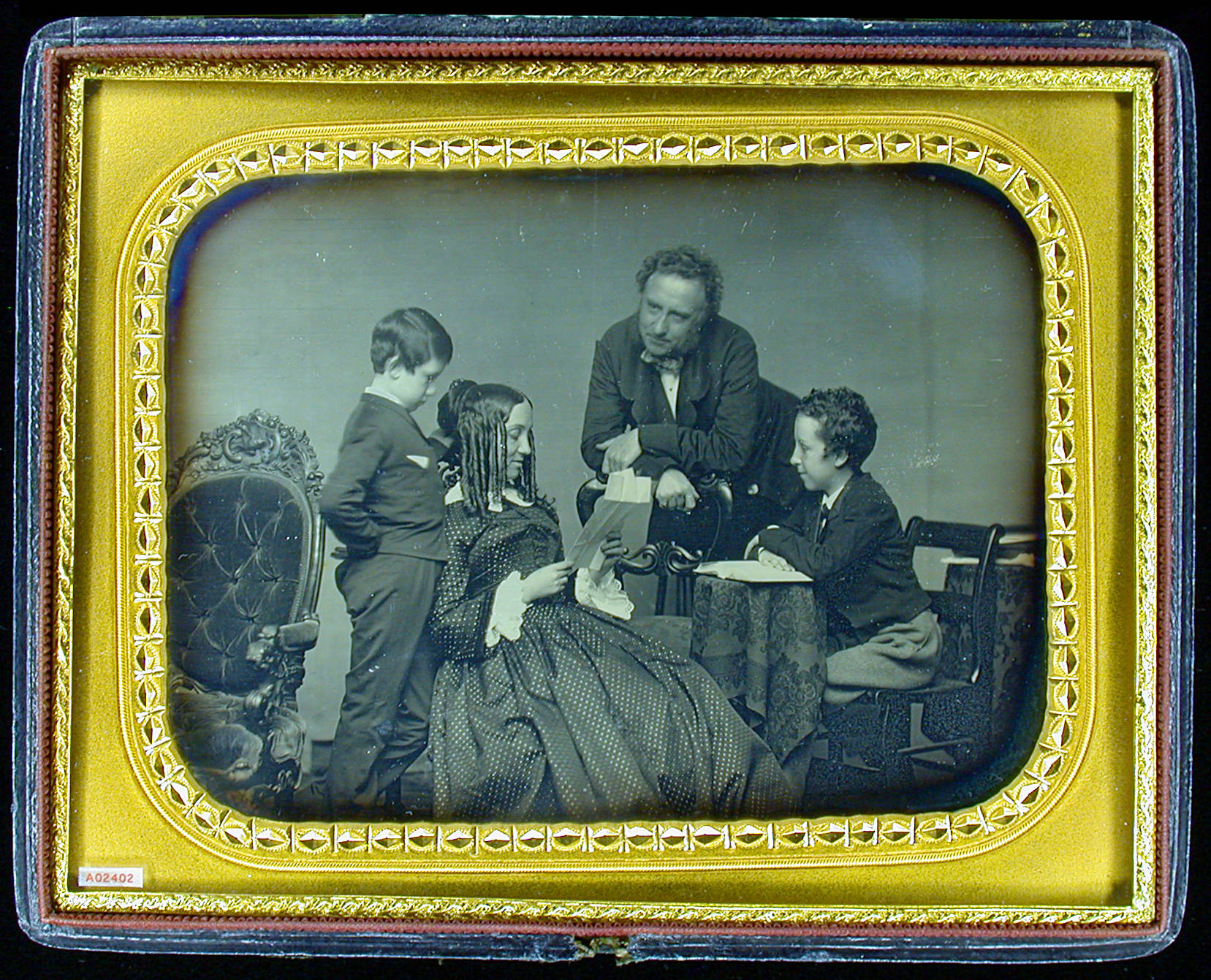
Henry Winthrop Sargent & Family, circa 1852

Sargent studied law in the Boston office of Samuel Hubbard but never practiced. He next became a partner in the banking house of Gracie & Sargent in New York City, agents of his uncle, Samuel Welles, a Paris banker.

In 1841, Sargent retired and moved to "Wodenethe", an estate of about 20 acres (81,000 m^{2}) on a plateau overlooking the Hudson River just above Fishkill Landing (now Beacon), New York, which soon became famous for its distant views and its vistas cut through the native forest to the Hudson and the mountains, and for its extensive plantation of coniferous trees. He was an early friend of the great landscape gardener, Andrew Jackson Downing, from whom he derived his earliest lessons, and he edited one of the editions of Mr. Downing's work.

The poet William Cullen Bryant was a visitor to "Wodenethe", named for the Saxon for "sylvan promontory". While "Wodenethe" was their primary residence, the Sargents also kept a house at 5 Marlborough Street in Boston.

=== Literary works ===
In 1847–49, Sargent travelled with his family in Europe and the Levant, primarily to gather plants and to study the design of parks and country places. As a result, he later published a comprehensive garden guide entitled Skeleton Tours (1870), which included the British Isles, the Scandinavian Peninsula, Russia, Poland, and Spain. He was a frequent contributor to horticultural papers, especially to the Horticulturist, and in 1873 with Charles Downing he wrote a supplement to Andrew Downing's Cottage Residences (1842).

Sargent's most important literary contribution is his supplement to the sixth (1859) and subsequent editions of Downing's A Treatise on the Theory and Practice of Landscape Gardening (1841). In this he gave an account of the newer deciduous and evergreen plants and told in considerable detail of the development of his own "Wodenethe" and of the estate of his relative, Horatio Hollis Hunnewell, in Wellesley, Massachusetts. A second supplement, added in the edition of 1875, gives a brief account of trees and shrubs introduced since 1859. In a period which marks the beginning of the professional practice of landscape architecture in the United States, this book and its supplement exerted a great influence on popular taste. Sargent's influence may also be seen more directly in the horticultural interests of his kinsmen, Hunnewell and Charles Sprague Sargent.

== Personal life ==
On January 10, 1839, Sargent married Caroline Olmsted (1819–1887), daughter of Maria (née Wyckoff) and Francis Olmsted of New York. There were three children of this marriage, two of whom predeceased their father, including:

- Winthrop Henry Sargent (1840–1916), who married Aimée Rotch (1852–1918)
- Francis Sargent (1844–1869)

Sargent died on November 11, 1882, and was buried at St. Luke's Church Cemetery in Beacon, New York.
