= Epes Sargent =

Epes Sargent may refer to:

- Epes Sargent (poet) (1813–1880), American writer and editor
- Epes Sargent (soldier) (1690–1762), American soldier and landowner
- Epes W. Sargent (1872–1938), American vaudeville critic
