= General Pratt =

General Pratt may refer to:

- Don Pratt (1892–1944), U.S. Army brigadier general
- Douglas Henry Pratt (1892–1958), British Army major general
- Henry Conger Pratt (1882–1966), U.S. Army major general
- James T. Pratt (1802–1887), Connecticut Horse Guard major general
- Richard Henry Pratt (1840–1924), U.S. Army brigadier general
- Thomas Simson Pratt (1797–1879), British Army general

== See also ==
- John Pratt (soldier) (1753–1824), U.S. Army captain who served as acting Adjutant General of the U.S. Army
- Attorney General Pratt (disambiguation)
