= Attorney General Pratt =

Attorney General Pratt may refer to:

- Albert F. Pratt (1872–1928), Attorney General of Minnesota
- Charles Pratt, 1st Earl Camden (1714–1794), Attorney General for England and Wales
- Daniel Pratt (New York politician) (1806–1884), Attorney General of New York

== See also ==
- General Pratt (disambiguation)
