= Isaac Addington =

Isaac Addington (January 22, 1645 – March 19, 1715) was an American lawyer who served as the Chief Justice of the Superior Court of Judicature, the highest court in the Province of Massachusetts Bay.

== Biography ==
Addington was born in Boston, the capital of the Massachusetts Bay Colony, to Isaac and Anne Addington. He attended Harvard College for two years (1658–59), but did not graduate. He was apparently trained further in medicine, for he styled himself for many years as a chirurgeon, even while occupying public offices.

== Career ==
Coat of Arms of Isaac Addington

In 1672 he was given a temporary appointment as the Suffolk County register of deeds, which was made permanent the following year. He would fill this role until 1690, except during the period of the Dominion of New England, 1686–89.

In 1685 he was elected to the colonial assembly, and the following year he was chosen to sit on the court of assistants (a body that served as the assembly's upper house and as the colonial high court).

Upon the arrival of Sir Edmund Andros to head the Dominion of New England in December 1686, Addington was on a committee charged with managing the dominion records. The dominion was highly unpopular, and in 1689 Andros was arrested in a popular uprising. In its aftermath Addington was appointed secretary of the committee that provisionally governed the colony until 1692.

In May 1692 Sir William Phips arrived with the colonial charter for the Province of Massachusetts Bay, which included the territory of the old Massachusetts colony and that of Plymouth Colony. Addington was appointed Secretary of the province by Phips, who had been appointed its first governor; Addington held this office until his death.

He was appointed the record keeper of a number of the province's courts, and also served for several years on the bench of the Suffolk County Court of Common Pleas. On June 30, 1702, governor Joseph Dudley appointed him to be Chief Justice of the Superior Court of Judicature, the province's high court. He only held this office for a year, at which time he resigned, citing poor health and the workload of his other positions.

== Family ==
Addington was twice married; his only child apparently died young. Addington died in Boston on March 19, 1715, aged 70, and was buried in the tomb of governor John Leverett in Boston's King's Chapel Burying Ground. He bequeathed his estate to a nephew, Addington Davenport, who later followed his uncle onto the superior court bench.

Legal offices
Preceded by Wait Winthrop	Chief Justice of the Massachusetts Superior Court of Judicature; 1702-1703	Vacant Title next held by Wait Winthrop
