= Horace Binney Sargent =

American soldier & politician (1821-1908)

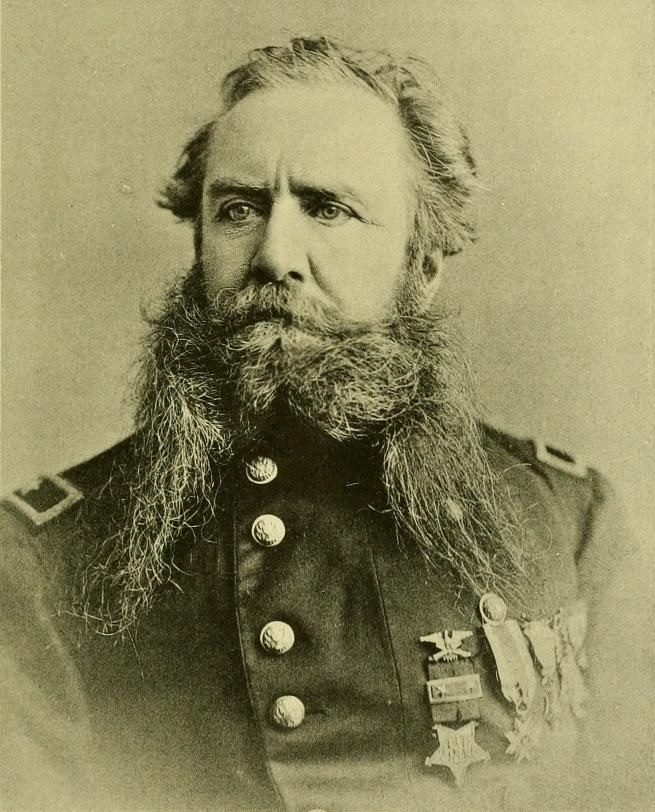

Chair of the Greenback Party of Massachusetts
- In office November, 1880 – 1881
- Preceded by: Position established
- Succeeded by: Vacant

Personal details
- Born: June 26, 1821 Quincy, Massachusetts
- Died: January 8, 1908 (aged 86) Santa Barbara, California
- Spouse: Elizabeth Little Swett
- Parent(s): Lucius Manlius Sargent; Mary Sarah Binney
- Education: Harvard University; Harvard Law School
- Occupation: Soldier, politician

Military service
- Allegiance: United States of America; Union
- Branch/service: Union Army
- Years of service: 1861–1864
- Rank: Colonel; Bvt. Brigadier General
- Commands: 1st Massachusetts Cavalry Regiment
- Battles/wars: American Civil War

Horace Binney Sargent (June 26, 1821 – January 8, 1908) was an American soldier and politician.

== Early life ==
Sargent was born in Boston, Massachusetts, United States. He was the son of Lucius Manlius Sargent (1786–1867), an author and temperance advocate, and Mary Sarah Binney (d. 1824), the sister of Horace Binney, a Member of the U.S. House of Representatives from Pennsylvania's 2nd District.

He graduated from Harvard University with a Bachelor of Arts degree in 1843. He received his ll.b. from Harvard Law School in 1845, was admitted to the bar, and practiced in Boston. In 1846, Sargent received his Master of Arts degree from Harvard.

== Career ==
During the American Civil War he joined the Union Army, becoming an aide to General Nathaniel P. Banks with the rank of lieutenant colonel. Serving in the Army of the Potomac, he fought in the engagements at Secessionville, Culpeper Court House, and Rapidan Station, and in the battles of Antietam, South Mountain, Chancellorsville, and Gettysburg. In the spring of 1864, as Colonel of the 1st Massachusetts Cavalry Regiment, he was seriously wounded and this ended his career. For his services Sargent was brevetted to the rank of brigadier general.

He served as commander of the Massachusetts Department of the Grand Army of the Republic from 1876 to 1878 and was also a companion of the Massachusetts Commandery of the Military Order of the Loyal Legion of the United States. He was the first president of the Soldiers Home in Chelsea, Massachusetts, a position which he filled until 1884, and he remained on its board of trustees until his death.

He ran for Governor of Massachusetts as the Greenback Party candidate in 1880. After retirement he lived in California with his daughter Elizabeth.

== Personal life ==
He was married to Elizabeth Little Swett (1822–1866), the daughter of Tasker Hazard Swett. Together, they were the parents of:

- Horace Binney Sargent Jr. (1847–1896)
- Elizabeth Hazard Sargent (1850–1920), who married Bowman H. McCalla (1844–1910), a rear admiral in the U.S. Navy
- William Winthrop Sargent (1851–1867), who died young.
- Lucius Manilus Sargent (1848–1893), who married Marian Appleton Coolidge (1853–1924), eldest daughter of Ambassador T. Jefferson Coolidge and a descendant of Thomas Jefferson.

Sargent died of heart disease in Santa Barbara, California on January 8, 1908.
