= Lucius Manlius Sargent =

American poet

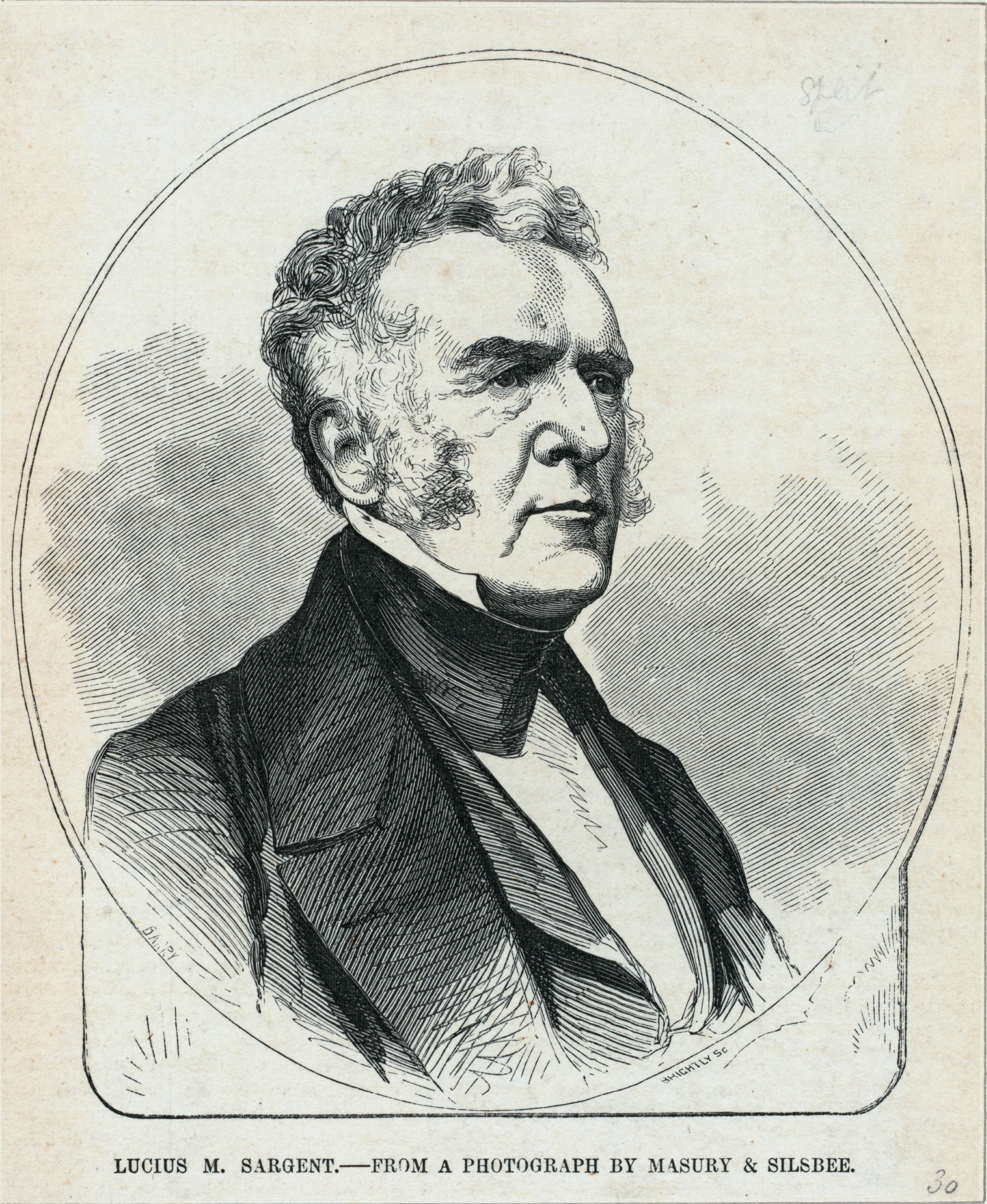
- (1880)
- Born: June 25, 1786; Boston, Massachusetts
- Died: June 2, 1867 (aged 80); Boston, Massachusetts
- Education: Phillips Exeter Academy; Harvard College
- Spouses: Mary Sarah Binney (m. 1816; died 1824) Sarah Cutler Dunn (m. 1825)
- Children: 4, including Horace
- Parent(s): Daniel Sargent Sr. Mary Turner
- Relatives: Daniel Sargent (brother); Henry Sargent (brother); Paul Dudley Sargent (uncle); Judith Sargent Murray (cousin); Epes Sargent (grandfather)

Lucius Manlius Sargent (June 25, 1786 – June 2, 1867) was an American author, antiquarian, and temperance advocate who was a member of the prominent Sargent family of Boston.

== Early life ==
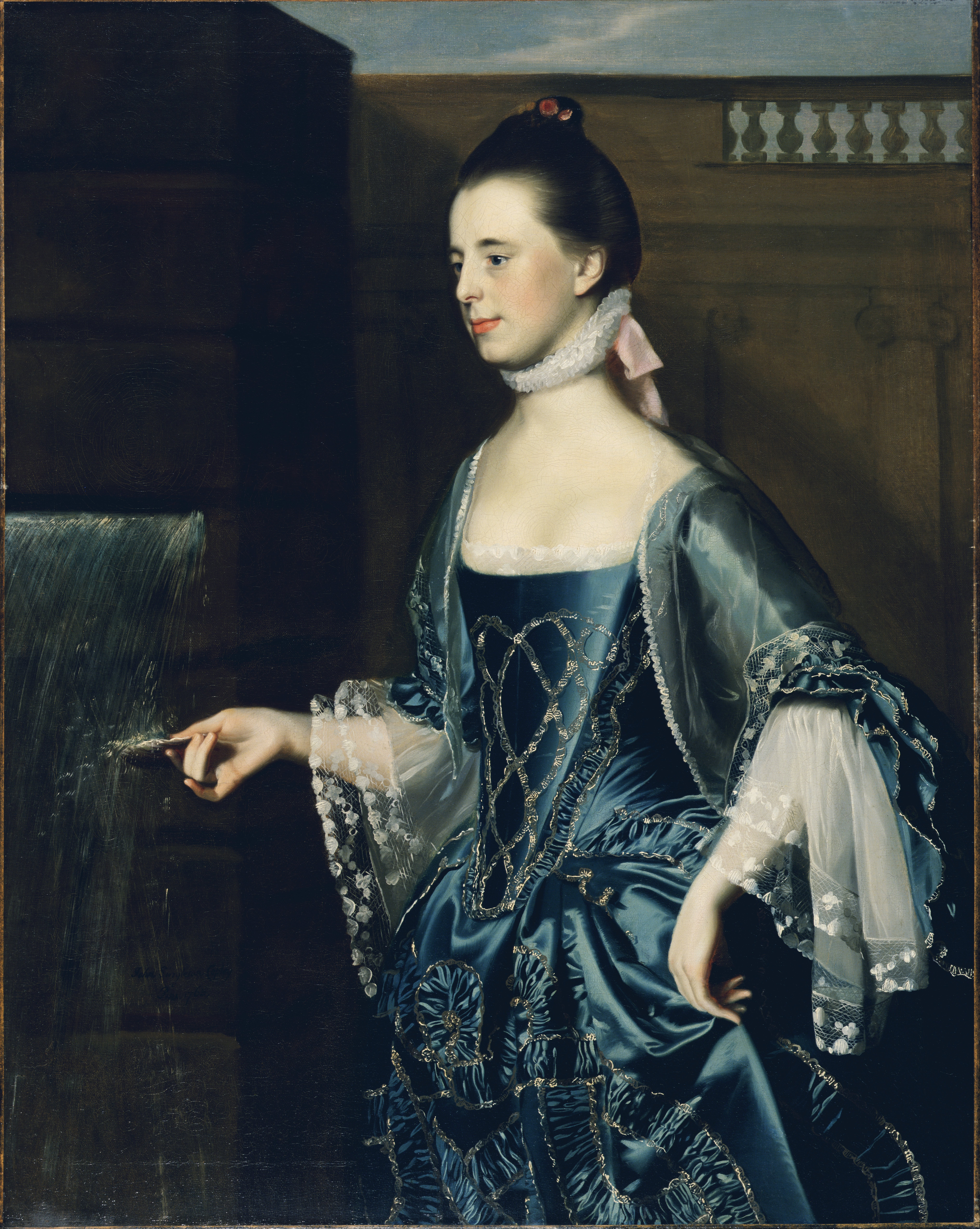
Portrait of Sargent's mother, Mary Turner, by John Singleton Copley, 1763

Sargent was born in Boston, the youngest of seven children of Daniel Sargent Sr. (1730–1806) and Mary Turner (1744–1813), daughter of John Turner of The House of the Seven Gables. His father was a merchant dealing in fishermen's supplies who had moved from Gloucester to Boston and profited so much by his industry, prudence, and popularity that he occupied what was for those days a conspicuously expensive mansion, although his character was notable for thrift and dread of ostentation.

He was the brother of businessman politician Daniel Sargent and artist Henry Sargent (father of Henry Winthrop Sargent), cousin of the early advocate of women's equality Judith Sargent Murray, and the nephew of American Revolutionary War soldier Paul Dudley Sargent. His paternal grandfather was Epes Sargent, a Representative to the General Court of Massachusetts.

=== Education ===
Lucius Manlius attended a number of elementary and secondary schools, including Phillips Exeter Academy, from which he passed to Harvard in 1804. He did not complete his studies there, for a pamphlet published by him in 1807, No. 1 of the New Milk Cheese, pours furious scorn on an official of the college with whom he had had a dispute about the quality of the food at the commons table. He studied law after leaving college and was admitted to the bar on February 19, 1811, but he never practised to any extent, for he inherited wealth and greatly increased it by conservative speculation.

== Career ==
He turned to literature as a vocation, publishing The Culex of Virgil; with a Translation into English Verse and a collection of Latin riddles in 1807 and Hubert and Ellen, a volume of poems, in 1812. At the Boston peace celebration on February 22, 1815 (following the War of 1812), an ode of his, "Wreaths for the Chieftain," was sung. He wrote constantly for the newspapers and became well known for his literary interests.

=== Temperance ===
He found a popular subject in temperance reform, which he took up with characteristic assertiveness. From 1830 till the approach of the Civil War he spoke and wrote on this theme so frequently and vigorously that he became one of the most uncompromising and conspicuous leaders in the crusade against liquor. He wrote Three Temperance Tales (2 vols., 1848), twenty-one stories of a tract-like nature bearing such titles as "My Mother's Gold Ring", "I Am Afraid There Is A God", "Groggy Harbor", and "An Irish Heart", first published in separate issues between 1833 and 1843. These were widely distributed by religious and temperance societies as well as by Sargent himself. His temperance tales were translated into several languages.

=== Antiquarian ===
He also achieved prominence as an antiquarian. In 1848 he began a series of weekly articles in the Boston Evening Transcript entitled "Dealings with the Dead" (published in book form in 1856), which in spite of their name did not lack light touches. Under such pseudonyms as Sigma, Amgis, Saveall, and others, he wrote for numerous other publications, and he aroused considerable interest by attacking the coolie trade of the British in India (Evening Transcript, April 16-October 3, 1856) and by assailing Thomas Babington Macaulay for statements derogatory to William Penn (Dealings with the Dead, I, pp. 231–69).

Though he showed enthusiasm for the past, his efforts were generally directed towards blasting something offensive to him out of existence. At seventy-five he published The Ballad of the Abolition Blunder-buss (1861), which abuses Ralph Waldo Emerson and others for their antislavery views as violently as his Temperance Tales do the saloonkeeper. Even one of his obituaries refers to him as a man of "harsh prejudices", though it acknowledges the urbanity of his manners in his ordinary dealings and the warmth of his attachment to his family and friends.

He also wrote Reminiscences of Samuel Dexter (1858) and The Irrepressible Conflict (1861). His numerous poems were never printed in book-form.

== Personal life ==
On April 3, 1816, he married Mary Binney (1786–1824), a sister of Horace Binney of Philadelphia. Her sister, Susan Binney was married to John Bradford Wallace and were the parents of Horace Binney Wallace. Before her early death, they had three children together, including:

- Mary Turner Sargent (1818–1841)
- Horace Binney Sargent (1821–1908), who married Elizabeth Little Swett (1822–1866)

After the death of his first wife in 1824, Lucius Manlius married Sarah Cutler Dunn (1797–1868) on July 14, 1825. Their son:

- Lucius Manlius Sargent, Jr. (1826–1864)

Sargent died in Boston on June 2, 1867.

=== Descendants ===
His son, Horace, graduated from Harvard in 1843, and from the law school there in 1845. At the opening of the Civil War he was senior aide on the staff of Gov. John A. Andrew, was commissioned lieutenant-colonel of the 1st Regiment, Massachusetts Cavalry, in 1861, became colonel of the same regiment in October 1862, was on duty with the forces in South Carolina, in the Army of the Potomac and the Department of the Gulf, participating in the engagements of Secessionville, Culpeper, and Rapidan Station, and in the battles of Antietam, South Mountain, Chancellorsville, and in the Red River campaign under Gen. Banks, where he was wounded in action, March 21, 1864. He was brevetted brigadier general for "gallantry and good conduct," and on September 29, 1864, was mustered out on account of wounds received in action. He was a frequent contributor to periodical literature and the press, and delivered numerous addresses.

His younger son, Lucius Jr., graduated at Harvard in 1848, and at the medical school there in 1857, becoming house surgeon and dispensary physician at the Massachusetts General Hospital. He was commissioned surgeon in the 2nd Massachusetts Volunteers in May 1861, but resigned in October of that year, and became captain in the 1st Massachusetts Volunteer Cavalry, was ordered to the Army of the Potomac, and participated in the battles of Kelly's Ford, Antietam, South Mountain, Fredericksburg, and Chancellorsville. He became major in his former regiment, January 2, 1864, lieutenant colonel, September 30, and was mortally wounded in an engagement on Meherrin River.

=== Honors ===
In 1842, Harvard conferred the degree of A.M. on him, thereby recognizing his public services and condoning his undergraduate rebellion, for the violence of which he often expressed regret. He was preeminently a good hater, but he was a conspicuous man in his day and helped to develop a sentiment in favor of prohibition, besides making rather valuable contributions to local history.
