= On the Equality of the Sexes =

18th century feminist essay

"On the Equality of the Sexes", also known as "Essay: On the Equality of the Sexes", is a 1790 essay by Judith Sargent Murray. Murray wrote the work in 1770 but did not release it until April 1790, when she published it in two parts in two separate issues of Massachusetts Magazine. The essay predated Mary Wollstonecraft's A Vindication of the Rights of Women which was published in 1792 and 1794, and the work has been credited as being Murray's most important work.

In this feminist essay, Murray posed the argument of spiritual and intellectual equality between men and women. It also included a liberal analysis of traditional male superiority in the Bible and criticism of the deprivation of female education of the time.

== Synopsis ==
In the first part of the essay, which is prefaced by a poem she wrote, Murray argues against the idea that women are not mentally equal to men in all areas. She notes that the “province of imagination hath long since been surrendered to us”, but that women are extremely limited in how they exercise their imaginations. She scornfully points out that women have channeled this creativity into fashion, slander, and gossip to incredibly skilled ends, but stresses that she is not pointing this out in order to "furnish these facts as instances of excellency in our sex" but to be used as "proofs of a creative faculty, of a lively imagination". Murray then states that traditional female activities like sewing and cooking will not bring out women's creativity and intellects to their fullest potential, as she views these as activities that do not require much thought or attention, and that women cannot fulfill that potential if other avenues of expression and learning are denied to them.

She further supports her argument by comparing and contrasting two two-year-old siblings, one male and one female. Murray states that normally a two-year-old girl will be wiser than a boy of the same age, but she will receive dramatically different schooling from that age on and that "one is taught to aspire, and the other is early confined and limitted". As she believes that nature has given men and women the ability to be intellectual equals, Murray argues that any inferiority is a result of the culture and not nature. Because females are not given the same education and are confined to stereotypical gender roles and actions, that many women will end up exercising her imagination in destructive ways that will not fill the void that would otherwise have been appeased by higher education. As a result, the woman will grow embittered towards her brother, as she sees him as both her oppressor and as representative of what she was denied.

However, if the woman was given the ability to accompany her brother in his studies, the woman could have excelled in subjects like astronomy and geography that could have made her better able to appreciate Jehovah. This would have the benefit of not only discouraging her from idle, destructive pastimes but to also encourage her to come up with ideas that could greatly benefit mankind and to foster stronger friendships and marriages. This does not mean that women cannot or would not take care of activities such as cooking or sewing, but that this will give them the liberty to reflect upon their education and come up with positive ideas as opposed to negative ones. Murray then poses that some would state that women only need to take care of domestic duties, only for her to argue that this idea is degrading, as women would thus be forbidden from contemplating anything more complicated than "the mechanism of a pudding, or the sewing the seams of a garment". She objects against the idea so strongly that she further states that if this is the case, that women should be denied entrance Heaven as well in order to be consistent with them being denied entrance to proper education.

Murray completes part one of the essay by stating that the souls of women are equal to that of man and that there have been women throughout history that have shown that they can be man's equals. She further notes that some naysayers have argued for the mental superiority of man because they are also physically stronger, but that this concept is faulty for several reasons. Not only are many animals that are stronger than men, but that there are also effeminate men and robust women. She further comments that even if "animal strength proved any thing", that it is possible for women to have been given the ability to have superior minds to make up for this imbalance. However, Murray stresses that she is only mentioning this possibility because she wants to be equal, not because she wants one sex to be superior over the other.

In part two Murray acknowledges that there are passages in the Bible that could be used to back up the argument of male superiority, but that she considers these passages to be metaphors and not fact. She also points out several examples of biblical men that were imperfect, such as Job cursing against God, which she feels invalidates the idea of using the Bible to support male superiority. Murray restates that women should be allowed equal access to education, as this would prevent women from seeing men as adversaries and would discourage issues that would arise from this line of thought.

She also revisits the idea of education interfering with a woman's household duties, suggesting that education can be held in the early hours of the morning and that as women are encouraged to "fill up time rationally", that they can find a way to balance both education and housework. She further notes that women tend to have more leisure time than their male counterparts and that this is what typically leads to women falling prey to idle pastimes. Murray closes with a letter she wrote to an associate, where she argues the same points in the essay.
