= Winthrop Sargent (writer) =

American writer

Winthrop Sargent (23 September 1825 – 18 May 1870) was an author. He was the grandson of Winthrop Sargent.

== Early life ==
Winthrop Sargent was born on 23 September 1825 in Philadelphia. He graduated from the University of Pennsylvania in 1845, and from Harvard Law School in 1847, and settled in Philadelphia, and afterward in New York City, where he practiced law.

== Writing ==
He wrote for the periodical press, especially on genealogical and historical subjects. His publications include History of an Expedition against Fort Duquesne in 1775, under Major-General Braddock, edited from Original Manuscripts, which was commended by George Grote, the historian, and was described by Washington Irving as "ably edited, with an admirable introductory memoir" (Philadelphia, 1855); The Loyalist Poetry of the Revolution (1857); The Journal of the General Meeting of the Cincinnati (1858); Loyal Verses of Joseph Stansbury and Dr. Jonathan Odell, with Introduction and Notes (Albany, 1860); Life and Career of Maj. John André (Boston, 1861); and Les États Confédérés et de l'esclavage (The Confederacy and Slavery; Paris, 1864). For many years he was engaged in preparing a “catalogue raisonné” (an annotated bibliography) of books relating to America, which he left unfinished.

== Death ==
Sargent died in Paris on 18 May 1870.

== Selected publications ==
- History of an Expedition against Fort Duquesne in 1775, under Major-General Braddock, edited from Original Manuscripts (Philadelphia, 1855)
- The Loyalist Poetry of the Revolution (1857)
- The Journal of the General Meeting of the Cincinnati (1858)
- Loyal Verses of Joseph Stansbury and Dr. Jonathan Odell, with Introduction and Notes (Albany, 1860)
- Life and Career of Maj. John André (Boston, 1861)
- Les États Confédérés et de l'esclavage (The Confederacy and Slavery) (Paris, 1864)
