= John Sergeant =

John Sergeant may refer to:

- John Sergeant (journalist) (born 1944), English journalist and broadcaster
- John Sergeant (missionary) (1710–1749), American missionary to the Mahicans of Stockbridge
- John Sergeant (politician) (1779–1852), American politician
- John Sergeant (priest) (1623–1707/10), Roman Catholic priest and writer

== See also ==
- John Sargent (disambiguation)
