= Daniel Sargent Sr. =

American merchant

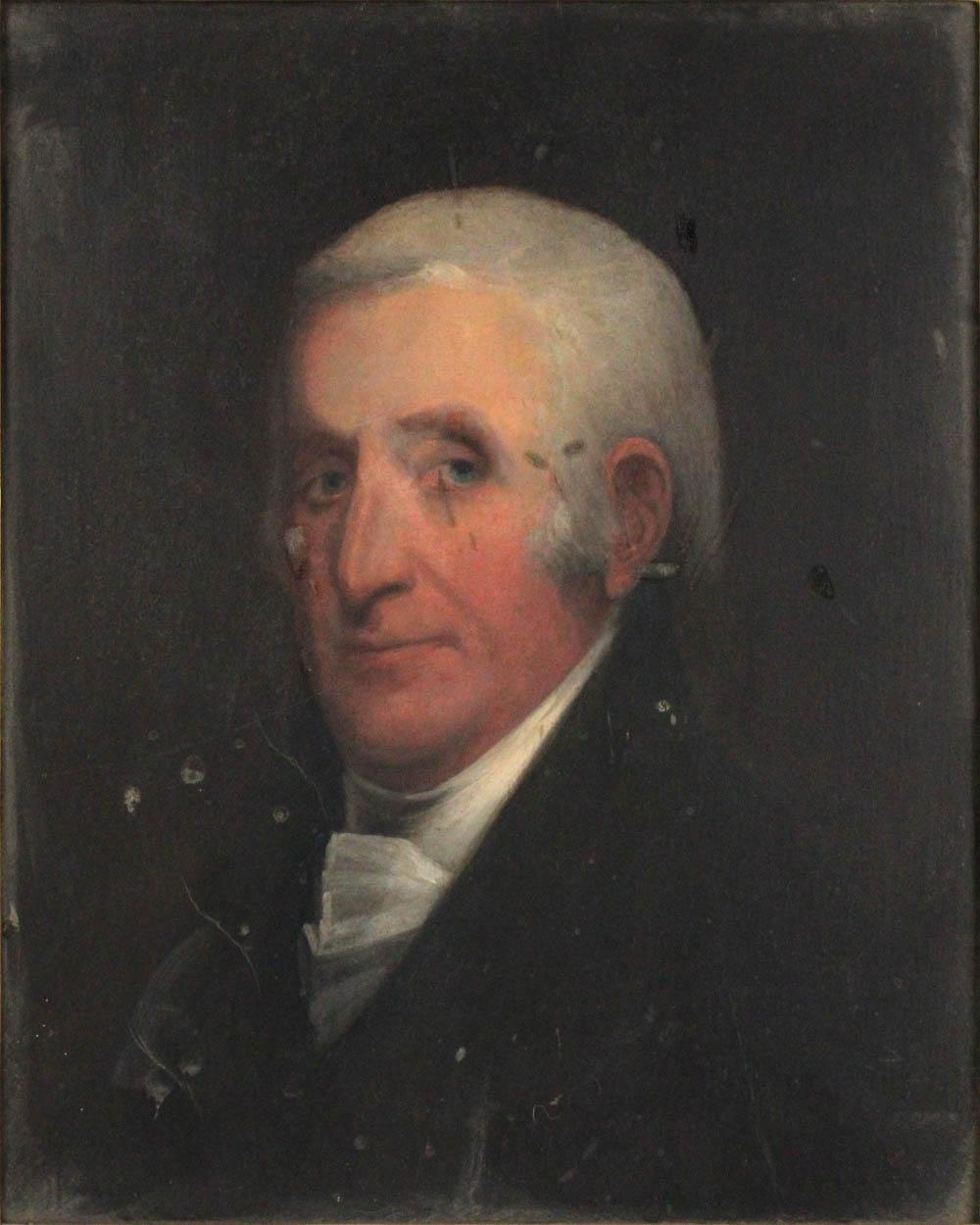
- portrait by Henry Sargent
- Born: March 18, 1730; Gloucester, Massachusetts
- Died: February 18, 1806 (aged 75); Boston, Massachusetts
- Occupation: Merchant
- Spouse: Mary Turner (m. 1763)
- Children: 7, including Daniel, Henry, Lucius
- Parent(s): Epes Sargent; Ester McCarty
- Relatives: Paul Dudley Sargent (brother); John Sargent (brother)

Daniel Sargent Sr. (March 18, 1730 – February 18, 1806) was an American merchant in Gloucester, Massachusetts, and then Boston.

== Early life ==
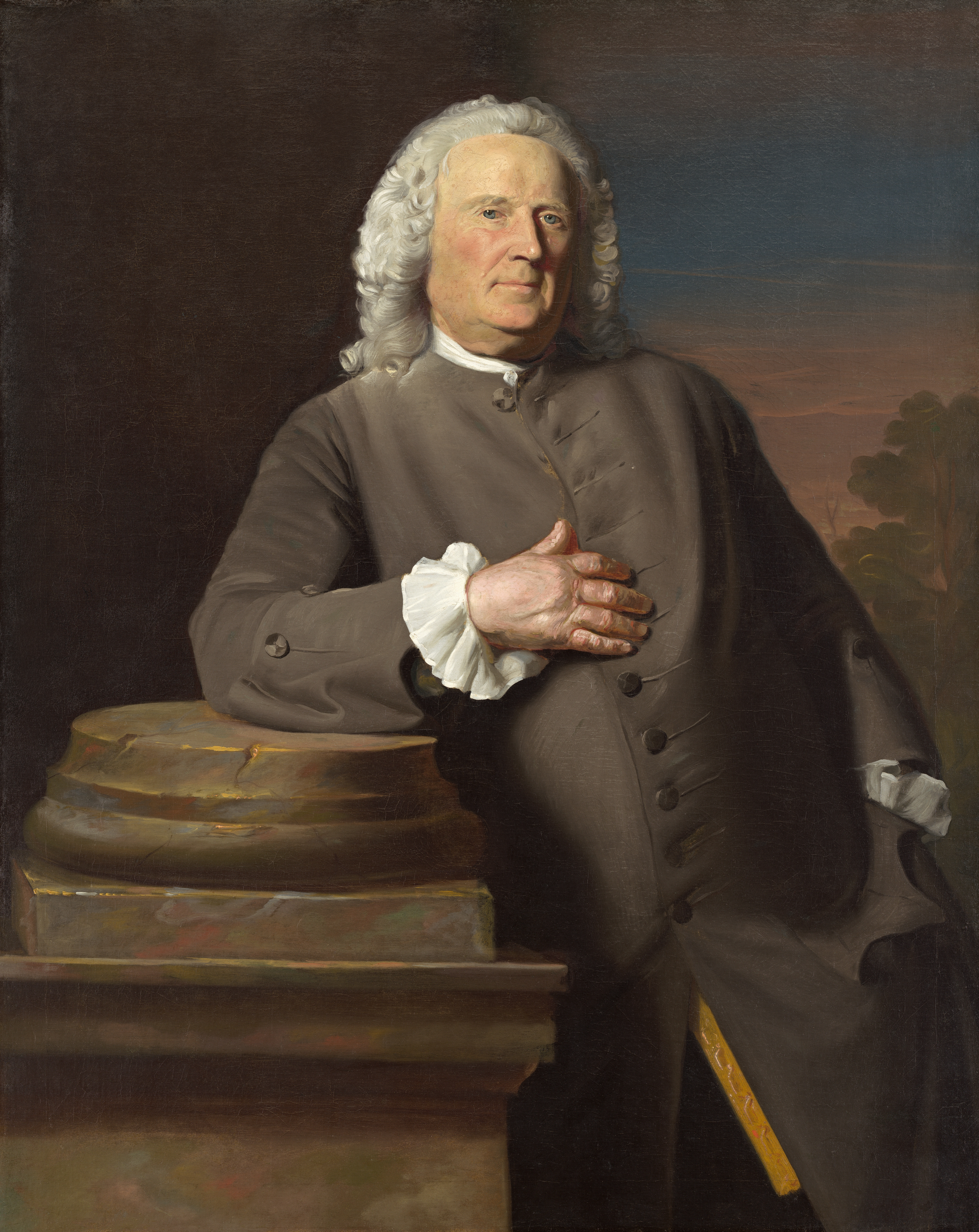
Portrait of Sargent's father, Epes Sargent, by John Singleton Copley, 1760

Sargent was born on March 18, 1730, in Gloucester, Massachusetts. He was the son of Col. Epes Sargent (1690–1762) and Ester McCarty, daughter of Florence McCarty. His brothers were Revolutionary war hero Paul Dudley Sargent (1745–1828) and John Sargent (1750–1824).

Through his other brother Winthrop Sargent (1727–1793), he was the uncle of Judith Sargent Murray (1751–1820), the poet and advocate for women's rights, and Winthrop Sargent (1753–1820), Governor of Mississippi Territory. His father was one of the largest landholders in Gloucester and had is portrait painted in 1760 by John Singleton Copley two years before his death in 1762.

== Career ==
He was a very successful merchant who was referred to as the "merchant prince". He was engaged in the fishing business and foreign trade, moving to Newburyport, Massachusetts, and then to Boston, where he had his offices at 25 and then 40 Long Wharf and owned Sargent's Wharf, Boston, MA.

== Personal life ==
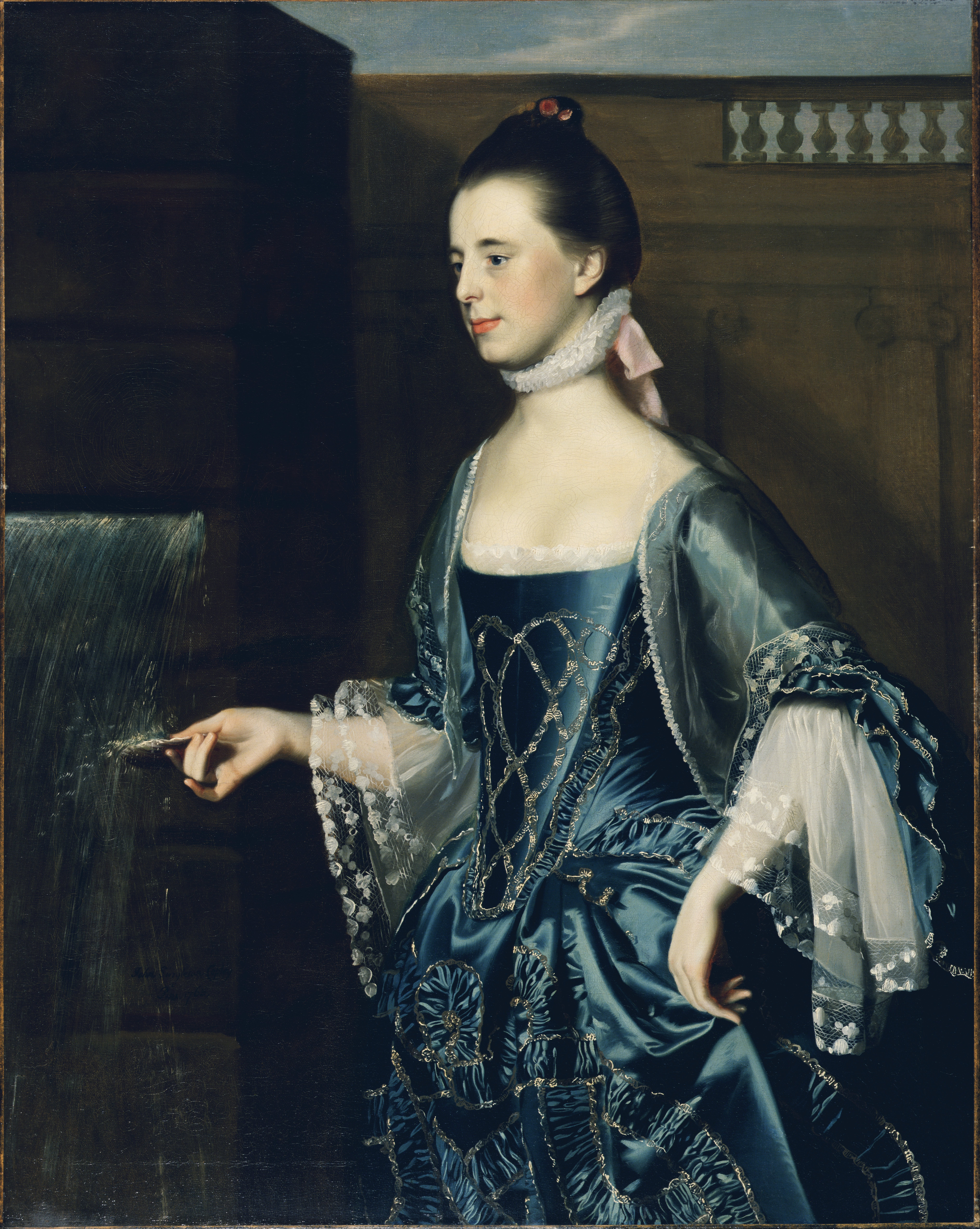
Portrait of Sargent's wife, Mary Turner, by John Singleton Copley, 1763

In 1763, he married Mary Turner (1744–1813), the daughter of John Turner III of the House of the Seven Gables. Daniel's wife Mary was extremely close to his niece Judith Sargent Murray and many of their correspondence were kept by Judith and now at the Sargent House Museum. John Singleton Copley portrait of Mary Turner Sargent is at Fine Arts Museums of San Francisco. Together, they had one daughter, who died young, and six sons:

- Daniel Sargent (1764–1842), a politician who was close friends with John Quincy Adams.
- Ignatius Sargent (1765–1821)
- John Turner Sargent (1769–1813)
- Henry Sargent (1770–1845), a painter
- Mary Osborne Sargent, (1780–1781), who died in infancy.
- Winthrop Sargent (1783–1808)
- Lucius Manlius Sargent (1786–1867), the temperance advocate.

Sargent died on February 18, 1806, at his home in Boston, at the corner of Essex and Lincoln Streets.

=== Descendants ===
Through his second son Ignatius, he was the great-grandfather of Harvard botanist Charles Sprague Sargent (1841–1927). He was also the four-times-great grandfather of John Turner Sargent, CEO of Macmillan Publishers.
