= William Browne Sargent =

Canadian politician (1787-1853)

- Born: 12 August 1787; Barrington, Nova Scotia
- Died: 13 January 1853 (aged 65)
- Spouse: Elizabeth Burbridge (m. 1819)
- Parent(s): John Sargent; Margaret Whitney
- Relatives: John Sargent (brother); Winthrop Sargent (brother)

William Browne Sargent (August 12, 1787 – January 13, 1853) was a fish merchant and political figure in Nova Scotia. He represented Barrington township in the Nova Scotia House of Assembly from 1818 to 1826.

He was born in Barrington, Nova Scotia, the son of John Sargent, an American born Loyalist who served in the provincial assembly, and Margaret Whitney. In 1819, Sargent married Elizabeth Burbridge. He was a justice of the peace and a lieutenant-colonel in the militia. Sargent served as an assistant judge in the Inferior Court of Common Pleas.

His brothers John and Winthrop also served in the provincial assembly.
