= John Pratt (soldier) =

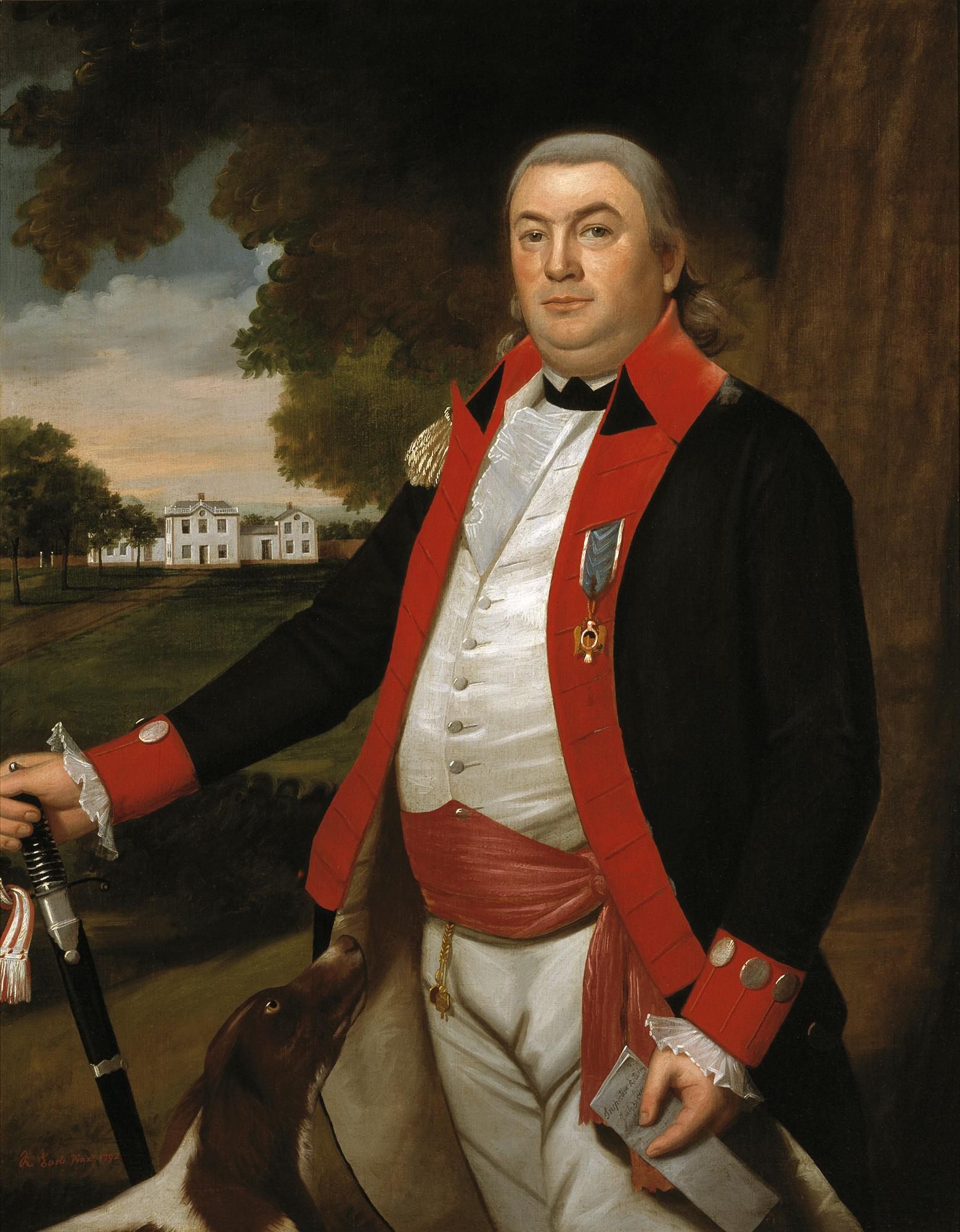
- 1792 portrait of Pratt by Ralph Earl
- Born: October 12, 1753; Pennsylvania
- Died: December 27, 1824 (aged 71)
- Military career
- Allegiance: United States of America
- Branch: United States Army
- Service years: 1779–1783,1785–1793
- Rank: Captain
- Commands: Adjutant General of the U.S. Army
- Conflicts: American Revolutionary War; Battles of Saratoga; Northwest Indian War; Harmar Campaign

Signature
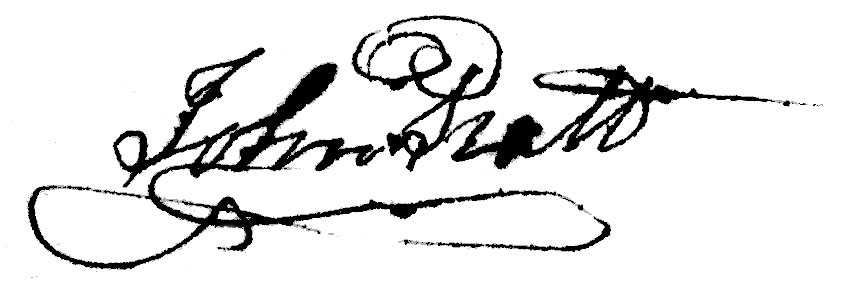

John Pratt (October 12, 1753 – December 27, 1824) was an officer in the United States Army who served as acting Adjutant General of the U.S. Army from 1790 to 1791.

== See also ==
- List of Adjutants General of the United States Army

Military offices
Preceded by Ebenezer Denny (acting)	Adjutant General of the U. S. Army; November 7, 1790 – September 4, 1791 (acting)	Succeeded by Winthrop Sargent (acting)
