= Winthrop Sargent (politician) =

Canadian politician (1794-1866)

- Born: 6 June 1794
- Died: 3 October 1866 (aged 72)
- Spouse: Mary Jane Allison (m. 1819)
- Parent(s): John Sargent; Margaret Whitney
- Relatives: William Browne Sargent (brother); John Sargent (brother)

Winthrop Sargent (June 6, 1794 – October 3, 1866) was a merchant and political figure in Nova Scotia. He represented Shelburne County in the Nova Scotia House of Assembly from 1836 to 1840.

He was born in Barrington, Nova Scotia, the son of John Sargent, who also served in the provincial assembly, and Margaret Whitney. In 1819, he married Mary Jane Allison. In 1849, he was named a justice of the peace for Shelburne. Sargent served as customs collector from 1859 to 1866. He was named custos rotulorum in 1857 but refused the position. He served as a consul for the United States. He died in Barrington at the age of 72.

His brothers John and William Browne also served in the provincial assembly.
