= Winthrop Sargent =

American politician and military officer (1753–1820)

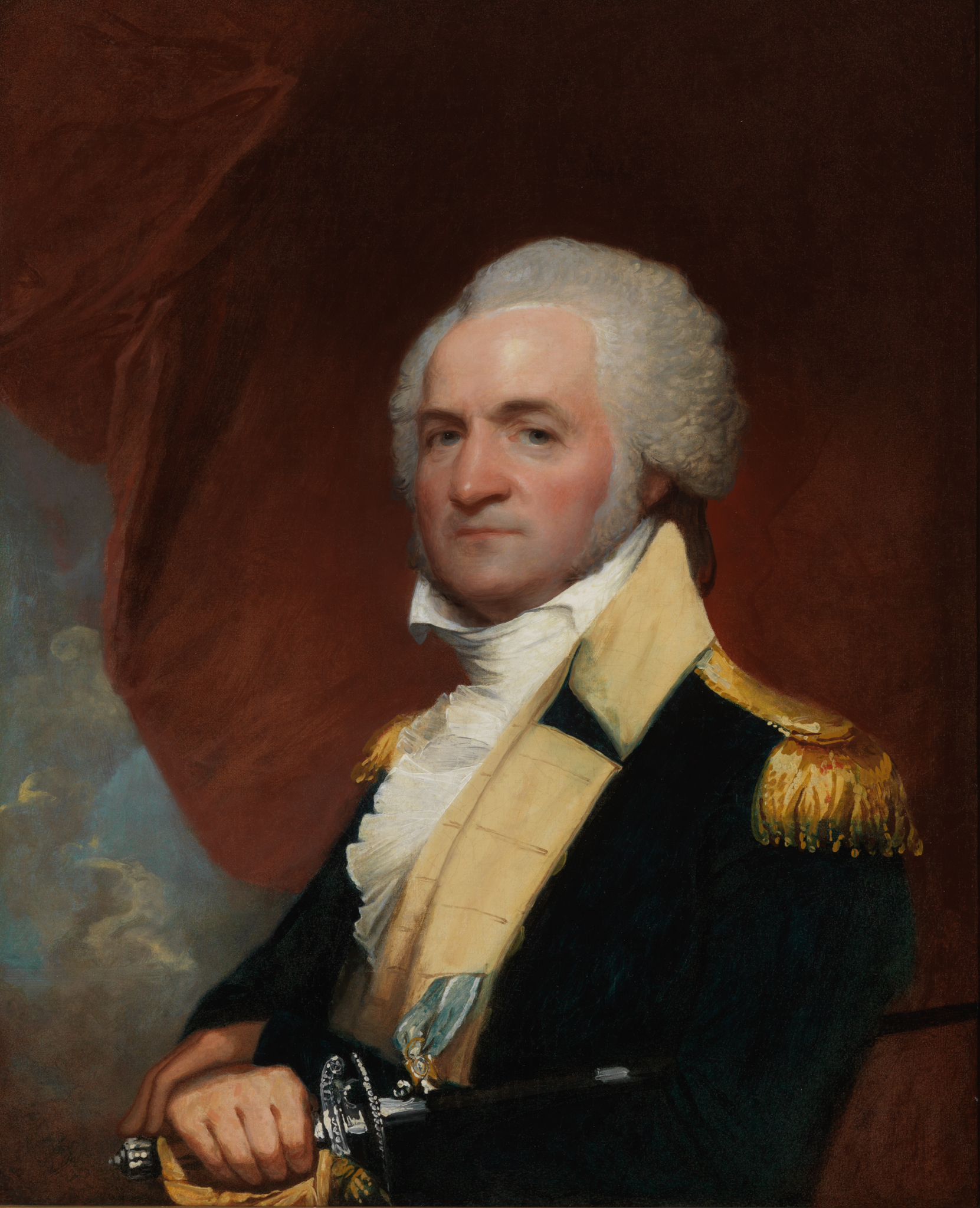
- Portrait by Gilbert Stuart, c. 1799–1805

Governor of Mississippi Territory
- In office May 7, 1798 – May 25, 1801
- Preceded by: Position established
- Succeeded by: William C. C. Claiborne

Secretary of Northwest Territory
- In office July 9, 1788 – May 31, 1798
- Preceded by: Position established
- Succeeded by: William Henry Harrison

Adjutant General of the U. S. Army (Acting)
- In office September 4, 1791 – November 4, 1791
- Preceded by: John Pratt (Acting)
- Succeeded by: Ebenezer Denny (Acting)

Personal details
- Born: May 1, 1753 Gloucester, Province of Massachusetts Bay
- Died: June 3, 1820 (aged 67) New Orleans, Louisiana
- Party: Federalist
- Spouse(s): Roewena Tupper (m. 1789; died 1790) Mary McIntosh Williams
- Relations: Judith Sargent Murray (sister); Benjamin Tupper (father-in-law); Paul Dudley Sargent (uncle)
- Parent(s): Winthrop Sargent; Judith Saunders
- Education: Harvard College

Winthrop Sargent (May 1, 1753 – June 3, 1820) was an American politician, military officer and writer, who served as Governor of Mississippi Territory from 1798 to 1801, and briefly as acting Adjutant General of the U. S. Army in 1791. He was a member of the Federalist party.

== Early life ==
Sargent was born in Gloucester, Massachusetts, on May 1, 1753. He was one of eight children born to Winthrop Sargent (1727–1793) and Judith Saunders. His elder sister was Judith Sargent Murray (1751–1820), an essayist, playwright, and poet.

He was the grandson of Colonel Epes Sargent, one of the largest landholders in Gloucester. Sargent was also the nephew of Daniel Sargent Sr. (1730–1806), a prominent merchant, Paul Dudley Sargent (1745–1828), who also served in the Continental Army, and John Sargent (1750–1824), a Loyalist during the Revolution.

He graduated from Harvard College Class of 1771 before the Revolution. He spent some time at sea, as captain of a merchantman owned by his father.

== Career ==
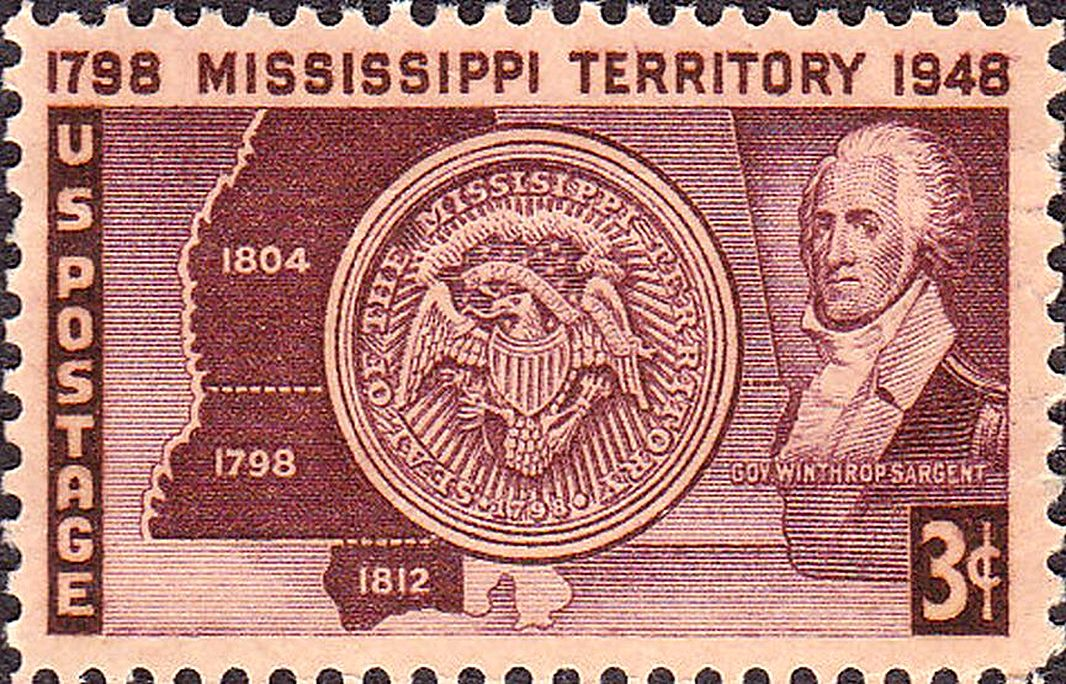
~ Mississippi Territory ~ ~ Winthrop Sargent ~ Issue of 1948

Shortly after the outbreak of the American Revolution, Sargent was commissioned in Gridley's Regiment of Massachusetts Artillery on July 7, 1775, as a lieutenant, and later that year was promoted to captain lieutenant of Knox's Regiment, Continental Artillery, on December 10. He was with his guns at the siege of Boston, and later served in the battles of Long Island, White Plains, Trenton, Brandywine, Germantown, and Monmouth. He was promoted to captain in the 3rd Continental Artillery on January 1, 1777, and brevetted major on August 25, 1783, and was discharged from the Continental Army later that year. In 1783 he became an Original Member of the Massachusetts Society of the Cincinnati.

In 1786, he helped to survey the Seven Ranges, the first lands laid out under the Land Ordinance of 1785. With inside knowledge of the area, he went on to form the Ohio Company of Associates, was an important shareholder in the Scioto Company, and as of 1787, secretary of the Ohio Company.

Sargent was appointed by the Congress of the Confederation as the first Secretary of the Northwest Territory, a post second in importance only to the governor, Arthur St. Clair. He took up his post in 1788. Like St. Clair, Sargent would function in both civil and military capacities; he served as acting Adjutant General of U.S. Army from September 1791 until he was wounded twice at the Battle of the Wabash, on November 4, 1791. On August 15, 1796, he would, as Acting Governor, proclaim the establishment of Wayne County, the first American government in what is now Michigan.

President John Adams then appointed Sargent the first Governor of the Mississippi Territory, effective from May 7, 1798, to May 25, 1801. His last entry as Northwest Territory's secretary was on May 31, 1798; he arrived at Natchez on August 6, but due to illness was unable to assume his post until August 16.

The subject was a cotton planter, marketing his crop in New York by Gilbert and John Aspinwall, merchants.

=== Later life ===
In 1788, Sargent was elected a Fellow of the American Academy of Arts and Sciences. He was also a member of the American Philosophical Society elected in 1789 and an original member of the Society of the Cincinnati as a delegate from Massachusetts, and published, with Benjamin B. Smith, Papers Relative to Certain American Antiquities (Philadelphia, 1796), and "Boston," a poem (Boston, 1803).

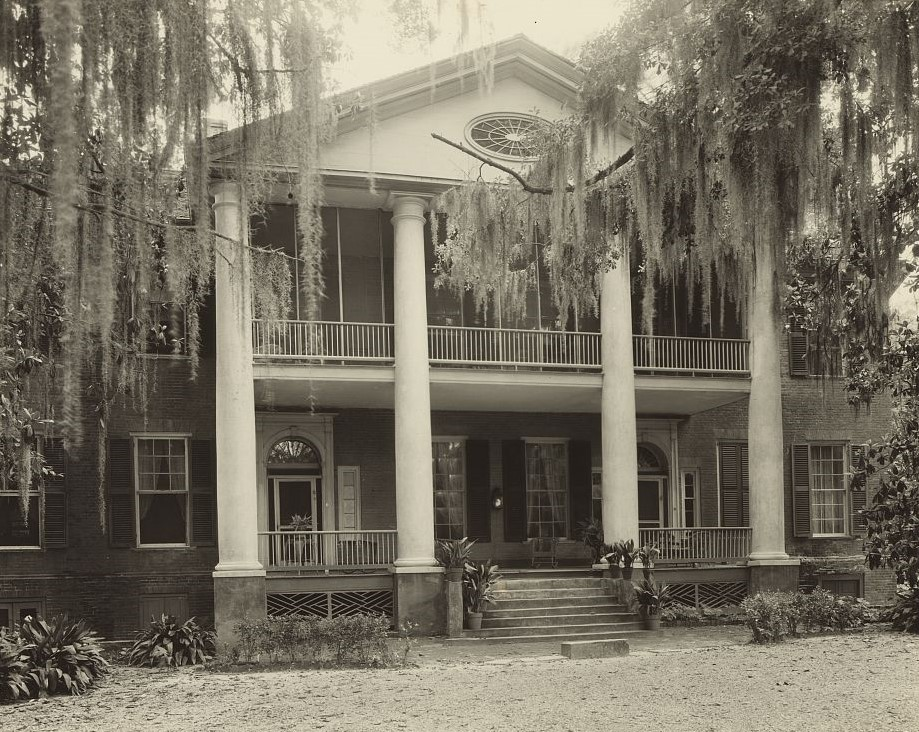
Gloucester, Natchez, by Frances Benjamin Johnston, 1938. Originally known as Bellevue. Built by David Williams family, ca. 1800. Winthrop Sargent bought it from the Williams in 1808.

Being a Federalist, Sargent was dismissed from his position as territorial governor of Mississippi in 1801 by incoming president Thomas Jefferson. Sargent took up life in the private sector, developing his plantation Gloucester, the earliest such establishment in Natchez. Sargent was elected a member of the American Antiquarian Society in 1813.

During the last decades of Winthrop's life he became major plantation owner in [Natchez, Mississippi]. He acquired extensive plantations due to his marriage to wealthy widow Mary (McIntosh) Williams. In Natchez alone Winthrop owned over 300 slaves and 11,000 acres.

== Personal life ==
In 1789, he married Roewena Tupper (1766–1790), a daughter of Gen. Benjamin Tupper, at the settlement of Marietta in the first marriage ceremony held under the laws of the Northwest Territory. After her death, he married Hannah Ober of Massachusetts on 13 Feb 1791. They had a daughter, Hannah born 25 August 1791 in Massachusetts, and Hannah Ober died the next day. Then he married Mary McIntosh Williams (1760–1823) shortly after moving to Natchez. They were the parents of:

- Caroline Augusta Sargent (1795–1844), who married Fielding Lewis Turner (1776–1843)
- William Fitz-Winthrop Sargent (b. 1799)
- George Washington Sargent (1802–1864), who married Margaret Isabella Jessie Percy (1802–1865).

Winthrop established a series of laws in 1799 in Mississippi that were informally known as Sargents Code. The territorial laws of Mississippi enacted a county code, criminal court system, probate code and regulations for the militia.

He died on June 3, 1820, in New Orleans. His grandson was the writer Winthrop Sargent (1825–1870). A 1848 Louisiana Supreme Court case decided that the Louisiana portion of Winthrop's estate which included real estate, timber, agricultural properties in Louisiana, Mississippi, Ohio, Virginia and Massachusetts would be divided between his son George Washington Sargent as well as his stepchildren through his marriage to Mary Williams. These step children included Mary (Williams) Urquhart and Mary Sargents grandchildren through her deceased son James C Williams, namely David Percy Williams. Some of the properties of Winthrop Sargent were passed through the Natchez David Williams family who arrived in the 1700s according to Supreme Court case. The Winthrop Sargent estate was worth several million dollars in 1700s currency and valued at nearly 10 million dollars in the mid-1800s when his heirs divided his estate. Archie Percy Williams was a mix race planter and third generation heir of Sargent. A.P Williams became a millionaire in 1800s dollars via inheritance from his father David Percy Williams. In the 1850s D.P. Williams allotted A.P. Williams share to the 1/4th division of Sargents estate The majority of the Winthrop Sargent estate today is owned by one of the Williams heirs, Anton R Williams. Anton Williams Holding Company of 136 E. Michigan Ave. Kalamazoo, Michigan and its funding arm continues legacy business operations.

Sargent's son George Washington Sargent graduated from Harvard College, class of 1820, and was killed in 1864.

== Legacy ==
Although there are at least two Sargent Townships (in Illinois and Nebraska) and one Sargent County, it is not known if these are named after Winthrop Sargent. However, a former township of the Northwest Territory's Wayne County was designated as Sargent Township or the District of Sargent; this apparently encompassed the settlements downriver from Detroit and at the River Raisin in what is now Monroe County, Michigan. This township apparently ceased to function after the organization of Michigan Territory, being replaced by the District of Erie. A student dormitory at Ohio University (founded in 1804) in Athens, Ohio, is named Sargent Hall in his honor. This is the first university in the Northwest Territory and the first in Ohio.

Political offices
New title	Secretary of Northwest Territory; July 9, 1788 – May 31, 1798	Succeeded by William Henry Harrison
New title	Governor of Mississippi Territory; May 7, 1798 – May 25, 1801	Succeeded by William C. C. Claiborne
Military offices
Preceded by John Pratt (acting)	Adjutant General of the U. S. Army; September 4, 1791 – November 4, 1791 (acting)	Succeeded by Ebenezer Denny (acting)
