= John Sargent (merchant) =

Nova Scotian politician (1792–1874)

- Born: 6 April 1792
- Died: 7 August 1874 (aged 82)
- Spouse: Sarah Wright Doane (m. 1818)
- Parent(s): John Sargent; Margaret Whitney
- Relatives: William Browne Sargent (brother); Winthrop Sargent (brother)

John Sargent (April 6, 1792 – August 7, 1874) was a farmer, merchant and political figure in Nova Scotia. He represented Barrington township in the Legislative Assembly of Nova Scotia from 1736 to 1740 as a Conservative.

He was born in Barrington, Nova Scotia, the son of John Sargent and Margaret Whitney. In 1818, he married Sarah Wright Doane. Sargent was a justice of the peace and a captain in the militia. He died in Barrington at the age of 82.

His brothers William Browne and Winthrop also served in the assembly.
