= Daniel Sargent (politician) =

American merchant and politician

Treasurer and Receiver-General of Massachusetts
- In office 1817–1822
- Governor: John Brooks
- Preceded by: John T. Apthorp
- Succeeded by: Nahum Mitchell

Member of the Massachusetts General Court
- In office 1813–1813
- In office 1805–1810

Member of the Massachusetts State Senate
- In office 1812–1812

Personal details
- Born: January 15, 1764 Gloucester, Massachusetts
- Died: April 2, 1842 (aged 78) Boston, Massachusetts
- Party: Federalist
- Spouse: Mary Frasier (m. 1802; died 1804)
- Relations: Henry Sargent (brother); Lucius M. Sargent (brother); Daniel S. Curtis (grandson)
- Children: 2
- Parent(s): Daniel Sargent Sr. Mary Turner
- Education: Harvard University

Daniel Sargent Jr. (January 15, 1764 – April 2, 1842) was a successful American merchant and politician in Boston, Massachusetts.

== Early life ==
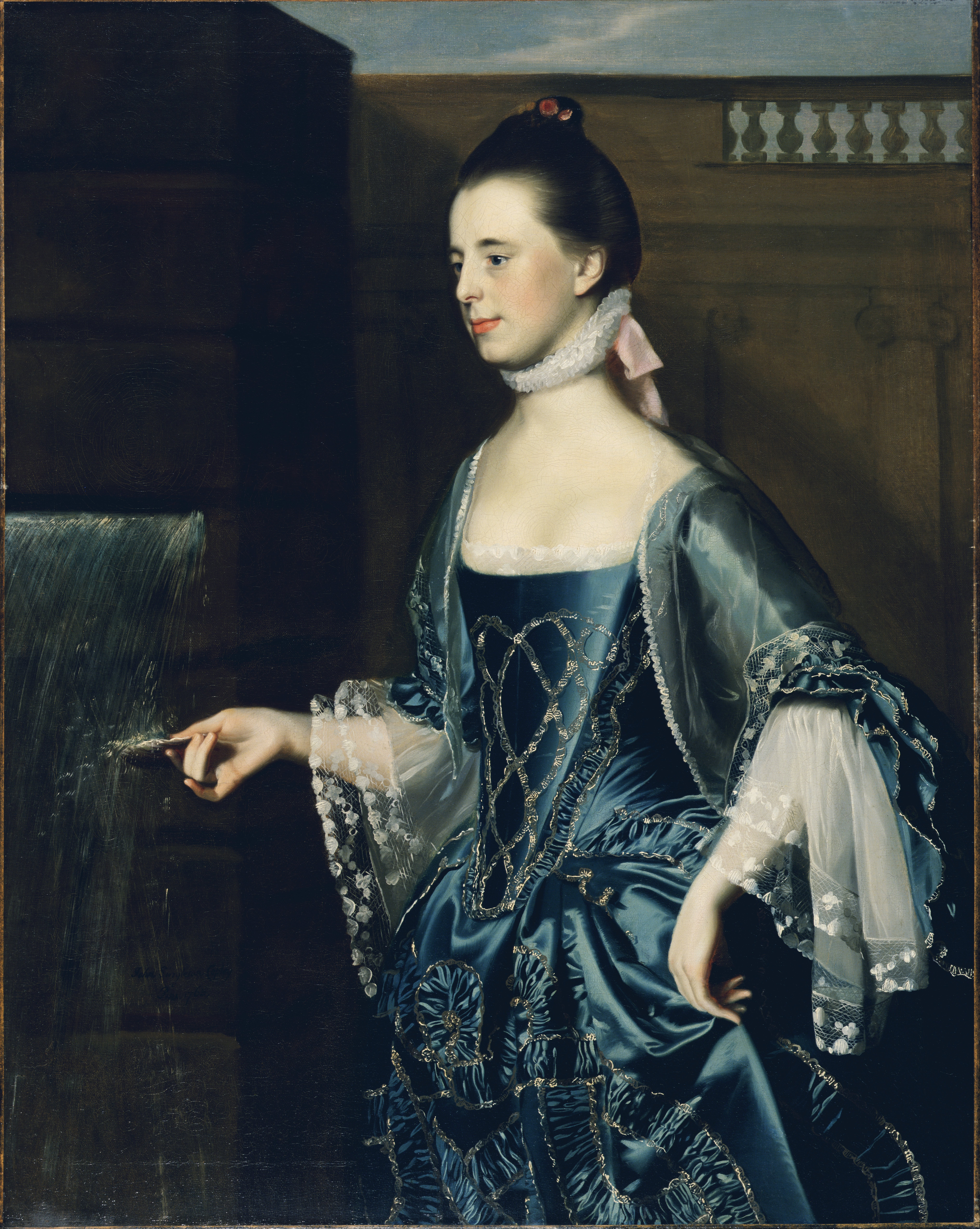
Portrait of Sargent's mother, Mary Turner, by John Singleton Copley, 1763

Sargent was born on January 15, 1764, in Gloucester, Massachusetts. He was the son of Daniel Sargent Sr. (1730–1806) and Mary (née Turner) Sargent (1743–1813). His father was a successful merchant, who was referred to as the "merchant prince". He was the brother of artist Henry Sargent (1770–1845) and Lucius Manlius Sargent (1786–1867).

His maternal grandfather was John Turner of the House of the Seven Gables. Daniel was a first cousin of the early advocate of women's equality Judith Sargent Murray and her brother, Gov. Winthrop Sargent, as well as the nephew of American Revolutionary War soldier Paul Dudley Sargent.

Daniel was a close friend of John Quincy Adams, since childhood.

== Career ==
He was a successful merchant in Gloucester and later in Boston; he was a director of the Boston Bank from its incorporation in 1802. He was the director and later President of the Boston Marine Insurance Company, A member of the first Board of Trustees of the Massachusetts General Hospital, 1813–21,

He was the Treasurer and Receiver-General of Massachusetts 1817–22. He represented Boston in the Legislature from 1805 to 1810 and in 1813, and was a State Senator in 1812 and 1814.

Like most of the successful merchants of his time, Daniel Sargent was a Federalist and a strong and active opponent of Jefferson's Embargo. In 1798, he was chosen the first Captain of the then newly organized Boston Light Infantry, an office which he filled for five years.

== Personal life ==
In 1794, he had a child out of wedlock with Hepzibah (née Atkins) Brown (d. 1800), which "...was a Boston Society scandal of the last decade of the 18th century" as both of them were from prominent Boston families. Hepzibah was the daughter of Henry Atkins, also a distinguished Boston merchant, and the widow of James Brown, whom she married in 1788, but who died shortly thereafter. In 1796, Hepzibah married James Durfee, with whom she had another daughter, Mary. Daniel and Hepzibah's daughter was:

- Nancy Brown (1794–1876), later known as Anne Sargent Gage, who married Dr. Leander Gage (1792–1842), and had eight children.

For the first two years of her life, "Nancy" was raised by her mother. In 1796, her father placed her in the care of the family of a Mr. John Hall of Dorchester, Mass. There she remained until 1808, when it was decided that she disappear from Boston society. She was sent to live with Rev. Lincoln Ripley (1761–1858) and Phebe Emerson Ripley (b. 1772), sister of Rev. William Emerson (1769–1811) and aunt of Ralph Waldo Emerson (1803–1882), in Waterford, Maine. Also at that time her name was changed to Anne Brewer. She had no further contact with her father, though he provided for her financially. Around the time of her marriage she wrote her father telling him she wanted to be married with the name Anne Sargent. He never responded, either agreeing or disagreeing with the request, and Anne went ahead and did so.

In 1802, Daniel married Mary Frasier and had one child before her death in 1804:

- Maria Osborne Sargent (b. 1803), who married Thomas Buckminster Curtis (1795–1872).

Sargent died on April 2, 1842.

=== Descendants ===
Through his daughter Maria, he was the grandfather of Mary Fraiser Curtis and Daniel Sargent Curtis (1825–1908). Daniel was a successful merchant in Boston retiring to Venice and buying the Palazzi Barbaro Palazzo Barbaro became the hub of American life in Venice with visits from John Singer Sargent, Henry James, Whistler, Robert Browning and Claude Monet. Other members of the “Barbaro Circle” included Bernard Berenson, William Merritt Chase, Isabella Stewart Gardner, and Edith Wharton. Another supporter of the “Barbaro Circle” was Charles Eliot Norton.

Political offices
Preceded by John T. Apthorp	Treasurer and Receiver-General of Massachusetts; 1817–1822	Succeeded by Nahum Mitchell
