= Wait Winthrop =

New England colonial magistrate (1642–1717)

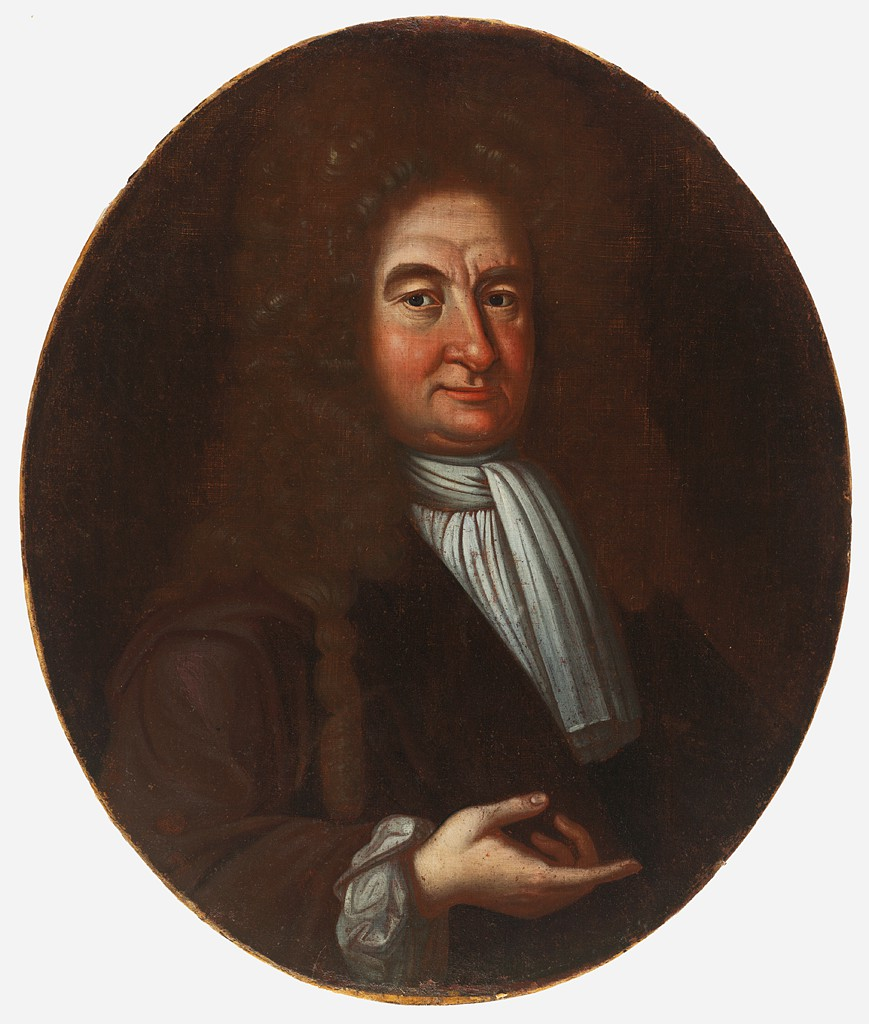
- Born: 27 February 1642
- Died: 7 November 1717 (aged 75)
- Children: 5
- Parent(s): John Winthrop the Younger; Elizabeth Reade

Waitstill Winthrop (27 February 1642 – 7 November 1717) was a colonial magistrate, military officer, and politician of New England.

== Early life ==
Winthrop was born on 27 February 1642 in Boston, the capital of the Massachusetts Bay Colony. He was named Waitstill at birth, but preferred the shortened name "Wait" during his lifetime. He was the second son born to Elizabeth (née Reade) Winthrop (1615–1672) and John Winthrop the Younger, an early governor of the Connecticut Colony. His elder brother was Fitz-John Winthrop, who served as major-general in the army. He was appointed as governor of Connecticut, serving from 1696 until his death in 1707.

Winthrop was the grandson of John Winthrop, a founding governor of the Massachusetts Bay Colony.

== Career ==
Winthrop served as the chief judge of the Massachusetts Superior Court (the highest court in the Province of Massachusetts Bay), and was a long-time councilor and contender for the governorship of Massachusetts.

During King Philip's War in the 1670s and King William's War in the 1690s, he led the Massachusetts provincial militia. Politically populist, he worked against royal governors, especially Joseph Dudley, and sought the restoration of the first Massachusetts charter.

In 1692, he was appointed by Governor Sir William Phips as one of the magistrates of the Court of Oyer and Terminer that heard the Salem witch trials. That same year he was elected to membership in the Military Company of Massachusetts and was also elected as captain of the Company in June.

When the provincial courts were organized under the new charter of the Province of Massachusetts Bay, Winthrop was one of the initial appointees as an associate justice of the Superior Court of Judicature, as the province's highest court was known.

He held this position until the death of chief justice and acting governor William Stoughton, at which time the Governor's Council appointed him to be chief justice. Political forces allied to him were preparing to travel to London to lobby on his behalf for the position of governor when it was learned that Joseph Dudley had received the appointment. Winthrop then tendered his resignation as chief justice. In 1708, Dudley reappointed him to be chief justice, a position he held until his death in 1717.

Winthrop was also active in other pursuits. When not working at his public duties, he devoted himself to agriculture and the study of medicine, often providing assistance in these arts to his neighbors.

== Personal life ==
Winthrop was twice married. His first marriage was to Mary Browne (1656–1690), the daughter of William Browne. Before her death at the age of thirty-four in 1690, they were the parents of:

- John Winthrop (1681–1747), who married Ann Dudley, daughter of Joseph Dudley and granddaughter of Thomas Dudley, both governors of Massachusetts. John graduated from Harvard in 1700, served for some time as a magistrate of Connecticut, and was afterward a fellow of the Royal Society of London, to whose Transactions he was a contributor, and one of whose volumes was dedicated to him.
- Elizabeth Winthrop (1683–1683), who died in infancy.
- William Winthrop (1684–1693), who died young.
- Ann Winthrop (1686–1746), who married Thomas Lechmere.
- Joseph Winthrop (1689–1693), who died in childhood.

On 13 November 1707, Winthrop married for the second time to Katherine (née Brattle) Eyre (1664–1725), the widow of John Eyre and daughter of Captain Thomas Brattle. Her brother was Thomas Brattle, a merchant who served as treasurer of Harvard College and is known for his involvement in the Salem Witch Trials.

Winthrop died on 7 November 1717.

Through his only surviving son, he was the grandfather of John Still Winthrop, himself the father of Thomas Lindall Winthrop (1760–1841), the 13th Lieutenant Governor of Massachusetts.

Legal offices
New seat	Associate Justice of the Massachusetts Superior Court of Judicature; 1692–1701	Succeeded by John Saffin
Preceded by William Stoughton	Chief Justice of the Massachusetts Superior Court of Judicature; 1701	Succeeded by Isaac Addington
Vacant Title last held by Isaac Addington	Chief Justice of the Massachusetts Superior Court of Judicature; 1708–1717	Succeeded by Samuel Sewall
