= Judith Sargent Murray =

American writer and poet (1751–1820)

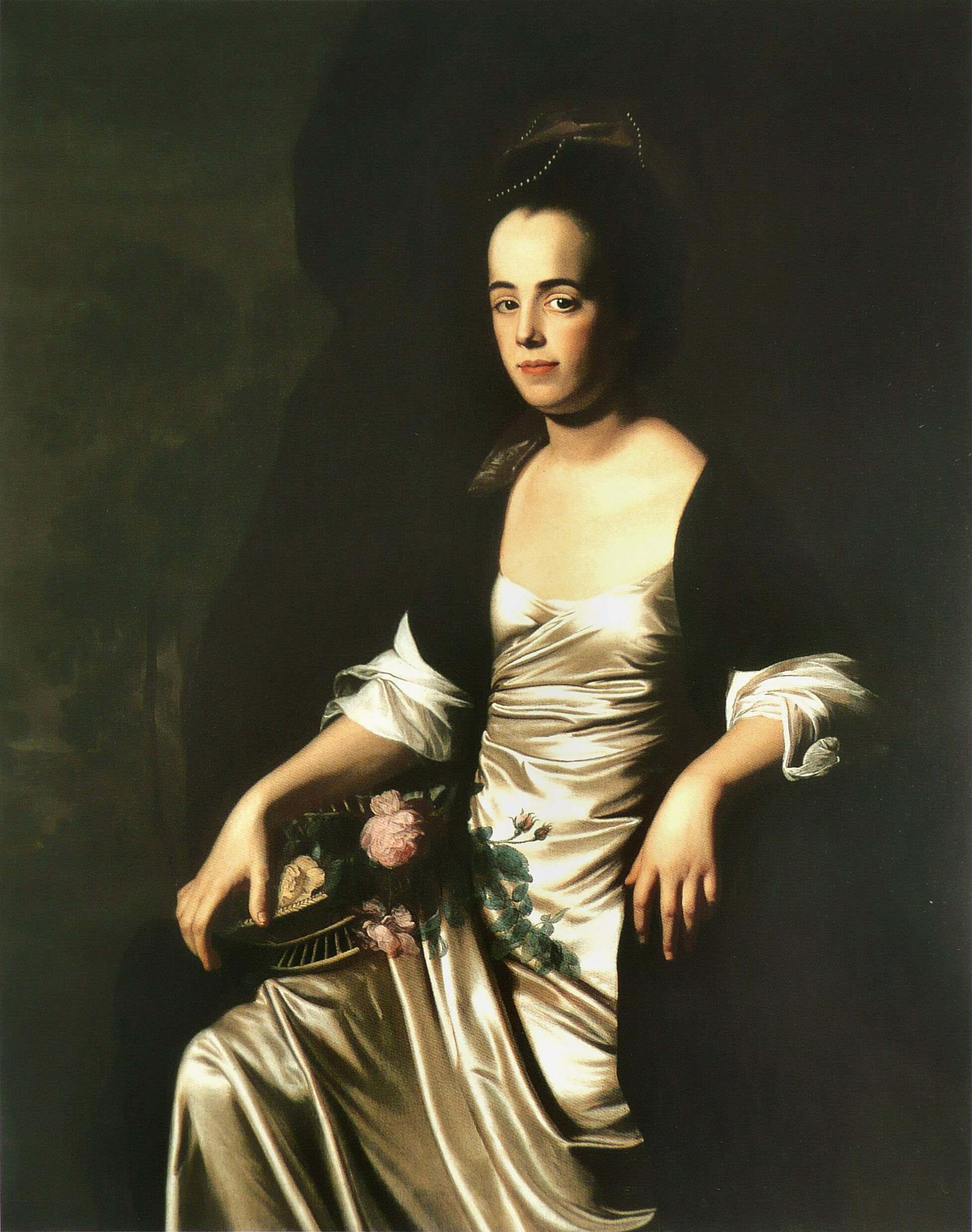
- Portrait of Judith Sargent Murray by John Singleton Copley, Terra Foundation for American Art, Daniel J. Terra Collection
- Born: May 1, 1751; Gloucester, Province of Massachusetts Bay
- Died: June 9, 1820 (aged 69); Natchez, Mississippi
- Other name: Judith Sargent Stevens Murray
- Occupations: Women's rights advocate, essayist, playwright, poet, and letter writer
- Spouse(s): John Stevens (m. 1769; died 1786) John Murray (m. 1788)

Judith Sargent Stevens Murray (May 1, 1751 – June 9, 1820) was an early American advocate for women's rights, an essay writer, playwright, poet, and letter writer. She was one of the first American proponents of the idea of the equality of the sexes so that women, like men, had the capability of intellectual accomplishment and should be able to achieve economic independence.

Among many other influential pieces, her landmark essay "On the Equality of the Sexes" paved the way for new thoughts and ideas proposed by other feminist writers of the century.

== Life and career ==
=== Early life and family ===
Judith Sargent was born on May 1, 1751, in Gloucester, Massachusetts, to Winthrop Sargent and Judith Saunders, an established merchant family, as the first of eight children. The Sargent children were raised in the established Congregational First Parish Church. In the 1770s, Judith, her siblings, and her parents all converted to Universalism and helped to fund and create the first Universalist Church in the nation, installing John Murray as the first pastor.

The Sargent family was considered to be cultured, politically aware, and civically active. As a wealthy, ship-owning merchant family, Judith's parents were able to provide her and her siblings with an education that was considered top-notch at the time. For a woman in that era, her education was unusually thorough. Judith swayed from traditional gender norms by sharing a tutor with her brother, Winthrop Sargent, as he prepared for entry into Harvard College.

However, despite the tutoring, there were few opportunities for her to receive any formal education beyond reading and writing. Much of her knowledge was selftaught through the library in the merchant-class family home. She read history, philosophy, geography, and literature. Her deep interest in education and her family's support led her to write poetry from as young as nine years old. According to family legend, her father read Judith's "humble attempts at poetry" to family members, to make it clear he was incredibly proud of her talents. Although she considered herself as capable as her brother, her educational experience was far inferior to his. Thus, even as a young girl, she was painfully aware of the way her society circumscribed the aspirations of women.

=== Career accomplishments ===
Judith Sargent Murray began her early career covering a wide range of literary styles. Not only did Murray write over one hundred essays, including her landmark essay On the Equality of the Sexes in 1790, she also published a number of books, several poems, and two comic plays throughout the late 1700s and early 1800s.

Sargent published the first time in 1784 arguing that the political independence of the United States could provide the motivation for female self-reliance and economic independence. She complained that young women in the United States lacked the personal resources that would allow them to resist the marriage market. Eight years later, the widowed Murray remarried the Universalist minister John Murray and Sargent Murray published a series of essays from 1791 till 1794 in the Massachusetts Magazine, which she published in 1798 collected entitled The Gleaner. In these essays Sargent Murray was critical of fathers who did not provide for their own sons so that they could learn useful skills as they grew up. Sargent Murray advanced intense criticism against parents who "pointed their daughters" towards marriage and economic dependence.

The book was purchased by such prominent figures as George Washington, John Adams, Henry Knox, and Mercy Otis Warren. Sargent Murray was a staunch believer in improved educational opportunity for women. Her essays were important to the post-Revolution "Republican Motherhood" movement, a movement led by Abigail Adams and other female revolutionaries which aimed to produce intelligent and virtuous citizens required for the success of the new nation.

=== Universalism ===
Judith Sargent Murray was among the group of people in Gloucester, led by her father, Winthrop Sargent, who first embraced Universalism. Universalist historians consider Judith Sargent Murray's involvement in Universalism among the reasons why women have always held leadership roles in the Universalist Church of America, including as ministers. Her 1782 Universalist catechism, written for children, is considered the earliest writing by an American Universalist woman. Her name was included in the public documents that expelled the Gloucester Universalists from First Parish (Calvinist/Congregational) for refusing to attend and pay taxes to the established church. The Universalists took their case to the Massachusetts Supreme Judicial Court and won the first ruling in America for freedom of religion, meaning, the right to support their own church, their own minister, and not pay taxes to First Parish. This ruling affected religious groups throughout the nation.

The minister they wanted to support in their own Universalist church was John Murray, who is considered the founder of organized American Universalism. A native of England, John Murray first arrived in the colonies in 1770 and settled in Gloucester in 1774. Like Judith's father, people up and down the Eastern seaboard had already embraced the Universalist interpretation of the Bible put forth by the Welsh-born James Relly. John Murray, one of Relly's protégés, was the first preacher of the new faith in America. He was charismatic and convincing, and he succeeded in dismantling the dark, gloomy promises of Calvinism in favor of a more hopeful view of the present and life after. He organized fledgling groups into established Universalist churches and societies.

=== Marriages and family ===
On October 3, 1769, at eighteen years old, Judith married John Stevens, an important ship captain and trader at the time. They lived in the Sargent-Murray-Gilman-Hough House and had no children. When England and the Thirteen American Colonies went to war, Judith supported separation from England, despite her friends and family members' economic and familial ties to Great Britain. She described the civil war as being fueled by "hostile terror" and attacking those whose "sentiments correspond not with the popular measures." She believed in a peaceful resolution by separation because she despised the violence and lawless power that reigned over the colonies. During the Revolution, or perhaps sometime afterward, the Sargent and Stevens families converted from Congregationalism to Universalism.

While Judith Sargent Stevens conformed to the norm of wife and mother, she reconceptualized the possibilities of women's contributions to American culture in the early poems that she began composing in 1775. In 1782, she began writing for publication. Only a few of her poems were published in the Boston periodical, Gentlemen and Ladies Town and Country magazine, during 1784. Meanwhile, the American Revolution was raging, the Gloucester's shipping business suffered from the insecure seas. When the revolution finally ended in 1783, Stevens was deep in debt so Judith put her writing to work and began to publish to make an income. Her first essay was published in 1784 for Gentleman and Lady's Town and Country Magazine. "Desultory Thoughts upon the Utility of Encouraging a Degree of Self-Complacency, Especially in Female Bosoms." was her first piece in which she manifested her feminist ideals. In it she laid the groundwork for future essays on women and girls: "I would, from the early dawn of reason address [my daughter] as a rational being" and "by all means guard [my daughters] against a low estimation of self." Like most women of her time – and even men who wanted to hide their identity – she used a pseudonym, "Constantia."

Despite her publication efforts, the war had devastated John Stevens's merchant business. In 1786, he fled the United States to escape debtors' prison and went to the West Indies, where he died soon after. Two years later, in October 1788, she married Reverend John Murray. Judith still kept her maiden name Sargent and signed her letters "Judith Sargent Murray." In 1793, Judith and John moved from Gloucester to Boston, when they founded the city's first Universalist church. At the end of John Murray's life, Judith helped him publish his book Letters and Sketches of Sermons. She also edited, completed, and published his autobiography after his death.

John Murray and Judith had two children together, one of whom survived infancy. Judith Sargent Murray died in Natchez, Mississippi, on June 9, 1820, at the age of 69. She is buried in the Bingaman family cemetery, which was donated to the state-owned "Grand Village" archaeological park by Bingaman descendant Mrs. Grace MacNeil in 1978. Her daughter inscribed on her gravestone, "Dear spirit, the monumental stone can never speak thy worth."

== Letters ==
At approximately age twenty-three, Judith Sargent Murray began making copies of her correspondence to create a historical record for future generations. These letter books, twenty volumes in all, were discovered in 1984 by Gordon Gibson and were published on microfilm by the Mississippi Department of Archives and History, where the original volumes reside. Containing approximately 2,500 letters, Murray's surviving letters make up one of the few collections of writings by women from this period in American history.

== "On the Equality of the Sexes" ==
"On the Equality of the Sexes" is an essay published by Judith Sargent Murray in 1790. Murray wrote the work in 1779 but did not release it until April 1790, when she published it in two parts in two separate issues of Massachusetts Magazine. The essay predated Mary Wollstonecraft's A Vindication of the Rights of Woman which was published in 1792 and 1794, and the work has been credited as being Murray's most important work.

== Legacy ==
Judith Sargent Murray's legacy is a subject of much contemporary discussion. Because her letter books were only fairly recently discovered, no one has been able to produce a complete biography of her life, though "A Brief Biography with Documents" was published by Sheila L. Skemp in 1998.

Alice Rossi's 1974 landmark book The Feminist Papers starts with Murray's "On the Equality of the Sexes." Rossi began the reinstatement of Murray's voice to the American story.

David McCullough included one of Murray's letters in his 2001 biography of John Adams. Cokie Roberts used Murray's letters in her book Founding Mothers.

== Selected works ==
=== Books ===
- Some Deductions from the System Promulgated in the Page of Divine Revelation: Ranged in the Order and Form of a Catechism Intended as an Assistant to the Christian Parent or Teacher published anonymously (1782)
- The Gleaner: A Miscellaneous Production (1798)
- Life of the Rev. John Murray (1816—Judith Sargent Murray was the editor and author of the "continuation")

=== Essays ===
- A Universalist Catechism (1782)
- Desultory Thoughts upon the Utility of Encouraging a Degree of Self-Complacency, Especially in Female Bosoms (1784)
- On the Equality of the Sexes (1790)
- On the Domestic Education of Children (1790)
- The Gleaner (1792–94)
- The Repository (1792–94)
- The Reaper (1794)

=== Poems ===
- A Rebus (1803)
- An Hypothesis (1808)
- Apology for an Epilogue (1790)
- Birth-day Invitation (1803)
- Honora Martesia (1809)
- Lines Occasioned by the Death of an Infant (1790)
- Lines Written while Rocking a Cradle (1802)
- On Blending Spirit with Matter (1803)
- Lines, Inscribed To An Amiable, And Affectionate Mother (1803)
- Expiring Amity (1803)
- Lines (1803)
- The Consolation (1790)
- Elegiack Lines (1790)
- Invocation To Hope (1789)

=== Plays ===
- The Medium, or, Happy Tea-Party; later renamed The Medium, or, Virtue Triumphant (1795)
- The Traveller Returned (1796)
- The African (1805)
