= Wormeley =

Wormeley is a given name and surname. Notable people with the name include:

- Robert Wormeley Carter (1734–1797), Virginia planter and patriot
- Ralph Wormeley Curtis (1854–1922), American painter and graphic artist
- Caroline Wormeley Latimer (1860–1933), American physiologist and writer
- Elizabeth Wormeley Latimer (1822–1904), English-American writer
- Christopher Wormeley (d. 1645), Governor of Tortuga and Virginia politician
- Katherine Prescott Wormeley (1830–1908), American nurse in the Civil War
- Ralph Wormeley Jr. (1651–1701), planter and politician
- Ralph Wormeley Sr. (d. 1651), Virginia colony tobacco planter and politician
- Ralph Wormeley (delegate) (1745–1806), Virginia planter, member of the Governor's Advisory Council
- Ralph Wormeley (Virginia politician) (1715–1789), planter and politician

== See also ==
- Wormeley Cottage, aka the Wormeley-Montague House, a historic home at Urbanna, Middlesex County, Virginia
- Warmley, a village in South Gloucestershire, England
- Wormley (disambiguation)
