= Caroline Latimer =

American physiologist

- Born: Caroline Wormeley Latimer; March 28, 1860; Baltimore, Maryland, U.S.
- Died: 1933 (aged 72–73)
- Education: Woman's Medical College of Baltimore; Bryn Mawr College
- Scientific career
- Fields: Psychology

Caroline Wormeley Latimer (March 28, 1860 – 1933) was an American physiologist known for her studies of rigor mortis and the salivary glands, and her popular science writing, which was widely read by women and girls.

== Early life ==
Latimer was born on March 28, 1860, in Baltimore, Maryland. She was the daughter of English-American author Elizabeth Wormeley Latimer and Randolph Brandt Latimer. Her siblings included Ralph Randolph Latimer and James Brandt Latimer, who worked for the Baltimore and Ohio Railroad and the Chicago, Burlington and Quincy Railroad.

Her paternal grandparents were Caroline (née Preble) Wormeley and Admiral Ralph Randolph Wormeley, a native of Virginia who was an Admiral of the British navy. Her maternal aunts included nurse and author Katherine Prescott Wormeley and Ariana Randolph Wormeley, was married to the American lawyer and banker Daniel Sargent Curtis.

== Career ==
Unusually, she attended medical school at the Woman's Medical College of Baltimore before she attended an undergraduate institution, and received her M.D. in 1890. She then studied for a bachelor's degree and master's degree in biology at Bryn Mawr College, where she graduated in 1896.

Following her graduation from Bryn Mawr, she became an instructor of biology at Goucher College until 1898, and a physician in Maryland until 1906. She was the associate editor of Appleton's Medical Dictionary beginning in 1915.

Latimer was the author of Girl and Woman. A Book for Mothers and Daughters, published by D. Appleton & Co. in New York in 1910.
