= La Maison du chat-qui-pelote =

1830 novel by Honoré de Balzac

The House of the Cat and Racket
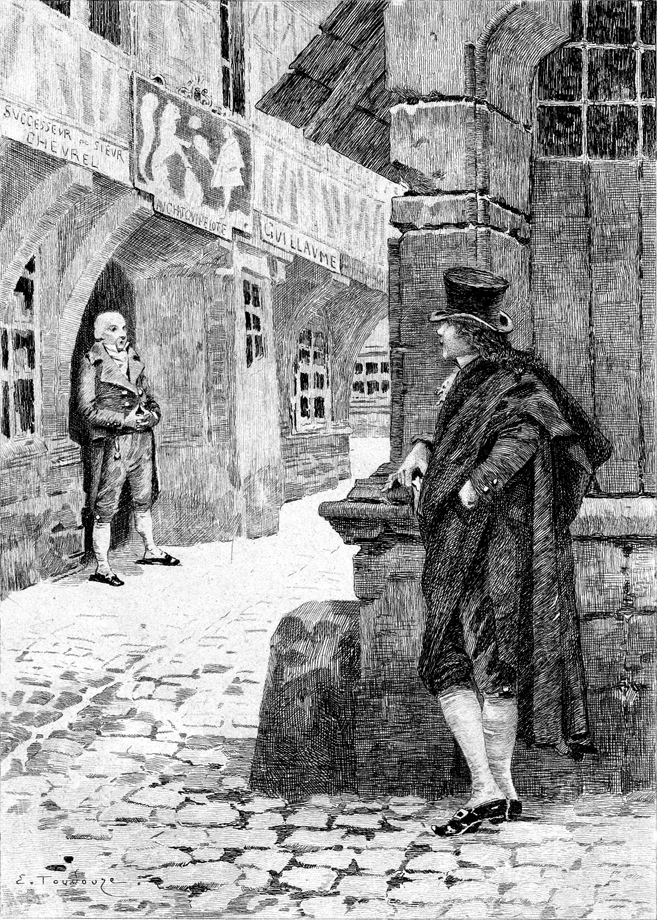
- Author: Honoré de Balzac
- Original title: La Maison du chat-qui-pelote
- Working title: Gloire et malheur
- Translators: May Tomlinson, Katherine Prescott Wormeley, Clara Bell, Philip Kent
- Cover artist: Édouard Toudouze
- Language: French
- Series: La Comédie humaine, Scènes de la vie privée
- Publisher: Mame-Delaunay
- Publication date: 1830
- Publication place: France
- Followed by: Le Bal de Sceaux

La Maison du chat-qui-pelote (The House of the Cat and Racket) is a novel by Honoré de Balzac. It is the opening work in the Scènes de la vie privée (transl. Scenes of Private Life), which comprises the first volume of Balzac's La Comédie humaine.

First entitled Gloire et malheur (Glory and Misfortune), this short novel was completed at Maffliers in October 1829 and published by Mame-Delaunay in 1830. The first edition was followed by four revised editions. The final edition, published by Furne in 1842, appeared under the title of La Maison du chat-qui-pelote and was itself corrected indefinitely.

The idea for the story came from the haberdashery business run by the Sallambiers on the maternal side of Balzac's family.

The work is dedicated to Mademoiselle Marie de Montheau.

== Plot ==
The artist Théodore de Sommervieux falls in love with Augustine Guillaume, the daughter of a conservative cloth merchant, whose house of business on the rue Saint-Denis in Paris is known by sign of the Cat and Racket. Théodore, a winner of the Prix de Rome and a knight of the Legion of Honor, is famous for his interiors and chiaroscuro effects in imitation of the Dutch School. He makes an excellent reproduction of the interior of the Cat and Racket, which is exhibited at the Salon alongside a strikingly modern portrait of Augustine. The affair blossoms with the help of Madame Guillaume's younger cousin Madame Roguin, who is already acquainted with Théodore. The lovers become engaged, somewhat against the best wishes of Augustine's parents, who had originally intended her to marry Monsieur Guillaume's clerk Joseph Lebas. In 1808 Augustine marries Théodore at the local church of Saint-Leu; on the same day her elder sister Virginie marries Lebas.

The marriage is not a happy one. Augustine adores Sommervieux but is incapable of understanding him as an artist. Although she is more refined than her parents, her education and social standing leave her too far below the level of her husband to allow a meeting of minds to take place. Théodore's passion for her cools and she is treated with disdain by his fellow artists. Théodore instead finds a kindred soul in the Duchesse de Carigliano, to whom he gives the famous portrait of Augustine and to whom he becomes hopelessly attached, neglecting his rooms on the rue des Trois-Frères (now a part of the rue Taitbout).

Realizing after three years of unhappiness that her marriage is falling apart and having been informed by a malicious gossip of Théodore's attachment to the duchess, Augustine visits Madame de Carigliano not to ask her to give her back her husband's heart but to learn the arts by which it has been captured. The duchess warns her against trying to conquer a man's heart through love, which will only allow the husband to tyrannize over the wife; instead a woman must use all the arts of coquetry that nature puts at her disposal. Augustine is shocked to learn that Madame de Carigliano sees marriage as a form of warfare. The duchess then returns to Augustine her own portrait, telling her that if she cannot conquer her husband with this weapon, she is not a woman.

Augustine, however, does not understand how to turn such a weapon against her husband. She hangs the portrait in her bedroom and dresses herself exactly as she appears in it, believing that Théodore will see her once again as the young woman he fell in love with at the sign of the Cat and Racket. But when the artist sees the portrait hanging in her bedroom and asks how it came to be there, she foolishly reveals that it was returned to her by the Duchesse de Carigliano. "You demanded it from her?" he asks. "I did not know that she had it", replies Augustine. Théodore realizes that his wife is incapable of seeing the painting as he sees it - a consummate work of art. Instead of falling in love with its subject, he regards its return as a slap in the face from his mistress. His vanity wounded, he throws a fit and destroys the portrait, vowing vengeance upon the duchess.

By morning Augustine has become resigned to her fate. Her loveless marriage comes to an end shortly thereafter when she dies of a broken heart at the age of twenty-seven.

== English translations ==
La Maison du chat-qui-pelote has been translated into English at least four times: as The Cat and Battledore by Philip Kent for Sampson Low in 1879, as At the Sign of the Cat and Racket by Clara Bell for the Saintsbury Edition of The Human Comedy in 1895, as Fame and Sorrow by Katharine Prescott Wormeley for Roberts Brothers in 1896, and as The House of the Cat and Racket by May Tomlinson for George Barrie & Son/Caxton Press, also in 1896. Bell's translation is based on the corrected Furne edition of Balzac's works, which is generally considered definitive.

== See also ==
- Repertory of the Comedie Humaine
