= An Interior in Venice =

Painting by John Singer Sargent

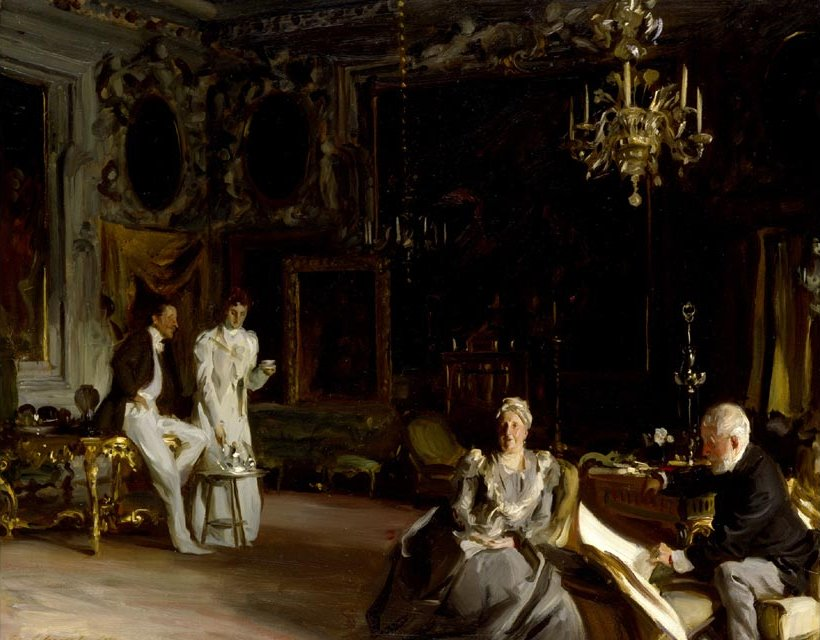
- Artist: John Singer Sargent
- Year: 1899
- Medium: Oil on canvas
- Dimensions: 66 cm × 83.5 cm (26 in × 32.9 in)
- Location: Royal Academy of Art; London

An Interior in Venice is an 1899 oil on canvas painting by John Singer Sargent set inside the Palazzo Barbaro. The work is held in the permanent collection of the Royal Academy of Art in London.

In the work Sargent depicts the American expatriate couple Daniel and Ariana Curtis and their son Ralph and his wife Lisa, in their Venetian home, which legendarily hosted such famed visual artists and writers as Robert Browning, Claude Monet, Henry James, and Singer Sargent (who was part of the same extended family as Daniel Sargent Curtis) himsef.

The canvas is noted for the shimmering Venetian light sparkling on the canal as it articulates the decorous gilt features in the room and the carvings therein, The painting was given as a gift from Singer Sargent to Ariana Curtis, who rejected the bequest because she considered certain features in the depictions an affront to decorum.

Henry James ironically in turn said of it to Ariana Curtis "...absolutely and without reserve adored [it]. . . . I’ve seen few things that I craved more to possess! I hope you haven’t altogether let it go.” Meanwhile fellow painter James McNeill Whistler referred to it as "Sargent's little painting" and further described it as "smudges everywhere".

== See also ==
- List of works by John Singer Sargent
