= Mémoires de deux jeunes mariées =

1841 novel by Honoré de Balzac

Letters of Two Brides
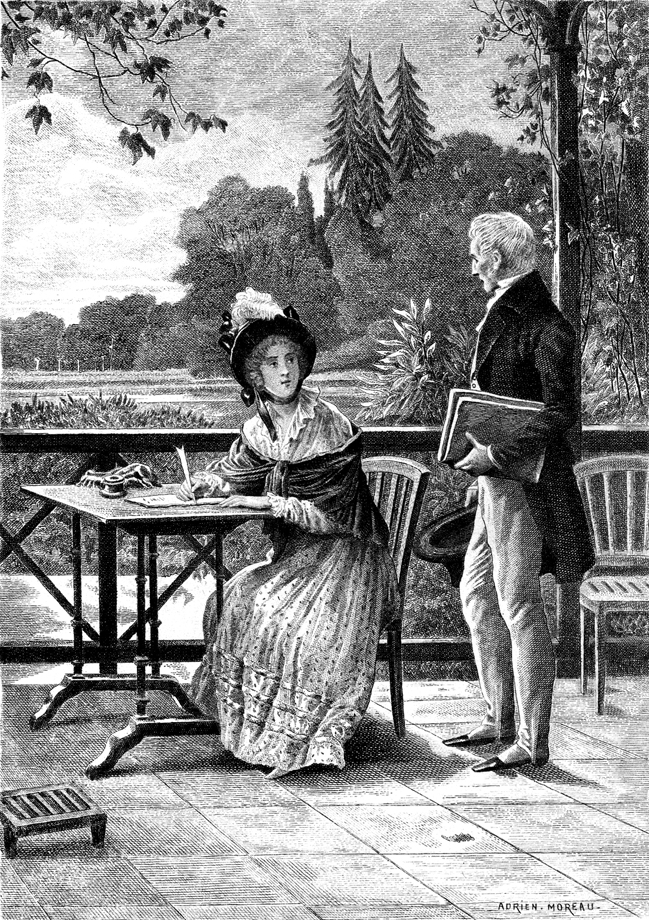
- Author: Honoré de Balzac
- Original title: Mémoires de deux jeunes mariées
- Translator: R. S. Scott
- Illustrator: Adrien Moreau
- Language: French
- Series: La Comédie Humaine
- Genre: Scènes de la vie privée
- Publisher: Furne
- Publication date: 1842
- Publication place: France
- English publication date: 1898
- Preceded by: Le Bal de Sceaux
- Followed by: La Bourse

Mémoires de deux jeunes mariées (Letters of Two Brides) is an epistolary novel by the French writer Honoré de Balzac. It was serialized in the French newspaper La Presse in 1841 and published by Furne in 1842 as the first work in the second volume (Scènes de la vie privée, tome II or Scenes from Private Life, Volume 2) of Balzac's La Comédie humaine. It was dedicated to the French novelist George Sand. The 1902 English translation of the novel included a preface by Henry James.

== History of the text ==
Letters of Two Brides grew out of two earlier works which Balzac never completed: Mémoires d'une jeune femme (Memoirs of A Young Woman), which was written in 1834, and Sœur Marie des Anges (Sister Marie des Anges), which was probably written around 1835. In 1840, Balzac informed his future wife Ewelina Hańska of his intention to write an epistolary novel: "I am writing an epistolary novel, though I do not know what title to give it, as Soeur Marie des Anges is too long, and that would only apply to the first part." In June 1841, Balzac wrote again to Mme Hanska: "I have just finished Mémoires de deux jeunes mariées". The manuscript to which this letter refers is no longer extant.

On 10 November 1841, Balzac's editor Hippolyte Souverain authorized the serialization of the novel in the French journal La Presse. The editor of the journal, however, bowdlerized Balzac's text. Between 26 November and 6 December 1841 letters I through XXV, which comprised part one of the novel, were serialized. Part two (letters XXVI through XLVII) and part three (letters XLVIII through LIX) were serialized between then and 1 January 1842. The serialization had neither a foreword nor a dedication.

The first Furne edition, which faithfully reproduced Balzac's original text, appeared in two volumes in January 1842. This edition included a foreword (dated "Les Jardies, May 1840") and a dedication to George Sand. The original division of the novel into three parts was retained.

The second edition appeared on 3 September 1842 as part of Furne's publication of La Comédie humaine. Letters of Two Brides was the first book in the second volume of the series, Scènes de la vie privée(Scenes from Private Life), followed by A Daughter of Eve. For this edition Balzac removed the foreword and divided the novel into two parts. He also altered the date of the foreword to "Paris, 1841".

There exists a final revision of the text in Balzac's own hand in the Lovenjoul Collection. In this revision Canalis replaces M. de Saint-Héreen, and the dates of letters XLVIII, XLIX and LI have been altered.

The fragmentary Sœur Marie des Anges was to form part of the series of works known as Scènes de la vie parisienne (Scenes from Parisian Life). However, this fragment has little in common with Letters of Two Brides; it is not in epistolary form and its plot is quite different. Its relation to the later novel has still not been satisfactorily explained. A character called Mère Marie des Anges, the superior of the Ursuline convent at Arcis-sur-Aube, appears in another of Balzac's novels, The Member for Arcis, as do a number of characters from Letters of Two Brides.

== Plot ==
The story concerns two young French women, Louise de Chaulieu (1805–1835) and Renée de Maucombe (born 1807), who become close friends during their novitiate at the Carmelite convent of Blois. When they leave the convent, however, their lives follow two very different paths. Louise chooses a life of romance, whereas Renée takes a much more pragmatic approach; but their friendship is preserved through their correspondence, which continues for a dozen years from 1823 through 1835.

Louise is expected to sacrifice herself for her two brothers and take the veil, but the young girl refuses to submit to such a fate. Her dying grandmother intercedes on her behalf and bequeaths her her fortune, thereby rescuing her from the enclosed life of a Carmelite nun and leaving her financially independent. Free to assist her brothers financially without having to sacrifice her own ambitions, Louise settles in Paris and throws herself into a life of Italian operas, masqued balls and romantic intrigues. She falls in love with an unbecoming but noble Spaniard, Felipe Hénarez, Baron de Macumer. Banished from Spain, he lives incognito in Paris where he is forced to support himself by teaching Spanish. When he regains his fortune and noble standing, he woos Louise with a romantic fervour that finally wins her over. The pair are married in March 1825. They live a life of carefree happiness, but Louise's jealousy embitters him and leads to his physical break-down. He dies in 1829, leaving a grieving widow of twenty-four.

Renée de Maucombe's attitude to love and life are in marked contrast to those of Louise. When she leaves the convent at Blois Renée moves to Provence, where she marries an older man of little wealth or standing whom she can hardly be said to love. She bears Louis de L'Estorade three children, and over the course of the next decade she devotes herself body and soul to the happiness of her family. Gradually she grows to love her husband in her own way, and with her encouragement he makes a career for himself in local politics, which culminates in his becoming a peer of France and a grand officer of the Legion of Honour. During this time Renée is quite scathing in her criticisms of Louise, whom she sees as a selfish and self-indulgent coquette. True happiness for a woman lies in motherhood and devotion to her family.

Meanwhile, four years after the death of Felipe, Louise falls in love again. This time the object of her love is a poor poet and playwright Marie Gaston, who is several years younger than she is. As though taking a leaf out of Renée's book, Louise sells her Parisian property, moves to a chalet in Ville-d'Avray (a small village near Paris) and lives a life of seclusion with her new husband. But Renée is not fooled by this masquerade. Louise, she warns, is still living a life devoted to selfishness and self-indulgence, while true happiness lies only in self-sacrifice to one's husband and children - Louise remains childless.

After a few years of apparent bliss, Louise detects a change in her husband. He becomes solicitous about the financial success of his plays, and a large sum of money goes missing. Suspecting him of having an expensive mistress, Louise makes enquiries and comes to the shocking conclusion that he has another family in Paris – an Englishwoman known by the name Madame Gaston, and two children, who look remarkably like Marie. Louise confides her feelings of despair to Renée and announces her determination to commit suicide rather than to submit to such a fate. Renée's husband makes enquiries and discovers the truth of the situation. Madame Gaston is the widow of Marie's brother. The death of her husband has left her financially destitute and Marie has taken it upon himself to assist her and his two nephews, but he is ashamed to ask his wife for money. Reneé writes to Louise to inform her of the truth and rushes to the chalet, but she is too late. Louise has contracted consumption by lying out in the dew overnight and she dies a few days later.

== English translations ==
- Katherine Prescott Wormeley: Memoirs of Two Young Married Women (Roberts Bros., 1894)
- R. S. Scott: Letters of Two Brides (J. M. Dent, 1897)
- Lady Mary Loyd: The Two Young Brides (1902)
- Jordan Stump: The Memoirs of Two Young Wives (New York Review Books, 2018)

== See also ==
- Repertory Of The Comedie Humaine
