= Le Bal de Sceaux =

The Ball at Sceaux
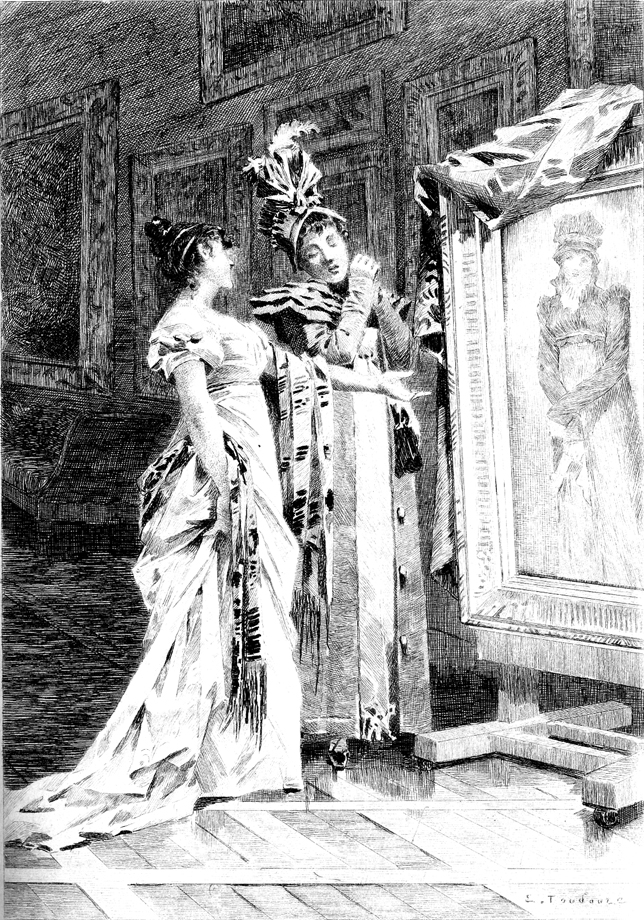
- Illustration by Édouard Toudouze.
- Author: Honoré de Balzac
- Original title: Le Bal de Sceaux
- Translator: Clara Bell
- Language: French
- Series: La Comédie Humaine
- Genre: Scènes de la vie privée
- Publisher: Mame et Delaunay-Vallée
- Publication date: 1830
- Publication place: France
- Preceded by: La Maison du chat-qui-pelote
- Followed by: Mémoires de deux jeunes mariées

Le Bal de Sceaux (French pronunciation: [lə bal də so], The Ball at Sceaux) is the fifth work of Honoré de Balzac, one of the oldest texts of la Comédie Humaine.

The first edition of this novella was published in 1830 by Mame and Delaunay-Vallée in the Scènes de la vie privée (Scenes of Private Life). It was republished in 1835 by Madame Charles-Béchet, in 1839 in the Charpentier edition, and then in 1842 in the first volume of the Furne edition of la Comédie Humaine.

== Analysis ==
In writing this novella Balzac seems to have been inspired by the fables of La Fontaine, especially La fille ("The Girl") and Héron ("The Heron"). There is also an allusion to La Fontaine in the choice of Émilie's surname. The plot is similar to that of another of Balzac's works, La Vieille Fille (The Old Maid), the subject of which hesitates between several suitors and finishes by making do with the only one left.

== Plot ==
After having refused a number of suitors, under the pretext that they are not peers of France, Émilie de Fontaine falls in love with a mysterious young man who quietly appeared at the village dance at Sceaux. Despite his refined appearance and aristocratic bearing, the unknown, Maximilien Longueville, reveals nothing of his identity and appears interested only in his sickly sister. However, he is not insensible to Émilie's attention and accepts an invitation from her father, the Comte de Fontaine. Émilie and Maximilien soon fall in love. The Comte de Fontaine, concerned for his daughter, decides to investigate this mysterious young man, and he discovers him on the Rue du Sentier, a simple cloth merchant, which horrifies Émilie. Later, she learns why he secretly tended a store: he did it in order to support his family, sacrificing himself for his sick sister and for his brother, who had departed the country.

Piqued, she marries a 72-year-old uncle for his title of Vice Admiral, the Comte de Kergarouët.

Several years after her marriage, Émilie discovers that Maximilien is no longer working as a clothier but has become the Vicomte de Longueville, a Peer of France.

== See also ==
- Repertory Of The Comedie Humaine
