= Ralph Wormeley Curtis =

American painter

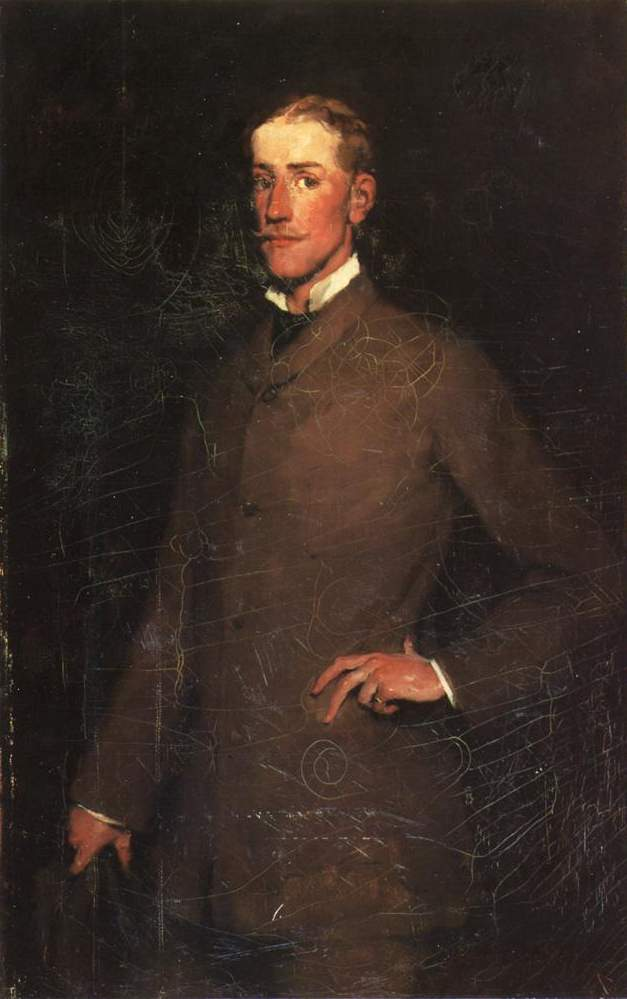
- Portrait of Curtis by Frank Duveneck, c. 1878
- Born: August 28, 1854; Boston, Massachusetts, U.S.
- Died: February 4, 1922 (aged 67); Beaulieu-sur-Mer, France
- Education: Harvard University; Académie Julian
- Spouse: Lisa de Wolfe Colt (after 1897)
- Parent(s): Daniel Sargent Curtis; Ariana Randolph Wormeley

Ralph Wormeley Curtis (August 28, 1854 – February 4, 1922) was an American painter and graphic artist in the Impressionist style. He spent most of his life in Europe, where he was a close associate of his distants cousins, John Singer Sargent and Francis Brooks Chadwick, and James McNeill Whistler. He painted in a variety of genres, but was known mostly for landscapes and urban scenes; especially of Venice.

== Early life ==
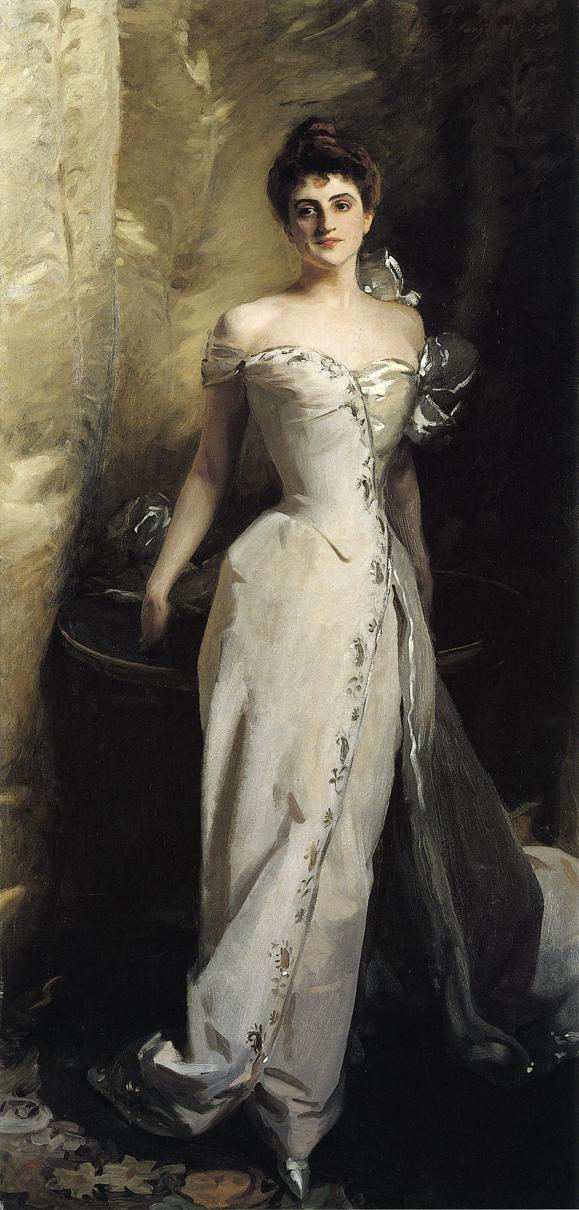
Mrs. Ralph Curtis (Lisa de Wolfe Colt), John Singer Sargent, 1898

Curtis was born in Boston on August 28, 1854. His father was the prominent lawyer and banker, Daniel Sargent Curtis and his mother was Ariana Randolph Wormeley (1834–1922), a sister of Elizabeth Wormeley Latimer, both descendants of John Randolph (1727–1784).

His maternal grandfather, Ralph Randolph Wormeley, born in Virginia to loyalist parents, was raised in London and joined the Royal Navy, rising to the rank of admiral, while his grandmother, Caroline Preble, was from a venerable Boston family. His mother was therefore born and raised in London and returned to the United States in 1848.

He spent much of his childhood in the affluent village of Chestnut Hill. After attending some preparatory academies, including G. W. C. Noble's school in Boston, he studied law at Harvard University where, in 1876, he was a member of Hasty Pudding Club and one of the co-founders of The Harvard Lampoon.

== Career ==
Upon graduating, he convinced his parents to let him study art. He began at the Académie Julian in Paris, where he studied with Gustave Boulanger, Jules-Joseph Lefebvre and the history painter, Joseph-Nicolas Robert-Fleury. Upon completing his work there, he found a position in the studios of Carolus-Duran. It was there he first met John Singer Sargent, who would not only become a close friend, but also have a significant influence on his style.

In 1878, his parents moved to Europe; spending some time in Rome, where he paid them a visit and took more painting lessons. Eventually, they would settle in Venice, where they bought the Palazzo Barbaro, which would become a cultural meeting place. One of their frequent guests was James McNeill Whistler, who would also become Curtis' friend and influence his style. Meanwhile, Curtis opened his own studio in Paris. In 1880, he and Sargent visited the Netherlands to copy the works of Frans Hals and mingled with the art colony in Scheveningen.

From 1881 through 1893, he was a regular exhibitor at the Salon and, in 1889, received Honorable Mention at the Exposition Universelle. He also had showings at the Royal Academy of Arts, the Grosvenor Gallery and the Manchester Art Gallery. He apparently made little money from his paintings and relied on his family's wealth for support.

== Personal life ==
On June 6, 1897, he married Lisa de Wolfe (née Colt) Rotch (1871–1933) of Providence. Lisa, a daughter of George D'Wolf Colt, who was related to the Colt firearms family. Together, they were the parents of:

- Sylvia Curtis (1899–1981), married Alexander Steinert Jr. of Boston. They divorced and in 1947 she married Schuyler Owen (a descendant of signer of the Declaration of Independence, Richard Stockton).
- Ralph Wormely Curtis (1908–1973), who married Cesarine Amelia Marie Harjes (1899–1949), the eldest surviving daughter of banker Henry Herman Harjes (a partner of J.P. Morgan in Paris), in 1930.

After the birth of their daughter, Sylvia, they moved to Beaulieu-sur-Mer, a seaside village on the French Riviera between Nice and Monaco, where they had two more children.

Curtis died at Beaulieu-sur-Mer on February 4, 1922.

== Selected paintings ==
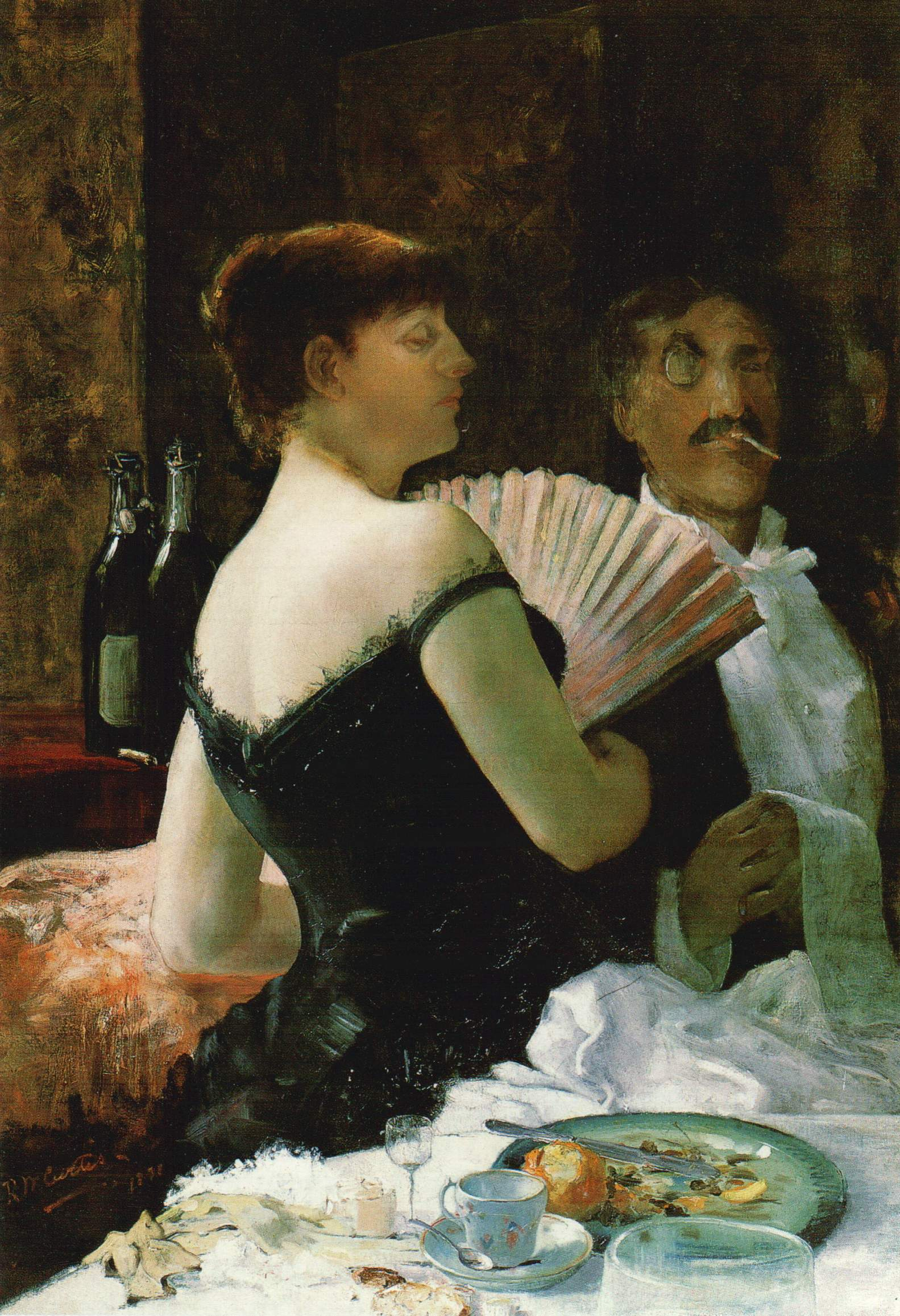
Whistler at a Party

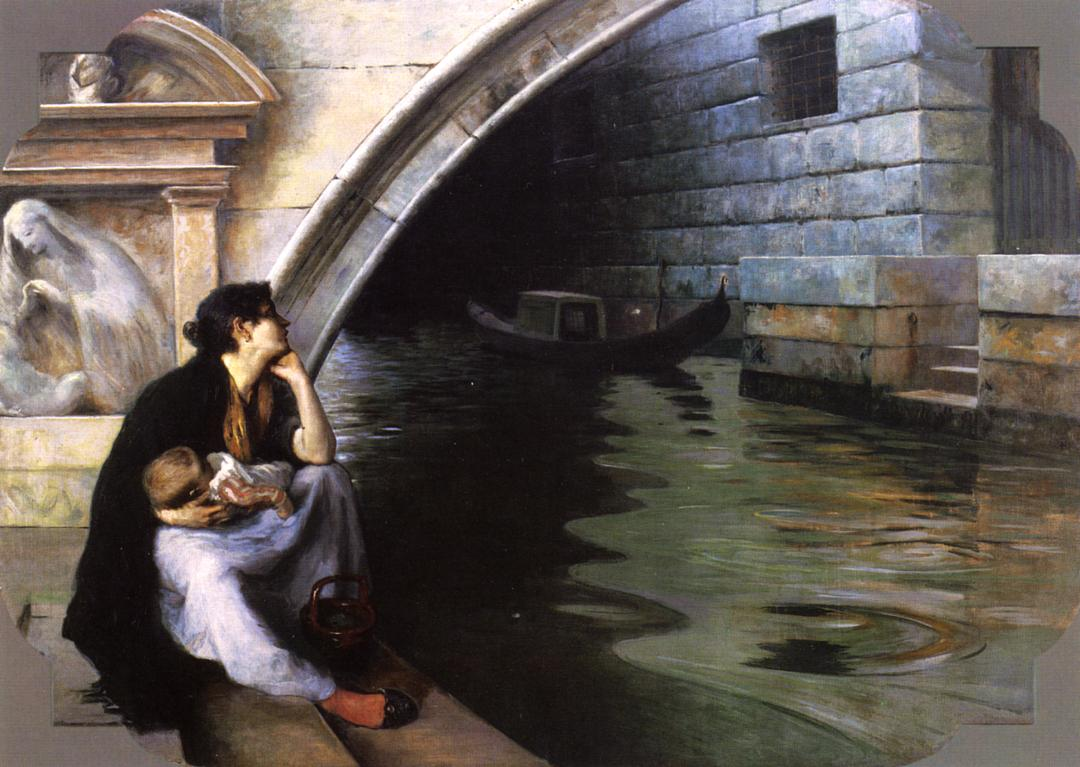
The Bridge of Sighs

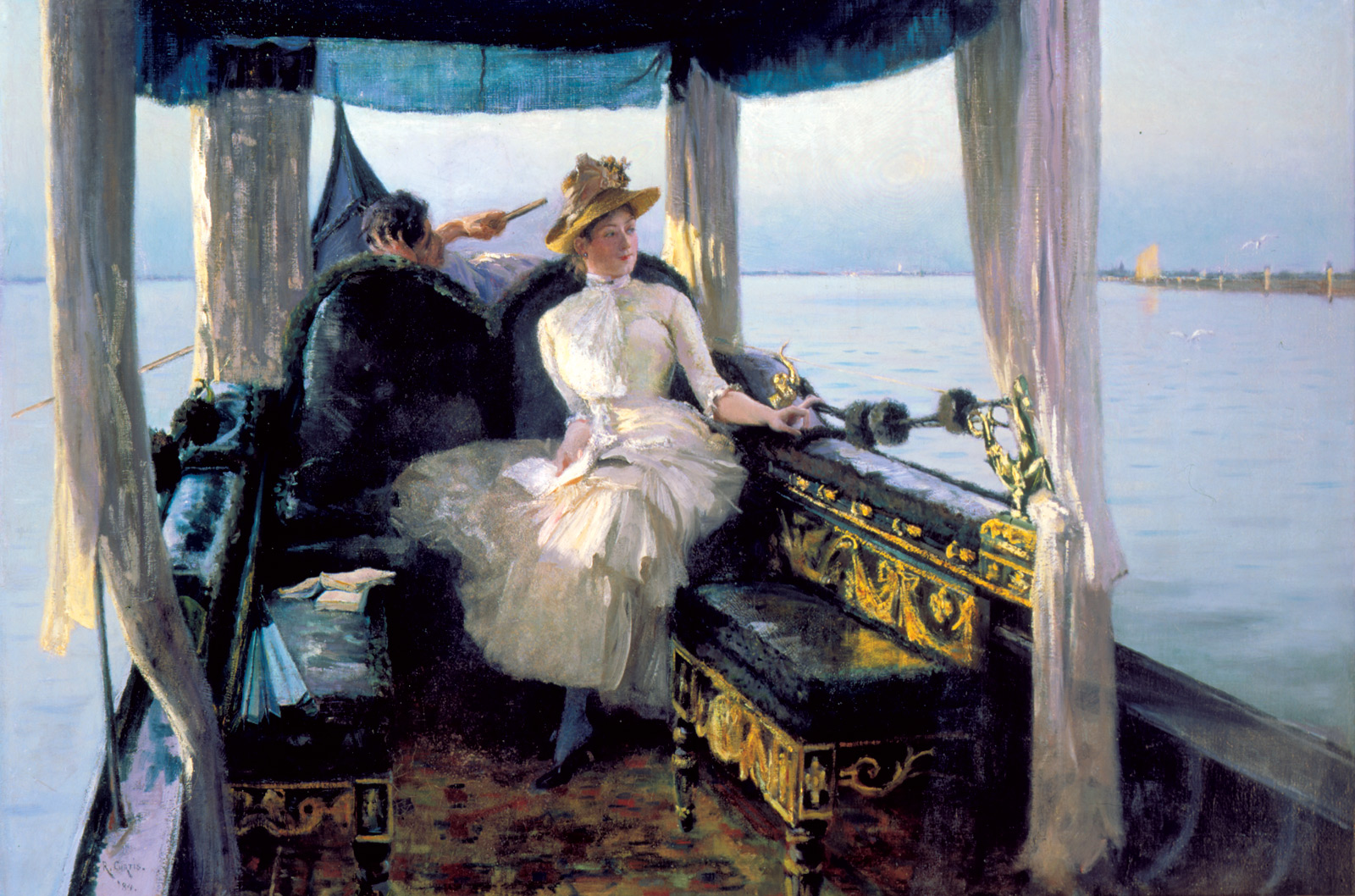
Drifting with the Tide, Ralph Curtis

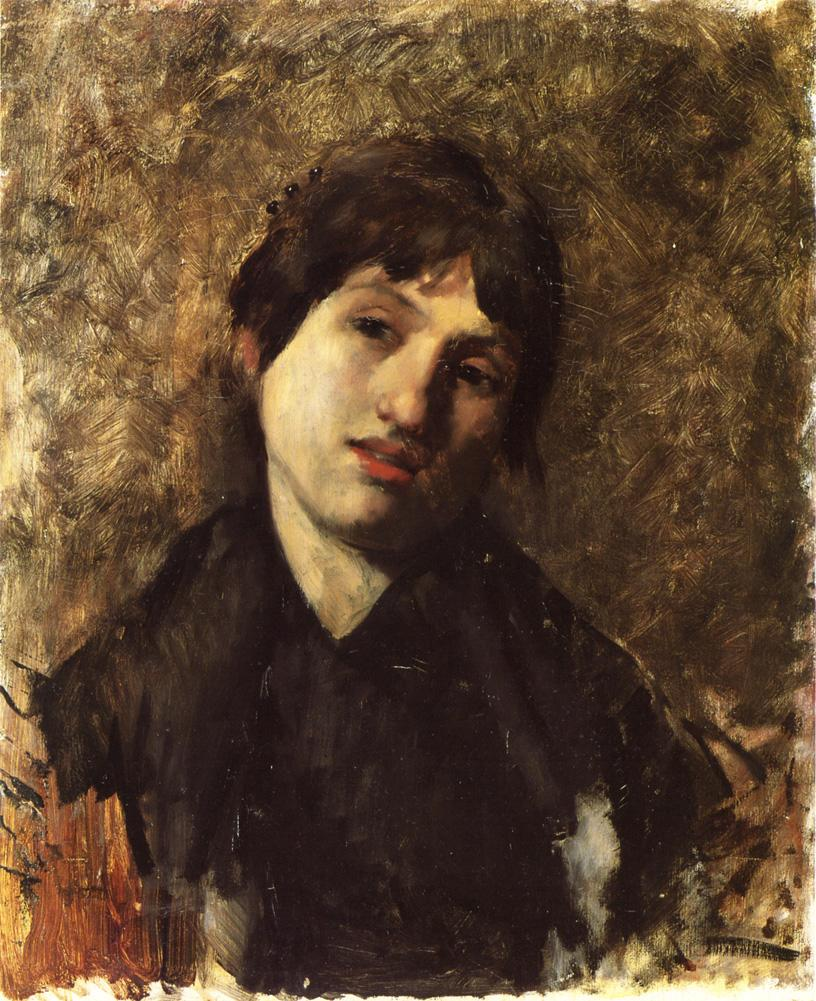
Portrait of a
Young Woman

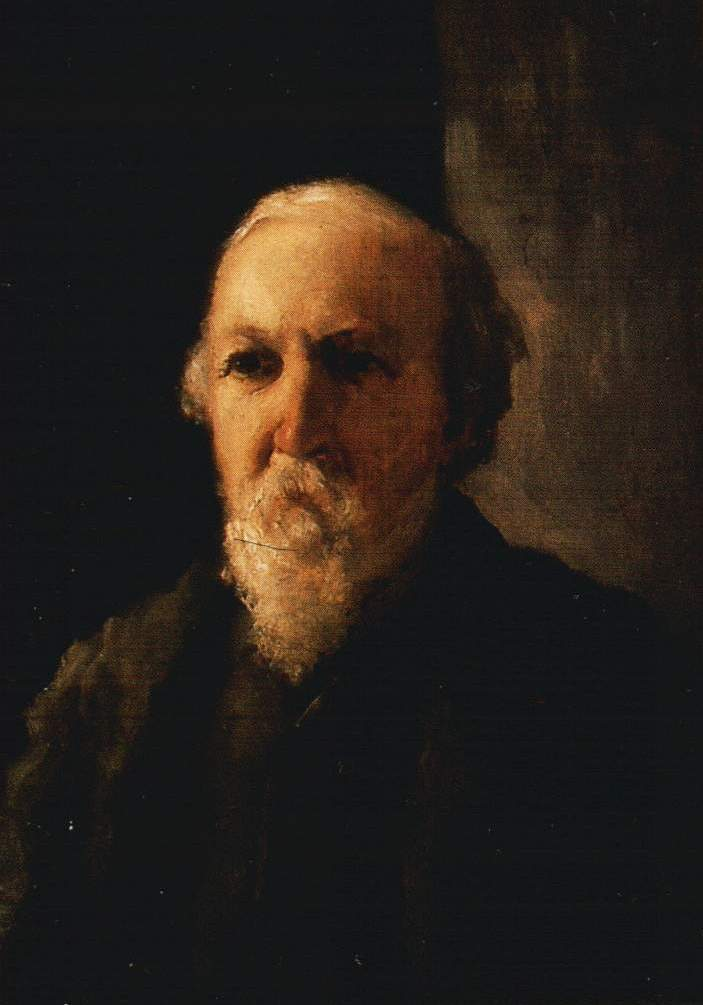
Portrait of
Robert Browning
