= Daniel Sargent Curtis =

American lawyer

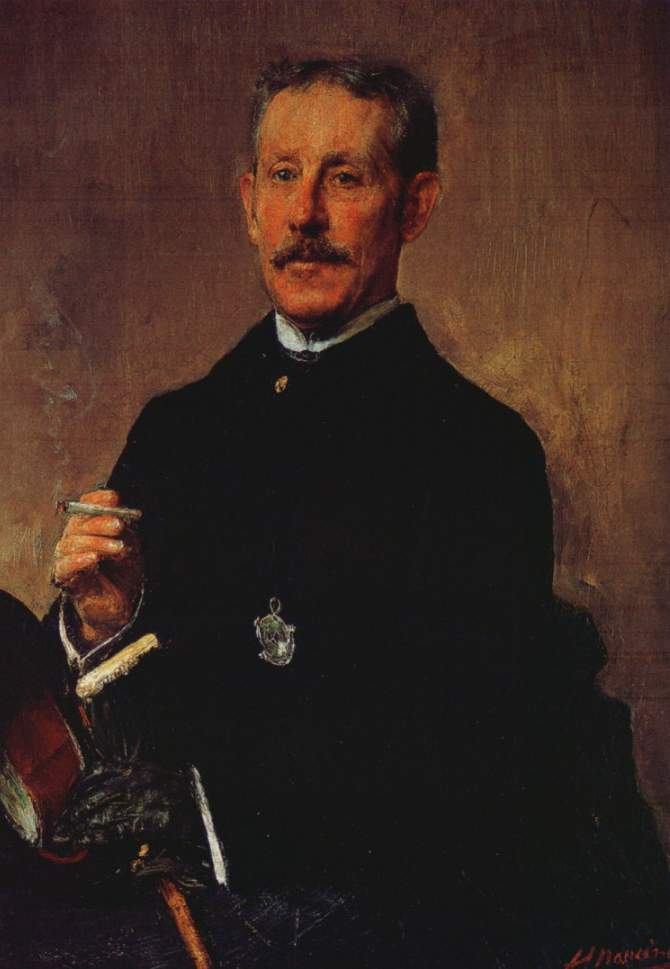
- Portrait of Curtis by Antonio Mancini, c. 1880s
- Born: 1825; Boston, Massachusetts
- Died: 1908 (aged 82–83); Venice, Italy
- Education: Harvard University; Harvard Law School
- Spouse: Ariana Randolph Wormeley (m. 1853)
- Children: Osborne Sargent Curtis; Ralph Wormeley Curtis
- Parent(s): Thomas Buckminster Curtis; Maria Osborne Sargent
- Relatives: Daniel Sargent (grandfather); Henry Osborne Curtis (grandson)

Daniel Sargent Curtis (1825–1908) was an American lawyer and banker. He was a trustee of the Boston Public Library, director of the Boston National Bank and owner of Palazzi Barbaro, Venice.

== Early life ==
Curtis was born in Boston, Massachusetts to Thomas Buckminster Curtis and Maria Osborne Sargent. His maternal grandfather was Daniel Sargent, close friend of American President, John Quincy Adams. The Sargent extended family, an old Bostonian family whose ancestors arrived in America on the Mayflower, included artist John Singer Sargent, Henry Sargent, and Lucius Manlius Sargent. His aunt, Nancy Brown (1794–1876), later known as Anne Sargent Gage, married Dr. Leander Gage (1792–1842), and had eight children, his only first cousins. His grandfather had her out of wedlock and attempted to distance himself from her throughout his lifetime.

Curtis was a graduate of Harvard University in 1846 and of Harvard Law School in 1848.

== Life in Italy ==
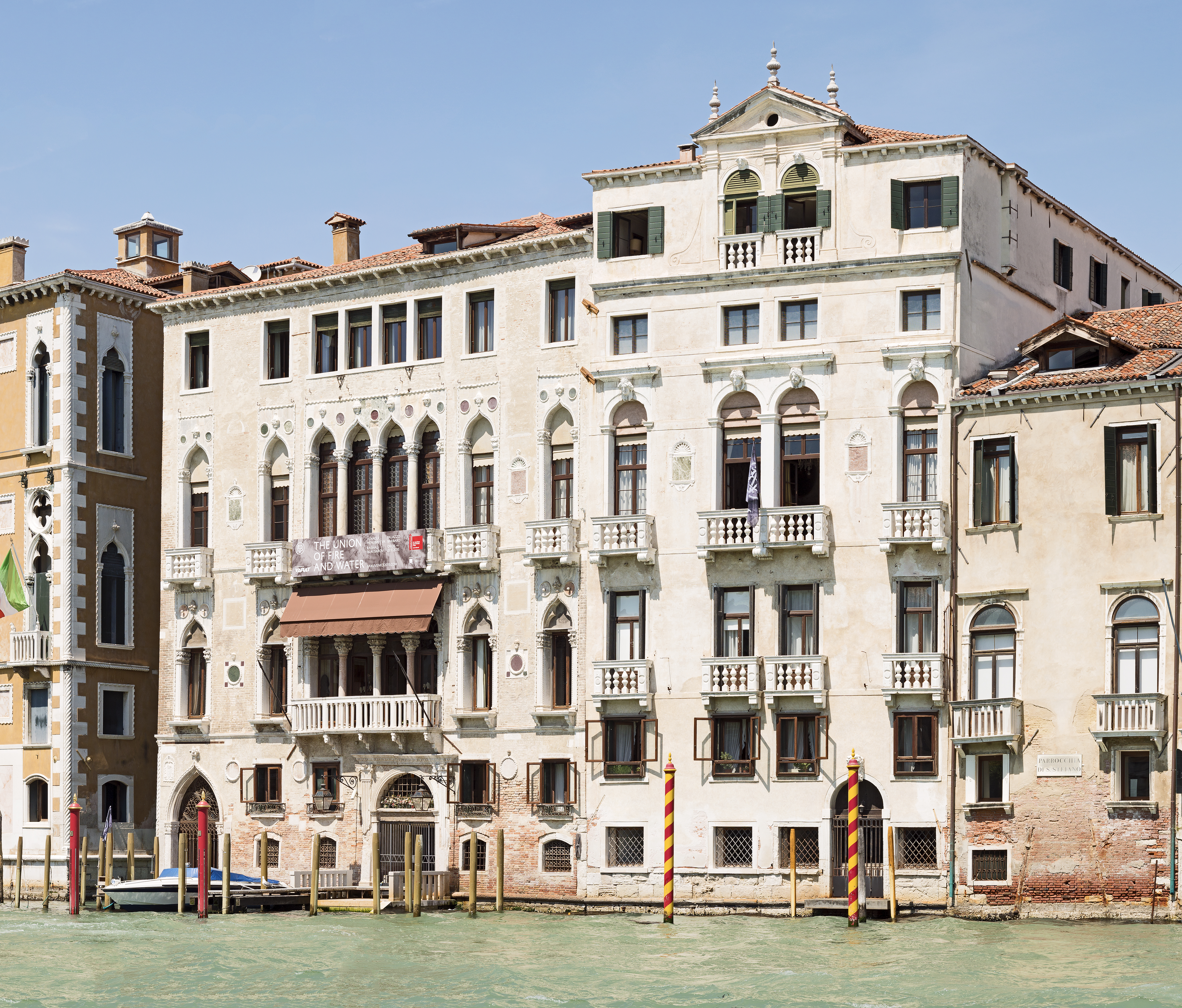
The Palazzo Barbaro, bought by Curtis in 1885.

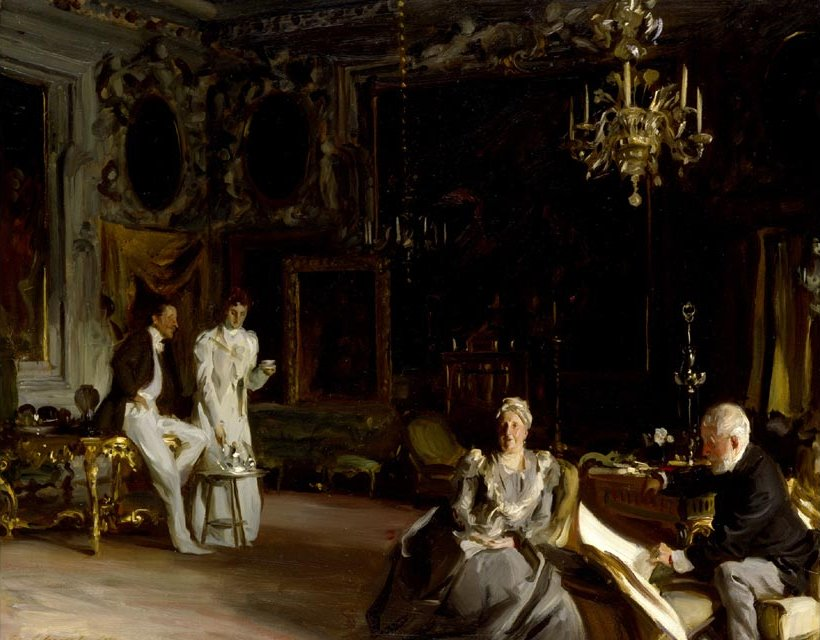
John Singer Sargent's portrait of the Curtis family at the Palazzo Barbaro, 1899

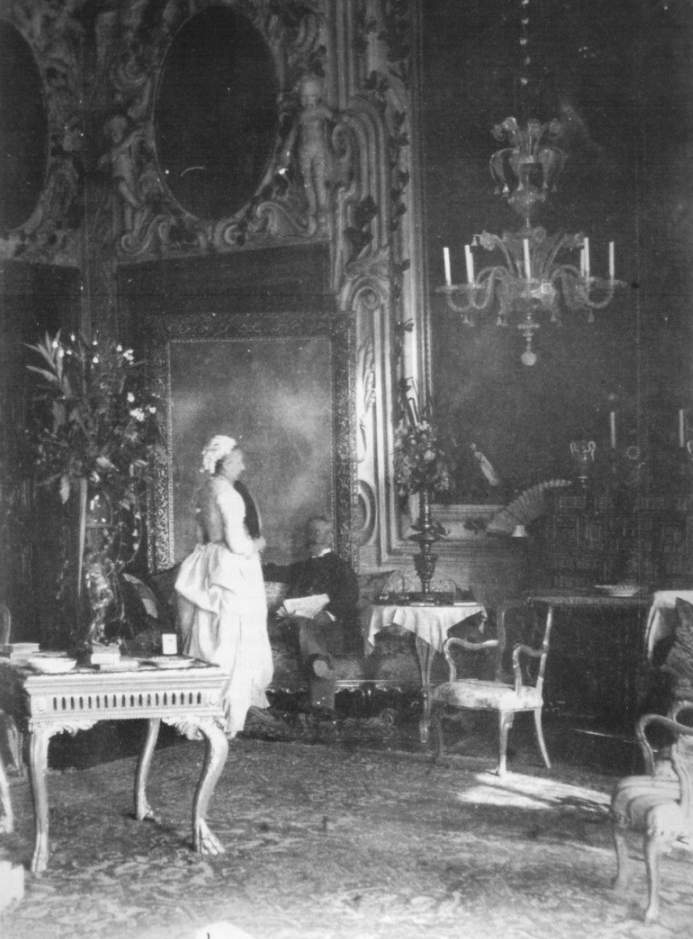
Ariana and Daniel Curtis in the Salone of the Palazzo, c. 1888

The Curtises left Boston in 1877 and got to Venice in 1880 where they lived most of their lives except for the many travels they took abroad, renting the palace when not at home. Beginning in 1881, they first rented a part of Palazzo Barbaro when in Venice but later, in 1885, they bought the second floor and the upper floors for $13,500. Ariana said the palace was worth much more because its value shouldn't be set by the number of rooms but by its original 18th century decorations. After it was sold by the last of the Barbaros the palace was in great decay and most of its original decoration, above all the paintings, were gone. The Curtises begun a thorough restoration and kept the palace with love and dedication bringing it back to social and cultural life and making it the meeting place for some cosmopolitan Americans of the time.

Other non-American visitors were also there to visit or entertain the hosts, among others the British poet Robert Browning who was a regular at the Palazzo during his stays in Venice. Daniel developed a true friendship with the poet, and they spent many hours together including casual walks at the Lido. He gave his last public reading for the Curtises and their guests in November 1889 some thirty days before his death.

Isabella Stewart Gardner, an art collector and the foremost patron of the arts in her time, fell in love with Palazzo Barbaro, renting it several times from 1890 when the Curtis' were travelling. When she went back to Boston, she built her "Venetian Palazzo", an interpretation of the Renaissance palaces of Venice.

John Singer Sargent, Henry James, Whistler, and Claude Monet were just some of the many artists who gathered there. Other members of the "Barbaro Circle" included Bernard Berenson, William Merritt Chase, and Edith Wharton. Another supporter of the circle was Charles Eliot Norton. Curtis is depicted along with his wife Ariana, son Ralph, and daughter-in-law Lisa in the 1899 Singer Sargent painting An Interior in Venice, set in his Venetian home the Palazzo Barbaro.

Curtis's unpublished diary is held at the Biblioteca Marciana in Venice.

== Personal life ==
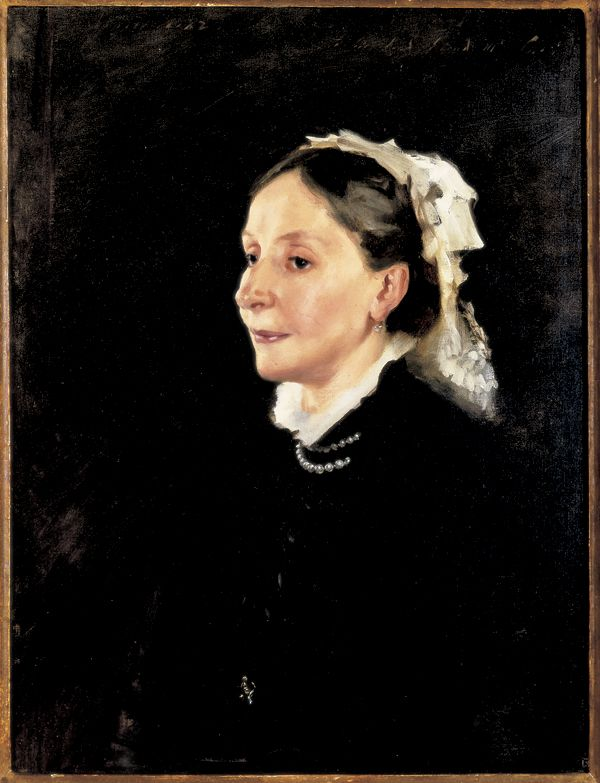
Portrait of his wife, Ariana Randolph Wormeley Curtis, John Singer Sargent, 1882

In 1853, he married Ariana Randolph Wormeley (1833–1922) in Newport, a sister of Elizabeth Wormeley Latimer, both descendants of John Randolph (1727–1784). As Ariana's father was an officer in the Royal Navy, she was born and raised in London. They returned to the United States in 1848. Daniel and Ariana settled in Boston where their sons were born:

- Ralph Wormeley Curtis (1854–1922), an artist who married Lisa de Wolfe Colt in 1897.
- Osborne Sargent Curtis (1858-1918), a graduate of Trinity College, Cambridge, who married Frances Henrietta Gandy.

Daniel generously donated volumes to the Boston Public Library's collections during his trusteeship. Daniel and Ariana resided at the Palazzo Barbaro until their deaths, and their heirs still own it.

=== Descendants ===
His grandson through his son Osborne, Major-general Henry Osborne Curtis (1888–1964), was a British Army officer who saw service in both World War I and World War II who was awarded the Companion of the Order of the Bath, the Distinguished Service Order, the Military Cross, and the U.S. Army Distinguished Service Medal.

His granddaughter through his son Ralph, Sylvia Curtis (b. 1893) was married to Alexander Steinert with whom she had two sons, Russell Curtis Steinert (1927–2010) and Theodore Alexander Steinert. After their divorce, she married Schuyler Owen, son of Mrs. G. Fisher Owen of Millrace House, Hope, New Jersey and George Ferry Owen of Miami, in 1947. Owen was a descendant of Richard Stockton, a signer of the Declaration of Independence, and David Rittenhouse, an early professor of Astronomy at the University of Pennsylvania.
