= Palazzi Barbaro, Venice =

Palaces in Venice

Coordinates: 45.4317°N 12.33°E

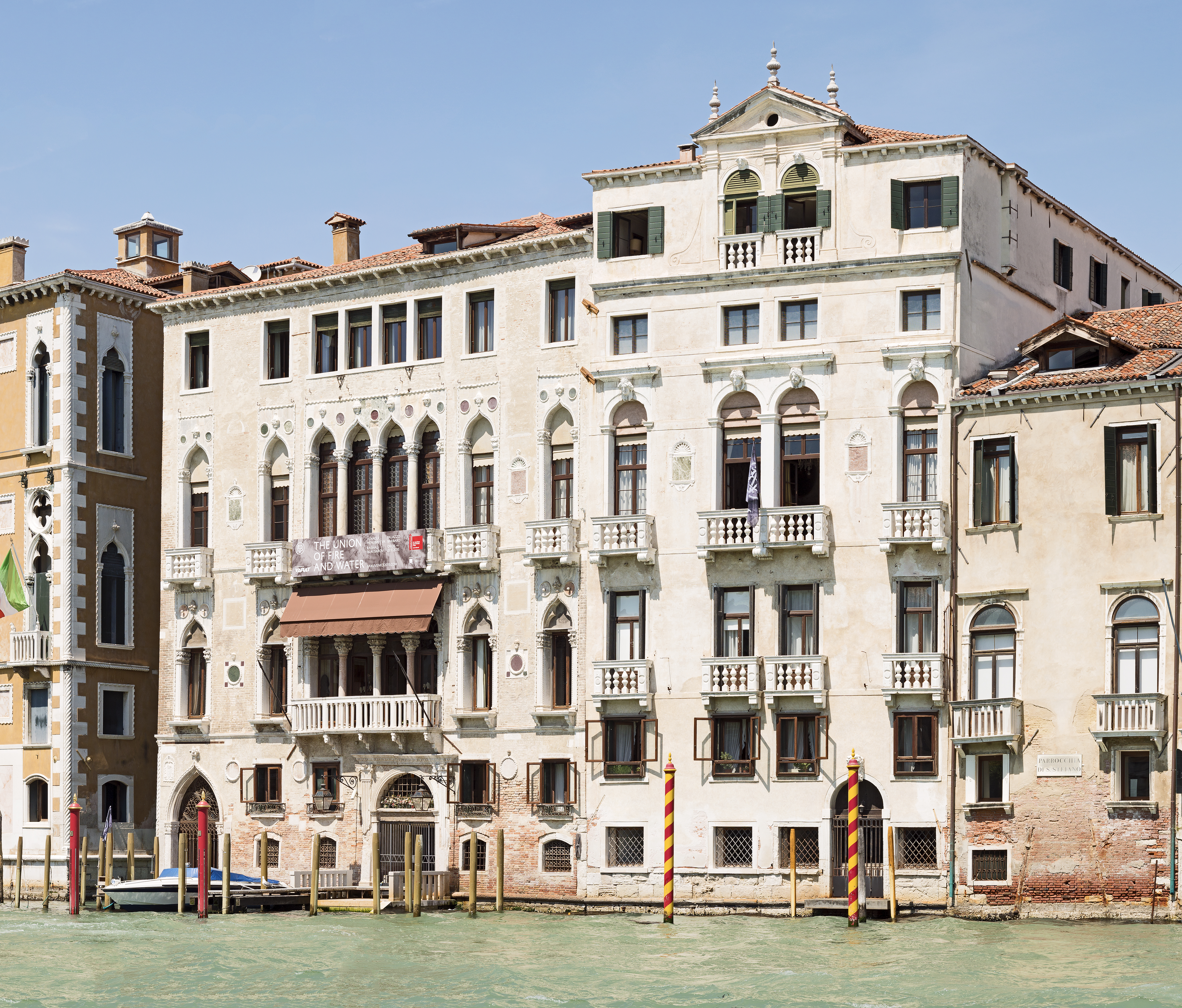
The Palazzo Barbaro a San Vidal

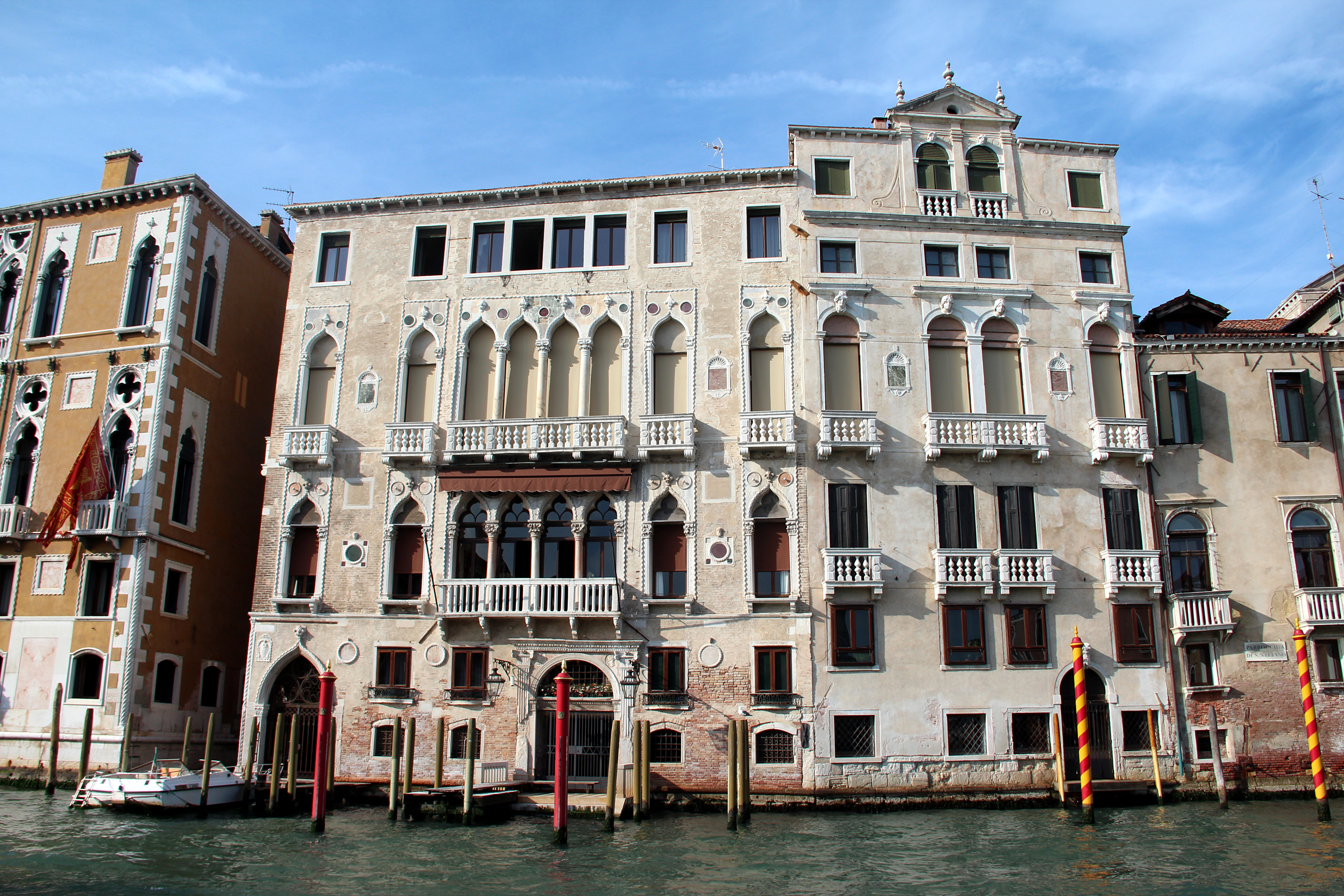
South facade of the palace located on the side of the Canal Grande.

The Palazzi Barbaro—also known as Palazzo Barbaro, Ca' Barbaro, and Palazzo Barbaro-Curtis—are a pair of adjoining palaces, in the San Marco district of Venice, northern Italy. They were formerly one of the homes of the patrician Barbaro family. The Palazzi are located on the Grand Canal of Venice, next to the Palazzo Cavalli-Franchetti and not far from the Ponte dell'Accademia. The buildings are also known as the Palazzo Barbaro-Curtis. It is one of the least altered of the Gothic palaces of Venice.

== History ==
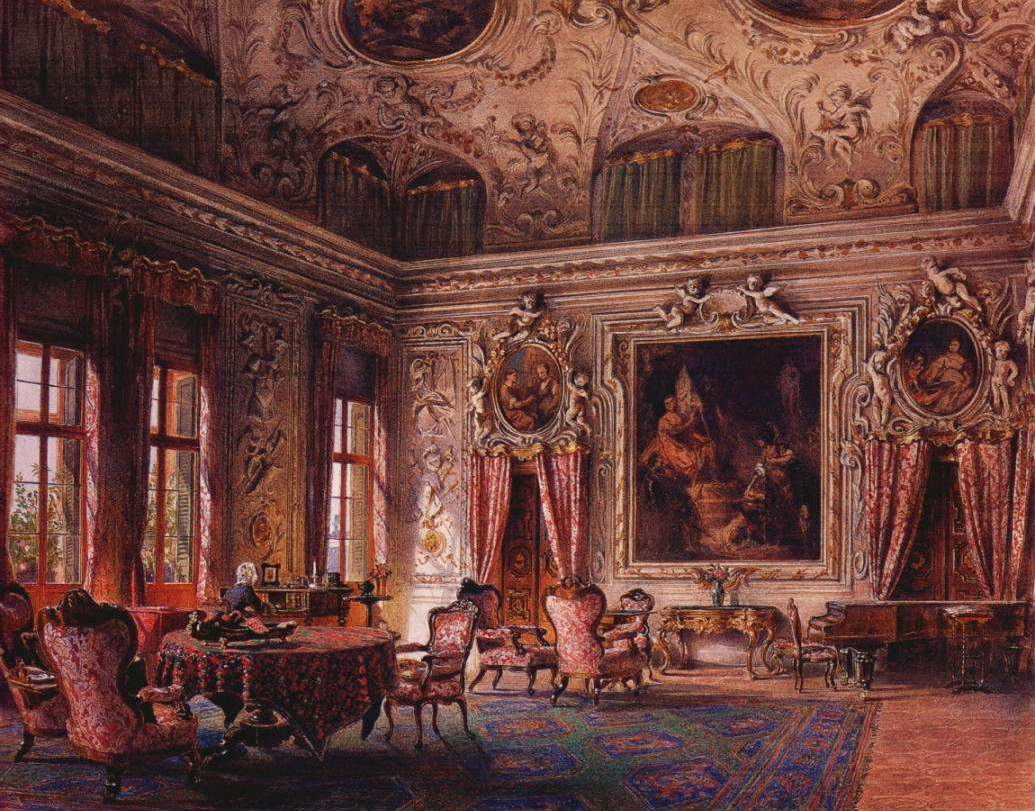
Ludwig Passini, watercolour c. 1855, The Salone of the Palazzo Barbaro

The first of the two palaces is in the Venetian Gothic style and was built in 1425 by Giovanni Bon, one of Venice's master stonemasons. It belonged to Piero Spiera in the early 15th century, passing through several hands before being acquired by Zaccaria Barbaro, Procurator of St Mark's in 1465.

The second structure was executed in the Baroque style and was designed in 1694 by Antonio Gaspari, one of the finest architects of the 17th century. This building was originally two stories and belonged to the Tagliapietra family. In the 16th century, they gave the Barbaro family permission to build on top.

Antonio Gaspari made enlargements to the building from 1694 to 1698. Gaspari's building housed the Barbaro family's ballroom which included a magnificent interior of Baroque stucco-work, paintings of ancient Roman subject matter, such as Sebastiano Ricci's Rape of the Sabine Women and works by Giovanni Battista Piazzetta.

In the 18th century an elegant library was created on the 3rd floor of the palace with a ceiling that incorporated a rich stucco design. In the center of the library's ceiling was placed one of Giovanni Battista Tiepolo's masterpieces The Glorification of the Barbaro Family, a painting that now resides in the Metropolitan Museum of Art in New York. Tiepolo's frescoes have all been removed.

While the Palazzo remained the Barbaro family’s property, they did not always live there. In 1499 it served as the French Embassy to the Republic of Venice. In 1524, Isabella d’Este, widow of Francesco II Gonzaga, Marquess of Mantua and the sister of Alfonso I d'Este was living at the Palazzo Barbaro.

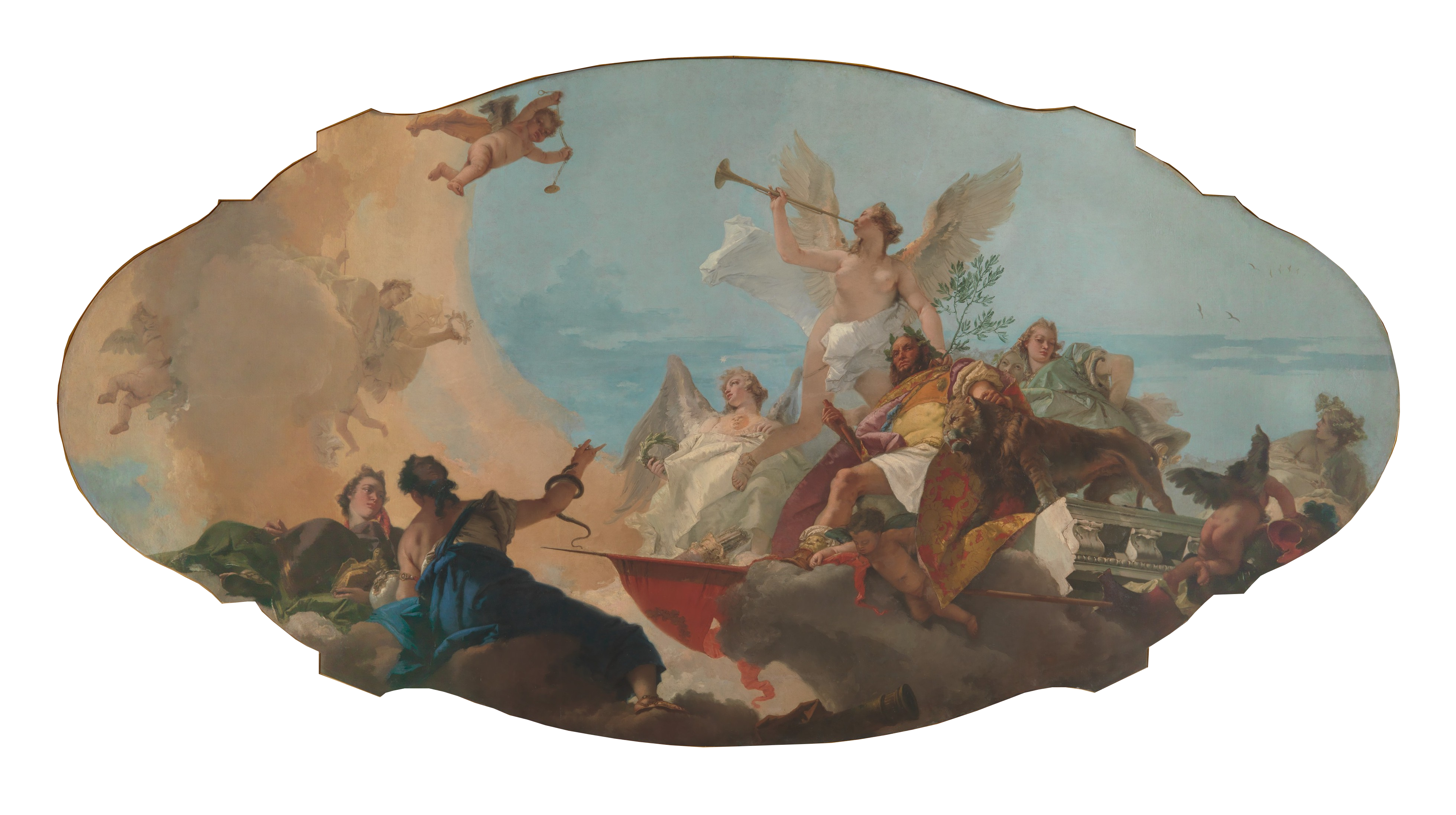
"The Glorification of the Barbaro Family" Ceiling painting originally in the Palazzo Barbaro painted by Giovanni Battista Tiepolo, Metropolitan Museum of Art, New York

In 1797 the Palazzi belonged to Senator Zuanne Barbaro. After the Barbaro family died out in the middle of the 19th century, the Palazzo was bought by a series of speculators who auctioned off furniture and paintings.

In 1881 the older palazzo was rented by a relative of the American painter John Singer Sargent, Daniel Sargent Curtis, who purchased it in 1885.

Daniel and Ariana Curtis repaired and restored the Palazzo Barbaro, and it became a center of American artistic life in Venice with visits from Sargent, their son Ralph Wormeley Curtis, Henry James, Whistler, Robert Browning and Claude Monet. Other members of the "Barbaro Circle" included Bernard Berenson, William Merritt Chase, Isabella Stewart Gardner, Edith Wharton, and Charles Eliot Norton.

Henry James finished The Aspern Papers at a desk that is still housed in the palace today. James considered the Barbaro ballroom the finest example of a Venetian Baroque interior, and included a description in his novel The Wings of the Dove. While James was staying here in 1894 he witnessed his close friend Constance Fenimore Woolson's death when she either jumped or fell from the fourth floor of the Palazzo Orio Semitecolo Benzon, on the other side of the Grand Canal.

In 1898, John Singer Sargent painted a group portrait of the Curtis family in the salon, titled An Interior in Venice. Isabella Stewart Gardner had her portrait painted at the Barbaro by Anders Zorn in 1894.

In 1908 society English hostess and patron of the arts Mary Hunter (1857-1933), rented the palazzo for the season. During the last two weeks of her stay in the autumn of that year Hunter’s friend Alice and her husband Claude Monet stayed with her, with at the end of the rental, the couple relocating to the Hotel Britannia. The Monet's eventual three-month stay in Venice resulted in him painting 37 works, most a series of artworks on the same motif at different times of the day. including the Le Grand Canal and five more depicting the same theme, as well as The Doge's Palace Seen from San Giorgio Maggiore, and San Giorgio Maggiore at Dusk.

Palazzo Barbaro was used as a location in the 1981 television series Brideshead Revisited as the home of Lord Marchmain and his mistress, and also used as a location in the 1997 film adaptation of The Wings of the Dove.

The Palazzo has recently undergone a full aesthetic and structural exterior restoration.

== See also ==
- Barbaro family
- Isabella Stewart Gardner Museum, Boston, MA, US, inspired by the Palazzo Barbaro
