= Wormley =

Wormley may refer to:

== Places ==
- Wormley, Hertfordshire, a village in the Borough of Broxbourne, Hertfordshire, England
- Wormley, Surrey, a village in Surrey, England
- Sykehouse#Wormley_Hill, a hamlet in the Metropolitan Borough of Doncaster, South Yorkshire, England

== People ==
- James Wormley (1819–1884), owner and operator of the Wormley Hotel, Washington D.C.
- Edward Wormley (1907–1970), American furniture designer
- Paul Wormley (born 1961), English footballer
- Sal Wormley (born 2001), American football player
- James Wormley Jones (1884–1958), American FBI special agent
