= Elizabeth Wormeley Latimer =

English-American writer, translator (1822–1904)

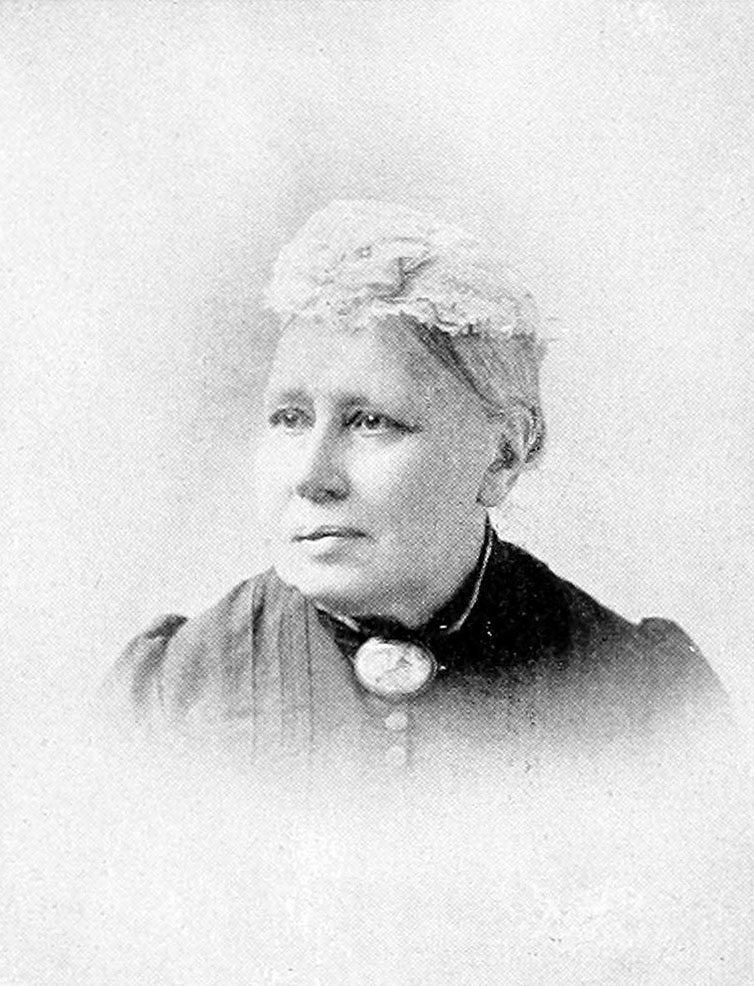
- "A Woman of the Century"
- Born: Mary Elizabeth Wormeley; July 26, 1822; London, England
- Died: January 4, 1904 (aged 81); Baltimore, Maryland, U.S.
- Spouse: Randolph Brandt Latimer
- Children: Caroline Wormeley Latimer; Ralph Randolph Latimer; James Brandt Latimer
- Parent(s): Ralph Randolph Wormeley; Caroline Preble
- Relatives: Katharine P. Wormeley (sister); Daniel S. Curtis (brother-in-law)

Mary Elizabeth Latimer (née Wormeley; July 26, 1822 – January 4, 1904) was an English-American writer, both of original works and translations.

== Early life ==
Mary Elizabeth Wormeley was born on July 26, 1822, in London, the daughter of Admiral Ralph Randolph Wormeley (1785–1852) and Caroline (née Preble) Wormeley (1799–1872). Her father, a native of Virginia, was an Admiral of the British navy, and preceding his death, resided in Boston, Massachusetts. Among her siblings was Ariana Randolph Wormeley, who married the American lawyer and banker Daniel Sargent Curtis, and the nurse and author Katherine Prescott Wormeley.

Her paternal grandfather was James Wormeley, great-grandfather was John Randolph, attorney general for the Colony of Virginia and her grand-uncle was Edmund Randolph, the first Attorney General of the United States. Her mother was a niece of Commodore Edward Preble, U.S. Navy.

Her sisters were Katharine Prescott Wormeley, the translator, and Ariana Randolph Wormeley Curtis (1834–1922), a writer who published the comedy entitled The Coming Woman, or the Spirit of '76 in 1870, which has been acted in public and private both in the United States and in Europe. Ariana was married to prominent banker and patron of the arts, Daniel Sargent Curtis (1825–1908).

== Education and career ==
She was educated by tutors and at a school in Ipswich, Massachusetts. Early travels also helped educate her. She spent the winter of 1842 in Boston as the guest of the family of George Ticknor, and in that environment received much encouragement of her interest in literature.

The daughter resided several years in Newport, Rhode Island, and in 1856, after gaining a reputation as a writer. After spending several years raising her children, she began writing again in 1876.

== Personal life ==
Around 1856, she married Randolph Brandt Latimer (1821–1903) of Baltimore. From 1856 to 1876, she devoted herself to raising a family, including:

- Caroline Wormeley Latimer (1859–1933), a doctor in Boston.
- Ralph Randolph Latimer (1862–1931)
- James Brandt Latimer (1865–1926), who worked for the Baltimore and Ohio Railroad and the Chicago, Burlington and Quincy Railroad and who married Anne Wise Mayo (1879–1955)

Latimer died on January 4, 1904, aged 81, in Baltimore, Maryland.

== Works ==
She contributed to magazines, and published:

- Forest Hill: a Tale of Social Life in 1830-1 (3 vols., London, 1846)
- Amabel, a Family History, a novel (New York, 1853)
- Our Cousin Veronica (1856)
- Familiar Talks on Some of Shakespeare's Comedies (Boston, 1887)

A number of her works were volumes dealing popularly with contemporary European history:

- France in the Nineteenth Century (1892) Further books followed this one on Russia, Turkey, England, Europeans in Africa and Spain.
- Italy in the Nineteenth Century and the Making of Austro-Hungary and Germany (1896)
- My Scrap Book of the French Revolution (1898)
- Judea from Cyrus to Titus; 537 B.C. - 70 A.D. (1899)
- The Last Years of the Nineteenth Century (1900)

She translated:

- Louis Ulbach, Madame Gosselin (New York, 1878)
- Louis Ulbach, The Steel Hammer (originally Le Marteau d'acier; 1888)
- Louis Ulbach, For Fifteen Years, a sequel to The Steel Hammer (originally Quinze ans de bagne; 1888)
- Ernest Renan, A History of the People of Israel (with J. H. Allen; 1888–96)
- George Sand, Nanon (1890)
- J. C. L. de Sismondi, The Italian Republics (1901)
- The Love Letters of Victor Hugo, 1820-22 (1901)
- Talks of Napoleon at St. Helena with General Baron Gourgaud (1903)
