= Katherine Prescott Wormeley =

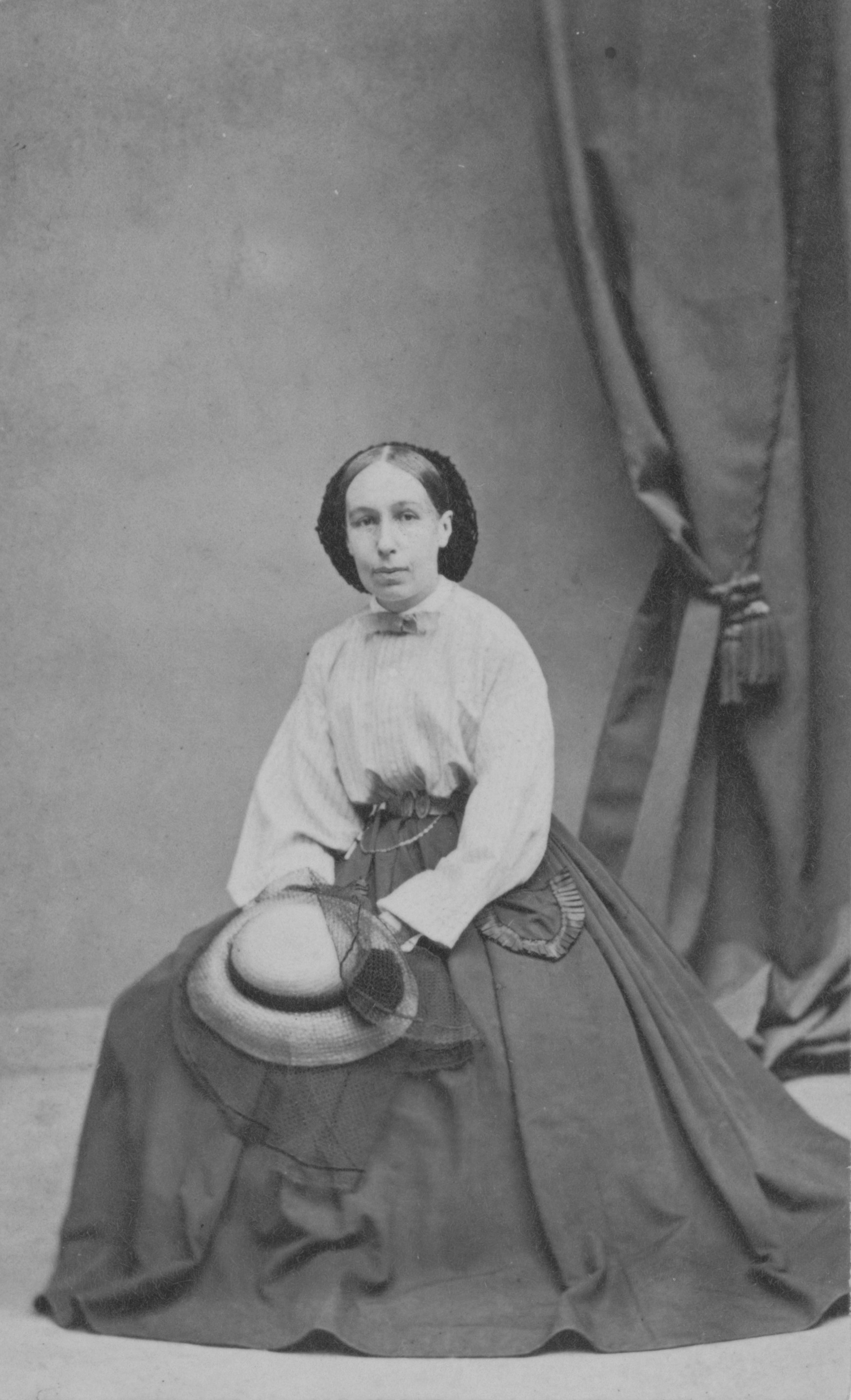
- Katherine Prescott Wormeley, c. 1861–1865
- Born: January 14, 1830; Ipswich, England
- Died: August 4, 1908 (aged 78); Jackson, New Hampshire, United States
- Occupations: Nurse, translator

Katherine Prescott Wormeley (January 14, 1830 – August 4, 1908) was a nurse in the American Civil War, author, editor, and translator of French language literary works. Her first name is frequently misspelled as "Katharine".

== Biography ==
Born to Admiral Ralph Randolph Wormeley and Caroline Preble in Ipswich, Suffolk, England, the daughter of a naval officer, Katherine Prescott Wormeley emigrated to the United States at a young age.

During the American Civil War, she played a role in the work of the United States Sanitary Commission, a civilian agency set up to coordinate the volunteer efforts of women and men who wanted to contribute to the war effort, with noted landscape designer Frederick Law Olmsted and the Rev. Henry Bellows. The Commission was a volunteer affiliate of the Union Army. She served as a nurse with the Commission and was later head nurse at the Army Hospital at Portsmouth Grove near Newport, Rhode Island. She lived in Newport, in a cottage designed by Charles Follen McKim, that was next door to John La Farge's house.

Katherine Prescott Wormeley died on August 4, 1908, at her summer home in Jackson, New Hampshire. She is buried in the Island Cemetery in Newport, Rhode Island.

== Works ==
Wormeley was one of the best known translators of her time, having translated from the French language the complete works of Honoré de Balzac (40 vols., 1883–97) for American readers. She also translated the Narrative of Marie-Thérèse Charlotte de France, the memoirs of Madame de Motteville on Anne of Austria, as well as works by Molière (6 vols., 1892), Louis de Rouvroy, duc de Saint-Simon, Alphonse Daudet, and Alexandre Dumas, among others. In 1904 she published a 2-volume selection of essays translated from Charles Augustin Sainte-Beuve's Causeries du Lundi, Portraits de Femmes, and Portraits Littéraires.

She also published The U. S. Sanitary Commission (Boston, 1863). A volume of her letters from the headquarters of the Commission with the Army of the Potomac during the peninsular campaign in 1862 was published as Letters from Headquarters during the Peninsular Campaign. The Other Side of War was published in 1888, and Life of Balzac in 1892.

== Family ==
Her sisters Elizabeth Wormeley Latimer and Ariana Randolph (Wormeley) Curtis (b. 1835) were also writers.

== See also ==
- Dorothea Dix
- Clara Barton

== Sources ==
- George M. Fredrickson (1965/1993), The Inner Civil War: Northern Intellectuals and the Crisis of the Union, reprint with new preface, Urbana, IL: University of Illinois Press.
- Selected list of works by Katherine Prescott Wormeley at Barnes and Noble
- April 16, 1898 New York Times article titled "War and Navies - Miss Wormeley's Volume on the Cruel Side of War"
- August 6, 1908 New York Times obituary for Katherine Prescott Wormeley
