= Charles Barney Harding =

American businessman (1899–1979)

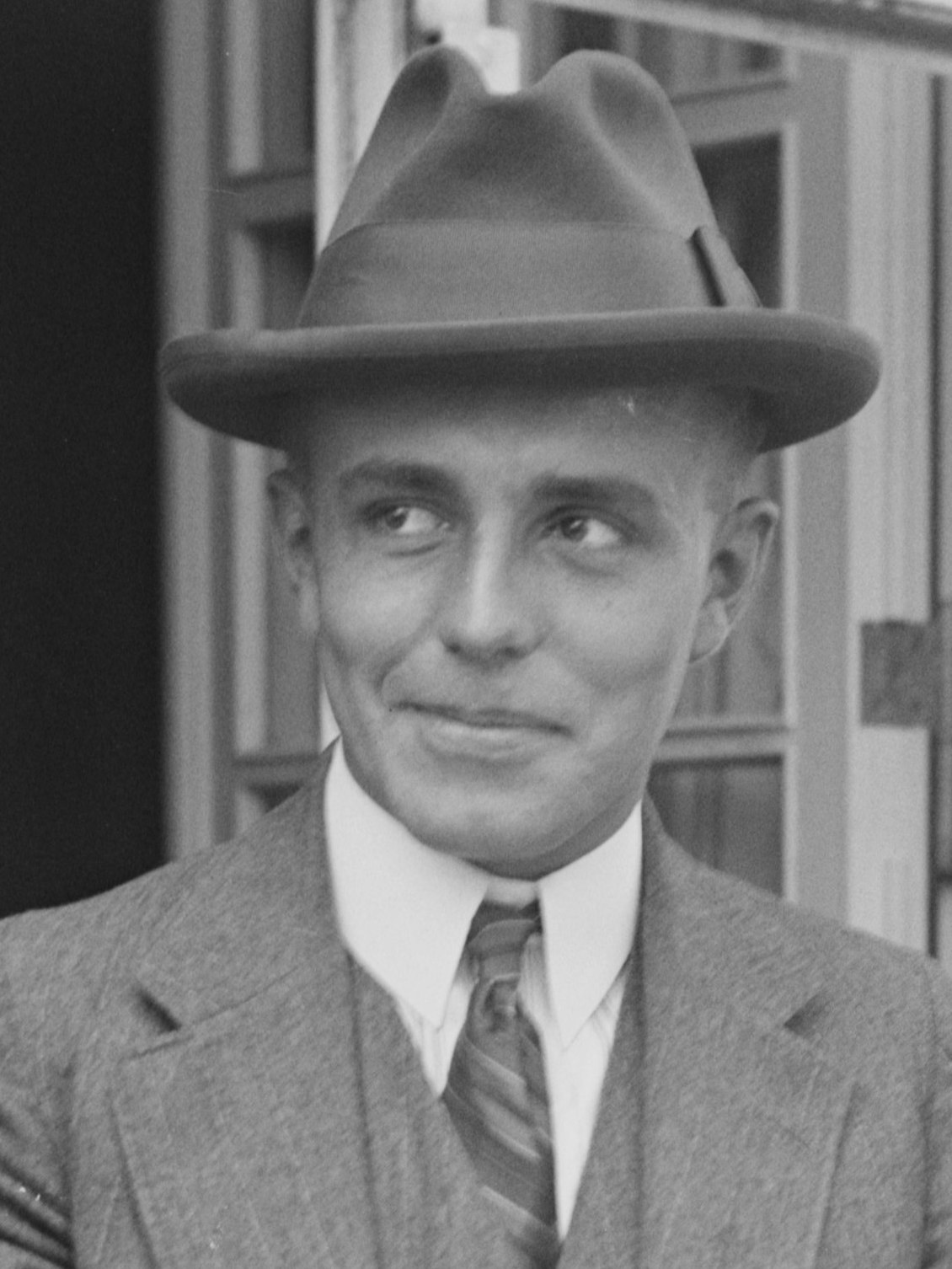
- Harding in 1922
- Born: September 11, 1899; Chestnut Hill, Pennsylvania, U.S.
- Died: October 25, 1979 (aged 80); Rumson, New Jersey, U.S.
- Education: Groton School
- Alma mater: United States Military Academy
- Occupation: Financier
- Spouse: Marion Choate (1926–1979)
- Children: 2
- Parent(s): J. Horace Harding; Dorothea Barney Harding
- Relatives: Charles D. Barney (grandfather); Laura Barney Harding (sister); William Barclay Harding (brother)

Charles Barney Harding (September 11, 1899 – October 25, 1979) was an American financier who served as chairman of the New York Stock Exchange, Smith, Barney & Co., and the New York Botanical Gardens.

== Early life ==
Harding was born in Chestnut Hill, Pennsylvania on September 11, 1899 and grew up in a townhouse on Fifth Avenue. He was the eldest of four children born to James Horace Harding (1863–1929) and Dorothea Elizabeth Allen (née Barney) Harding (1871–1935). His siblings were Catherine (née Harding) Tailer (wife of polo player Lorillard Suffern Tailer), socialite and philanthropist Laura Barney Harding (who was a close friend of Katharine Hepburn), and banker William Barclay Harding. His father was a banker and financier who served as a director of the New York, New Haven and Hartford Railroad and the New York Municipal Railways System.

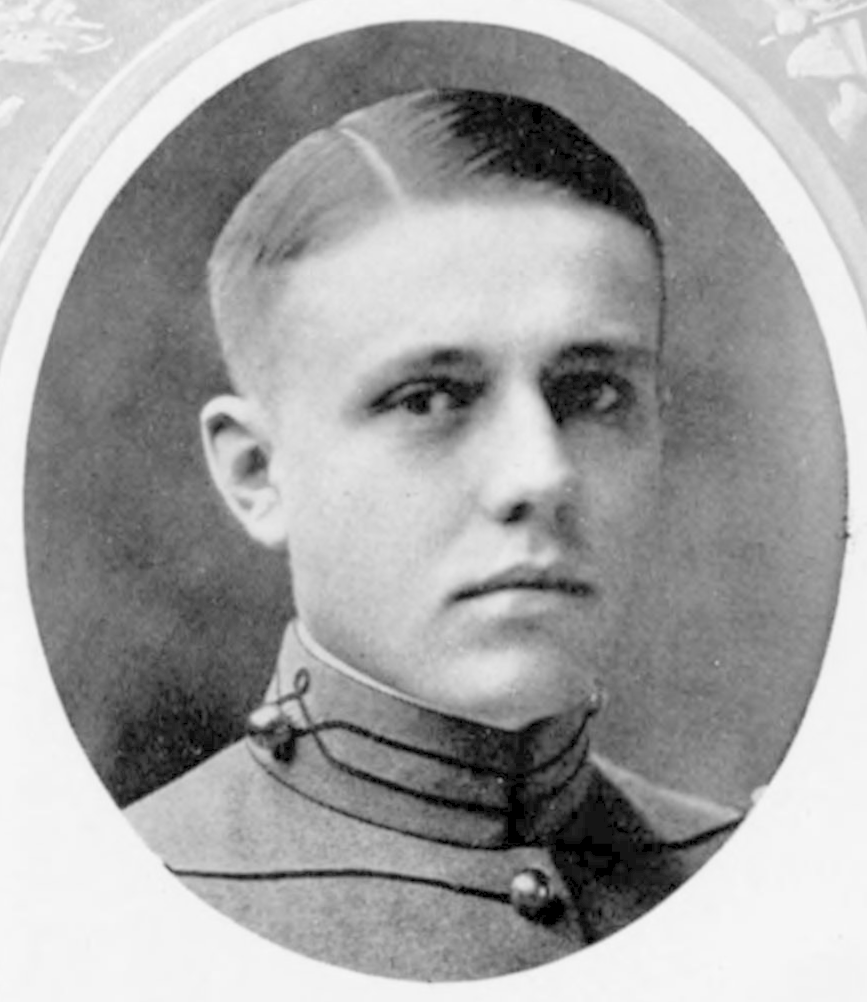
At West Point in 1920

His maternal grandparents were Charles D. Barney and Laura (née Cooke) Barney (a daughter of Philadelphia financier Jay Cooke). His grandfather, a former member of his great-grandfather's firm, Jay Cooke & Company, founded Charles D. Barney & Co. in 1873 before retiring in 1907. The business continued, under the same name with his father helping to run the firm.

Harding prepared at the Groton School in Massachusetts before attending the United States Military Academy at West Point, from where he graduated in 1920. After graduation, he served two years as a lieutenant in the field artillery. Years later, Harding joined the U.S. Navy Reserve shortly before the U.S. entered World War II. He went on active duty in May 1941, and was discharged four years later as a captain.

== Career ==
In 1922, he joined the family business, Charles D. Barney & Co. and was made a partner in 1925. In 1937, the firm merged with Edward B. Smith & Co. to form Smith, Barney & Co. which began operations January 1, 1938. At his direction, the firm "recruited business school graduates, then put them through eight-and-a-half months of training in what was sometimes referred to on The Street as 'Harding Tech.'" After 4 1/2 years in the Naval Reserve, he returned as senior partner in January 1946. In May 1964, he surrendered the office of president to Nelson Schaenen while remaining chief executive officer. On December 31, 1964, Harding retired as chairman of Smith, Barney & Co. in favor of his brother, who had been vice chairman.

In the late 1930's, he served as a governor of the New York Stock Exchange, and helped revise the Exchange's constitution before serving as chairman of the Exchange from May 1940 to May 1941; he did not run for reelection because of his impending Naval service.

After his retirement from Smith, Barney & Co., he devoted his time to the New York Botanical Gardens, the Arthritis Foundation, serving as chairman from 1970 to 1976, and the Frick Collection, where he was treasurer for many years. He later relinquished his chairmanships with the botanical gardens and the Arthritis Foundation, but continued working with them and the Frick Collection until his death.

== Personal life ==
In 1926, married Marion Choate (1905–1979), a daughter of lawyer Joseph H. Choate Jr. and Cora Lyman (née Oliver) Choate (a daughter of Gen. Robert Shaw Oliver). Her paternal grandparents were U.S. Ambassador Joseph Hodges Choate and Caroline Dutcher Sterling Choate Marion had her debut in 1925. Together, they lived at 110 East 71st Street, and, later, 48 East 74th Street, and were the parents of two children, a daughter a son:

- Joan Harding (1927- 2011), who married Thomas James King (1925–1994), a son of Thomas J. King, Sr., in 1950.
- Robert Shaw Oliver Harding (b. 1931), who married Nancy Joyce Dickey, daughter of Col. Joseph Kingsley Dickey, in 1958; they divorced and he married Diana Pike, a daughter of Carleton M. Pike and granddaughter of Mayor Edwin Upton Curtis, in 1966.

The Hardings regularly spent their winters in Barbados and their summers in Martha's Vineyard, where they had a home. He was "an ardent sailor" who was an "enthusiastic trout fisherman" along the coasts of New Jersey and Cape Cod.

Harding died at his home in Rumson, New Jersey on October 26, 1979.
