= William Barclay Harding =

American businessman (1906–1967)

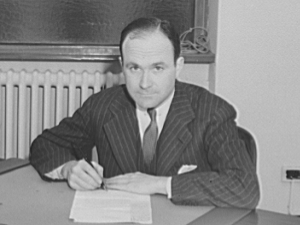
- Born: November 16, 1906; New York City, New York, U.S.
- Died: June 30, 1967 (aged 60); Long Branch, New Jersey, U.S.
- Education: Groton School
- Alma mater: Yale University
- Occupation: Financier
- Spouses: Constance Fox (m. 1929; div. 1943) Mary Reed Dodge (m. 1943)
- Children: 3
- Parent(s): J. Horace Harding; Dorothea Barney Harding
- Relatives: Charles D. Barney (grandfather); Laura Barney Harding (sister)

William Barclay Harding (November 16, 1906 – June 30, 1967) was an American financier who served as chairman of the board of Smith, Barney and Co. until his death in 1967.

== Early life ==
Harding was born in New York City on November 16, 1906, and grew up in a townhouse on Fifth Avenue. He was the second son of four children born to James Horace Harding (1863–1929) and Dorothea Elizabeth Allen (née Barney) Harding (1871–1935). His siblings were banker Charles Barney Harding (who married Marion Choate, a daughter of Joseph H. Choate Jr.), Catherine (née Harding) Tailer (wife of polo player Lorillard Suffern Tailer), and the socialite and philanthropist Laura Barney Harding, who was a close friend of actress Katharine Hepburn. His father was a banker and financier who served as a director of the New York, New Haven and Hartford Railroad and the New York Municipal Railways System.

His maternal grandparents were Charles D. Barney and Laura (née Cooke) Barney, a daughter of Philadelphia financier Jay Cooke. His grandfather, a former member of his great-grandfather's firm, Jay Cooke & Company, founded Charles D. Barney & Co. in 1873 before retiring in 1907. The business continued under the same name, with his father helping to run the firm.

Harding prepared at the Groton School in Groton, Massachusetts, before attending Yale University in New Haven, Connecticut. He later became a trustee of Groton.

== Career ==
In 1929, he joined the New York investment firm of Charles D. Barney & Co., which had been established by his grandfather. Upon the 1938 merger of Charles D. Barney & Co. and Edward B. Smith & Co., which created Smith, Barney & Co., he became a partner in the new firm like his brother. As a financier, he "was responsible for reshaping the financial architecture of many corporations, especially in the aviation industry." In 1965, Harding and his older brother switched roles, and he became chairman of the board of Smith, Barney & Co., a role his brother had held since 1944.

He was a founder of the Red Bank Airport and a member of the Monmouth County Airport Advisory Board. In 1955, at the request of President Dwight D. Eisenhower, he headed an Aviation Facilities Studies Group to study air traffic control problems which eventually led to the formation of the Federal Aviation Agency. He also served on the New York City Council on Port Development and Promotion. At the time of his death, he also served a director of Electric Auto Light Co. of Toledo, Ohio.

=== Military service ===
During World War II, he entered the service as a lieutenant in the U.S. Naval Reserve, became a Captain the U.S. Army and was discharged from the Army Air Forces as a Colonel and was decorated with the Legion of Merit.

== Personal life ==
On March 30, 1929, Harding was married Constance Fox (1908–1972), a daughter of Edward Lyttleton Fox and Genevieve Morgan (née O'Brien) Fox (daughter of Judge Morgan J. O'Brien). Before they separated in 1941, they were the parents of two sons and a daughter:

- Dorothea Harding (1930–1997), who married writer and produce Blair Chotzinoff (1926–2005), a nephew of violinist Jascha Heifetz, in 1957. He had previously been engaged to Gloria Steinem. After having two daughters, they divorced and she married William H. Kobin.
- James Horace Harding (b. 1932), an aeronautical engineer who married Anne M. Weill, a daughter of Paul B. Weill, in 1957.
- Timothy Fox Harding (b. 1934), a writer who married Patricia Anne Nye, a daughter of Selden Spencer Nye, in 1956.

After they were divorced on June 28, 1943, in Nevada, Constance remarried George Lavan Weissman (1916–1985) and Harding remarried Mary Newbold (née Reed) Dodge, the daughter of Latham Reed and former wife of Marshall J. Dodge Jr. (grandson of Josephine Jewell Dodge), in August 1943. They lived at 435 East 52nd Street in Manhattan and in a 150-year-old farmhouse in Holmdel Township in New Jersey.

A prominent philanthropist, he served as president of the New Jersey State Home for Boys in Jamesburg and a member of the board of director of the Allenwood Sanatorium.

Harding died on June 30, 1967, at Monmouth Medical Center in Long Branch, New Jersey.
