= Joseph H. Choate Jr. =

American lawyer (1876–1968)

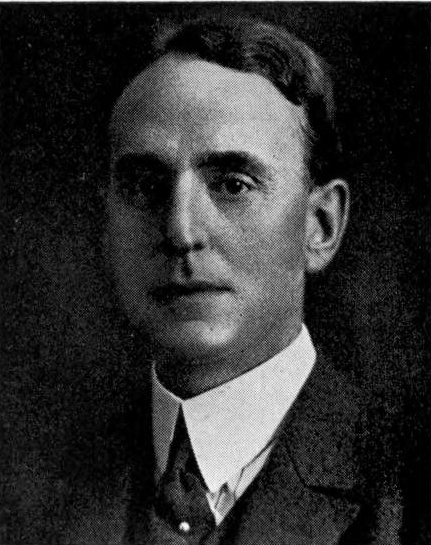
- Choate c. 1922
- Born: Joseph Hodges Choate Jr. February 2, 1876; Manhattan, New York, U.S.
- Died: January 19, 1968 (aged 91); Mount Kisco, New York, U.S.
- Education: Harvard University; Harvard Law School
- Spouse: Cora Lyman Oliver (m. 1903; died 1955)
- Children: 4
- Parents: Joseph Hodges Choate (father); Caroline Dutcher Sterling Choate (mother)
- Relatives: William Gardner Choate (uncle); George Cheyne Shattuck Choate (uncle); Nicholas Platt (grandson)
- Awards: Legion of Honour

Joseph Hodges Choate Jr. (February 2, 1876 – January 19, 1968), was an American lawyer who chaired the Voluntary Committee of Lawyers, a group established in 1927 that promoted the repeal of prohibition. Upon repeal in 1933, President Franklin Roosevelt named Choate the first head of the Federal Alcohol Control Administration (FACA).

== Early life ==
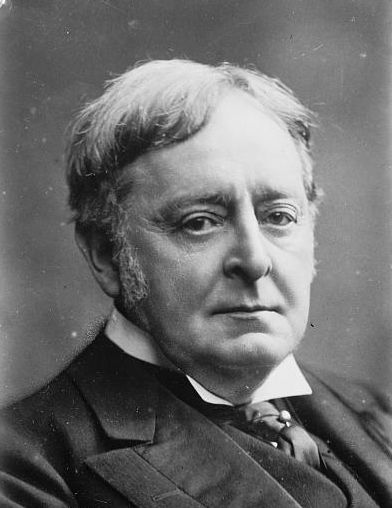
His father, Ambassador Choate

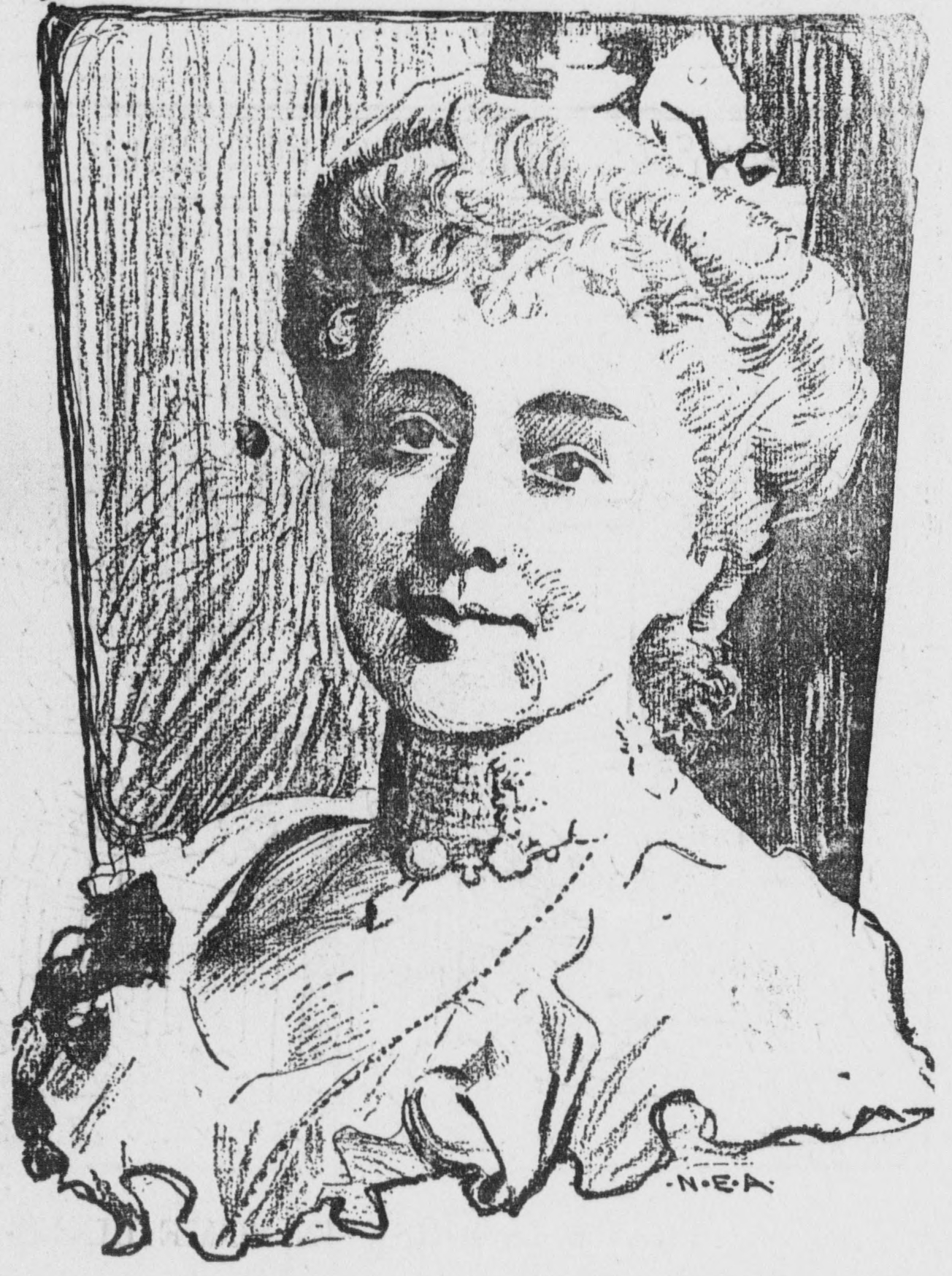
His mother, Caroline Sterling Choate

Joseph Hodges Choate Jr. was born on February 2, 1876, in New York City, where he grew up, as well as at Naumkeag, his family's country estate in Stockbridge, Massachusetts. He was youngest of five children born to U.S. lawyer and diplomat Joseph Hodges Choate and artist and activist Caroline Dutcher Sterling Choate. His older siblings were Ruluff Sterling Choate, George Choate, Josephine Choate, and Mabel Choate. In 1899, his father was appointed ambassador to the Court of St. James in London by President William McKinley and served from 1899 to 1905, continuing under President Theodore Roosevelt.

His paternal grandparents were Margaret Manning (née Hodges) Choate and Dr. George Choate, a physician. Among his extended family were uncles William Gardner Choate, a U.S. district judge of the Southern District of New York (who established Choate School), and Dr. George Cheyne Shattuck Choate. Her maternal grandparents were Caroline (née Dutcher) Sterling and Frederick Augustine Sterling, who were both from Connecticut.

Like his father and uncle William before him, he graduated from Harvard University in 1897 and Harvard Law School.

== Career ==
Upon his father's appointment as ambassador, the younger Choate left law school in Cambridge and joined him in London as third secretary of the Embassy. Choate returned in 1901 to finish his law degree and graduated the following year.

After gaining admission to the bar, Choate practiced law in New York City becoming senior partner in the firm of Choate, Byrd, Léon & Garretson (which was named Choate, Regan, Davis & Hollister at the time of his death). He chaired the Voluntary Committee of Lawyers, a group established in 1927 that promoted the repeal of prohibition. Upon repeal in 1933, President Franklin Roosevelt named Choate the first head of the Federal Alcohol Control Administration (FACA), where he fought for lower priced liquor as a way to end bootlegging. He served until 1935 when the agency was replaced by the Federal Alcohol Administration, part of the Department of the Treasury. His successor was Franklin Chase Hoyt.

Choate was active in support of the Fusion candidacy of Mayor Fiorello H. LaGuardia and in 1936, he was chairman of the 50th anniversary celebration of the Statue of Liberty. The following year he was made an officer of the French Legion of Honour.

== Personal life ==
In 1903, Choate was married to Cora Lyman Oliver (1876–1955), daughter of General and Assistant Secretary of War Robert Shaw Oliver and Marion Lucy (née Rathbone) Oliver. Cora's older brother was noted psychiatrist and medical historian John Rathbone Oliver. They had homes in Mount Kisco, New York, in New York City at 950 Fifth Avenue, and in North Haven, Maine. They were the parents of four children, including:

- Marion Choate (1905–1979), who married Charles Barney Harding, who served as chairman of the New York Stock Exchange and Smith, Barney & Co. (founded by his grandfather Charles D. Barney). A son of banker J. Horace Harding, he was a brother of Laura Barney Harding and a great-grandson of financier Jay Cooke.
- Helen Choate (1906–1974), who married architect Geoffrey Platt in 1932.
- Priscilla Choate (1908–1998), who married Norwood P. Hallowell III, a son of N. Penrose Hallowell and grandson of Col. Norwood Penrose Hallowell in 1933.
- Joseph Hodges Choate III (1913–1973), who became a lawyer and married Sarah "Sarita" Blagden.

He died at his home in Mount Kisco on January 19, 1968. After a funeral at St. Mark's Episcopal Church in Mt. Kisco, he was buried with his family at Stockbridge Cemetery in Stockbridge, Massachusetts.

=== Descendants ===
Through his daughter Helen, he was a grandfather of diplomat Nicholas Platt (b. 1936), the former U.S. Ambassador to Zambia, the Philippines, and Pakistan; and the great-grandfather of actor Oliver Platt (b. 1960).
