= J. Horace Harding =

American banker, financier and art collector

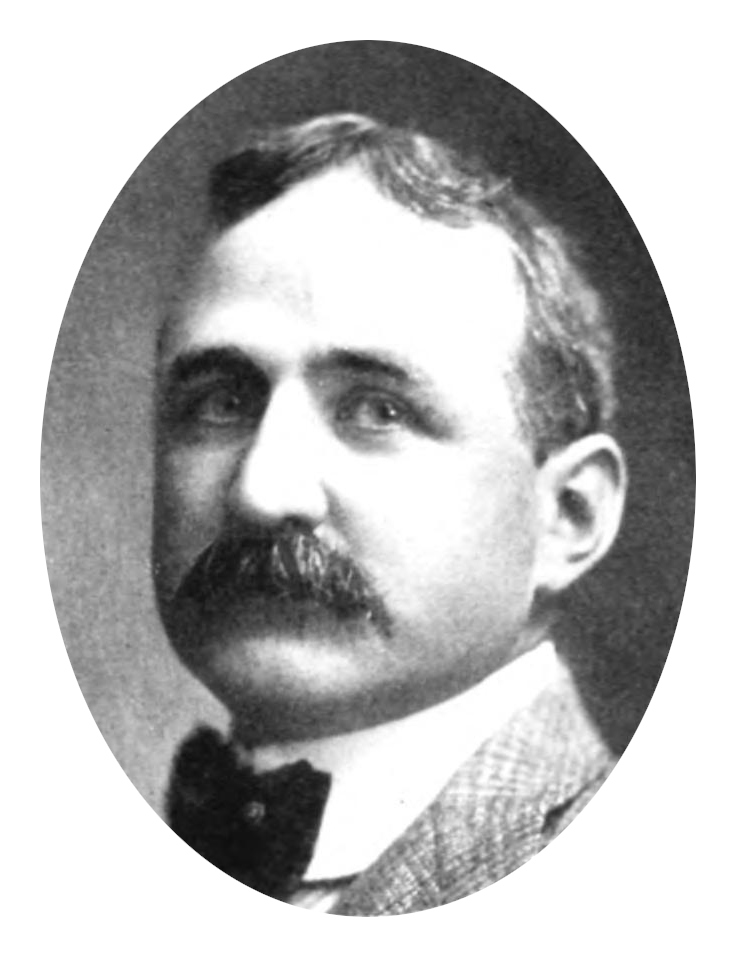
- Born: James Horace Harding; July 13, 1863; Philadelphia, Pennsylvania, U.S.
- Died: January 4, 1929 (aged 65); New York City, New York, U.S.
- Occupation: Financier
- Spouse: Dorothea Elizabeth Allen Barney (m. 1898)
- Children: Charles Barney Harding; Catherine Harding Tailer; Laura Barney Harding; William Barclay Harding
- Parent(s): William White Harding; Catherine Badger Hart
- Relatives: Jesper Harding (grandfather)

James Horace Harding (July 13, 1863 – January 4, 1929) was an American banker, financier and art collector.

== Early life ==
Harding was born on July 13, 1863, in Philadelphia, Pennsylvania. He was a son of publisher William White Harding and Catherine Badger (née Hart) Harding. Among his siblings was sister Jessie Harding (wife of Alfred Hennen Morris), and brothers Edward Harding and William G. Harding, who Horace provided support for in his will.

His paternal grandparents were Maria (née Wilson) Harding and Jesper Harding, who had owned The Pennsylvania Inquirer and National Gazette. After his grandfather retired from publishing in 1859, his father became publisher and changed the paper's name to The Philadelphia Inquirer. His uncle, George Harding, became a patent lawyer and argued several cases before the U.S. Supreme Court. His maternal grandparents were James Hankinson Hart and Catherine Louise (née Badger) Hart.

== Career ==
Harding entered the banking field when he was twenty years old. After his 1898 marriage, he entered the New York banking investment firm of Charles D. Barney & Co. The firm was founded by Barney in 1873 after his father-in-law's firm, Jay Cooke & Company went under during the Panic of 1873. Upon Barney's retirement in 1907, Harding ran the business under the same name, as senior partner, with Henry E. Butler, Jay Cooke III (his wife's cousin who was the former Republican National Committeeman), and Charles S. Phillips. In 1919, he stepped down as senior partner and became a special partner. In 1938, Charles D. Barney & Co. and Edward B. Smith & Co. merged to form Smith, Barney & Co.

In November 1923, he succeeded Burns D. Caldwell (former president of Wells Fargo & Company) as chairman of the board of the American Express Company, having been closely associated with George C. Taylor during the founding of the company and being a member of the board of the executive committee ever since. Harding also served as a director of the American Exchange Irving Trust Company, the American Gas and Electric Company, the Cerro de Pasco Copper Company, the Continental Can Company, the Public Service Corporation of New Jersey, the Southern Pacific Company, the United States Industrial Alcohol Company, the Ann Arbor Railroad, the New York, New Haven and Hartford Railroad, the New York, Ontario and Western Railway, the Wabash Railway, the New York Municipal Railways System, and was a trustee of the American Surety Company.

== Personal life ==
In 1898, Harding was married to Dorothea Elizabeth Allen Barney (1871–1935). She was a daughter of Charles D. Barney and Laura (née Cooke) Barney, a daughter of Philadelphia financier Jay Cooke. They were the parents of four children:

- Charles Barney Harding (1899–1979), who married Marion Choate, a daughter of Joseph H. Choate Jr.
- Catherine Harding (1900–1990), who married polo player Lorillard Suffern Tailer, a son of Thomas Suffern Tailer (a son of Edward Neufville Tailer) and Maude (née Lorillard) Baring, Baroness Revelstoke (a daughter of Pierre Lorillard IV), in 1921. His younger half-brother was Rupert Baring, 4th Baron Revelstoke. From 1932 until her death, she was the partner of Irish writer Liam O'Flaherty.
- Laura Barney Harding (1902–1994), a socialite and philanthropist who was a close friend of actress Katharine Hepburn.
- William Barclay Harding (1907–1967), who married Constance Fox, a granddaughter of Judge Morgan J. O'Brien, in 1929. They divorced in 1943 and he remarried to Mary Newbold (née Reed) Dodge.

Harding died of influenza on January 4, 1929, at 955 Fifth Avenue, his townhouse in Manhattan (later replaced by a Rosario Candela designed apartment building). After a funeral at St. Bartholomew's Church on Park Avenue, he was buried at Saint Paul's Episcopal Churchyard in Elkins Park, Pennsylvania. He left his fortune to his family. His widow died in 1935.

=== Art collection ===
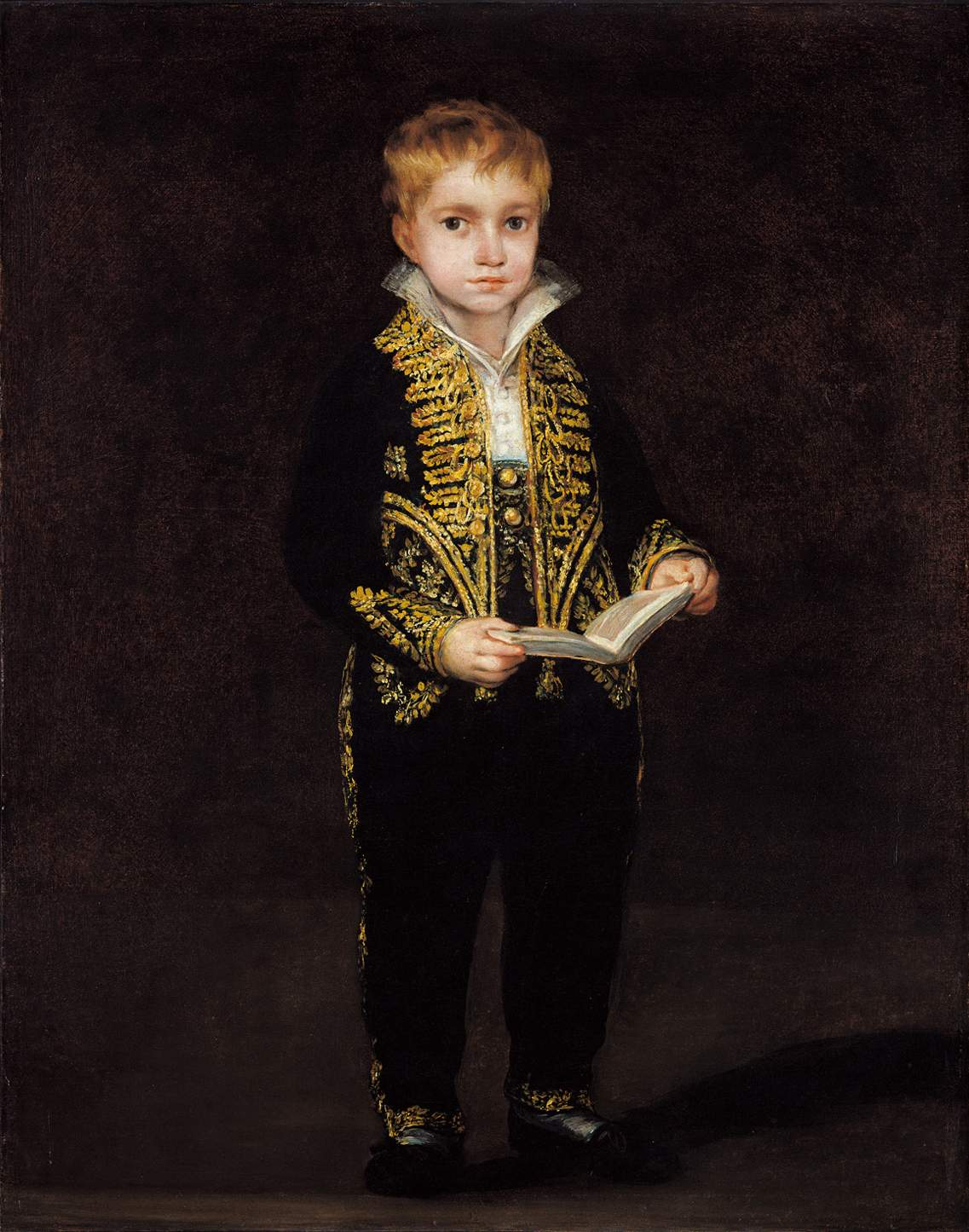
Portrait of Victor Guye by Francisco de Goya, 1810.

Harding "was long interested in art and devoted considerable of his time to the work of the Frick collection," and served as a trustee of the art that was bequeathed to New York City by his friend, Henry Clay Frick. In 1912, the Hardings returned to New York from Liverpool aboard the Mauretania after touring Egypt with Frick. Frick, who was supposed to sail with them, relinquished his berth at the last moment and decided to stay in London where he purchased two Paolo Veronese canvases, Allegory of Virtue and Vice and Allegory of Wisdom and Strength, for which Frick paid Knoedler & Co $200,000.

They owned the Portrait of Mrs. Freeman Jr. by Sir Joshua Reynolds, Portrait of Margaretta Henrietta, Lady Hepburn (wife of Sir George Buchan-Hepburn) by Sir Henry Raeburn, St. Paul by Doménikos Theotokópoulos (known as El Greco), and Miss Julia Mott by Thomas Gainsborough In 1916, Harding purchased the 1810 portrait of Victor Guye by Francisco de Goya. In 1941, this painting, and others from his collection were sold in 1941 by his children via Parke-Bernet. The Goya portrait was bought by William Nelson Cromwell for the National Gallery of Art.

In 1927, he commissioned Oswald Birley to make a portrait of President Plutarco Elías Calles of Mexico, which he presented to the Mexican government.

=== Legacy ===
Harding supported the development of Long Island's roadways and was a proponent of Robert Moses' parkway plan. He personally commissioned engineering studies to promote the construction of a highway from Queens Boulevard to Nassau County, in order to provide better access to Oakland Country Club, where he was a member and avid golfer. The road was built during Mayor Jimmy Walker's administration and was opened in 1928 as Nassau Boulevard.

In 1917, he paid $100,000 for the construction of Harding Road, to connect Broad Street in Red Bank with Ridge Road in Rumson, in Monmouth County, New Jersey. He was also a member of the board of governors of the Long Branch Hospital since 1914.

In May 1929, four months after Harding's death, the road was named Horace Harding Boulevard in his honor. In 1939, the New York City Council proposed renaming Horace Harding Boulevard to Worlds Fair Boulevard due to the New York World's Fair, but Mayor Fiorello La Guardia refused to remove the name of his friend. Today, it is the section between Queens Boulevard and the Queens-Nassau county line of the Long Island Expressway and is known as New York State Route 25D.

He was also the namesake of the Horace Harding Hospital in Elmhurst, Queens (later renamed St. John's Hospital before it closed in March 2009) and Horace Harding Playground, located in the Queens neighborhood of Rego Park. There is also a bas-relief bust of Harding on a three-sided parcel of land at the intersection of Harding Road and Ridge Road in Little Silver, near Thornton, Harding's summer home in Rumson, New Jersey.
