= Robert Shaw Oliver =

American soldier and businessman (1847–1935)

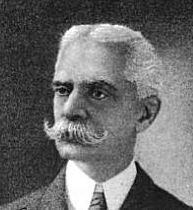

Assistant Secretary of War
- In office 1903–1913
- President: Theodore Roosevelt; William Howard Taft
- Preceded by: William Cary Sanger
- Succeeded by: Henry Skillman Breckinridge

Personal details
- Born: September 13, 1847 Boston, Massachusetts
- Died: March 15, 1935 (aged 87) Charleston, South Carolina
- Resting place: Albany Rural Cemetery, Menands, New York
- Spouse: Marion Lucy Rathbone (m. 1870; died 1926)
- Relations: Quincy Adams Shaw (uncle)
- Children: 4, including John Rathbone Oliver
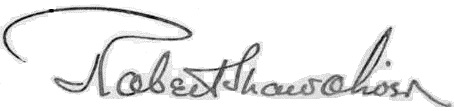
- Signature

Robert Shaw Oliver (September 13, 1847 – March 15, 1935) was an American soldier and businessman.

== Early life ==
Oliver was born in Boston, Massachusetts, on September 13, 1847. He was a son of Daniel Augustus Oliver and Elizabeth Willard (née Shaw) Oliver (1823–1850), who died three years after his birth.

His maternal grandparents were Robert Gould Shaw and Eliza Willard (née Parkman) Shaw. Through his abolitionist uncle Francis George Shaw and, his wife, Sarah Blake Sturgis Shaw, he was a first cousin of Josephine Shaw Lowell (wife of Charles Russell Lowell) and Robert Gould Shaw (who was killed at the Second Battle of Fort Wagner during the Civil War). Through his uncle Quincy Adams Shaw and, his wife, Pauline Agassiz Shaw, he was also a first cousin of wealthy landowner Robert Gould Shaw II (who was the first husband of Nancy Langhorne, who later became Viscountess Astor).

He graduated from a military academy in Ossining, New York.

== Career ==
Oliver served as a second lieutenant in the 5th Massachusetts Colored Cavalry at the age of 17. After the Civil War, he remained in the Army assigned to the 25th Army Corps in Texas and the 8th US Cavalry in California, Oregon and Arizona fighting in many Indian campaigns until 1869. He returned to Boston after leaving the Army and then moved to Albany, where he joined the New York National Guard in 1873 as colonel of the 10th Regiment.

From 1881 to 1903, he was employed by Rathbone, Sard & Co., stove manufacturers in Albany. In 1881, he was elected as the first president of the United States National Lawn Association, known today as the USTA. He served as brigadier general of the 5th Brigade and then of the 3rd Brigade in the New York National Guard. In 1903, he was appointed Assistant Secretary of War by President Theodore Roosevelt and continued under President William Howard Taft, serving for ten years.

General Oliver spoke at the dedication of several monuments to Civil War Union Units from Pennsylvania at the Antietam Battlefield in 1904. The content of his speech can be found in the reference.

== Personal life ==
In 1870, Oliver was married to Marion Lucy Rathbone (1847–1926), a daughter of General John Finley Rathbone and Mary (née Baker) Rathbone. They had four children:

- John Rathbone Oliver (1872–1943), who was a Harvard graduate, priest, scholar, and physician.
- Elizabeth Shaw Oliver (1874–1951), who married Francis Kerby Stevens (1877–1945).
- Cora Lyman Oliver (1876–1955), who married Joseph H. Choate Jr., son of Ambassador Joseph Hodges Choate and suffragist Caroline Dutcher Sterling Choate.
- Marion Lucy Oliver (1879–1936), who died unmarried.

Oliver died on March 15, 1935, in Charleston, South Carolina, and was cremated and buried with his wife, Marion in the Albany Rural Cemetery according to the Cemetery's Burial Cards.

=== Descendants ===
Through his daughter Cora, he was a grandfather of Helen (née Choate) Platt (1906–1974), great-grandfather of diplomat Nicholas Platt, the former U.S. Ambassador to Zambia, the Philippines, and Pakistan; and a great-great-grandfather of actor Oliver Platt. Also through Cora, he was a grandfather of Marion (née Choate) Harding (1905–1979), who married Charles Barney Harding, who served as chairman of the New York Stock Exchange and Smith, Barney & Co. (founded by his grandfather Charles D. Barney).
