= Ending Federal Marijuana Prohibition Act =

US marijuana decriminalization bills

- Long title: To decriminalize marijuana at the Federal level, to leave to the States a power to regulate marijuana that is similar to the power they have to regulate alcohol, and for other purposes.
- Sponsored by: Multiple lead sponsors in House and Senate

The Ending Federal Marijuana Prohibition Act is a series of federal marijuana decriminalization bills that have been introduced multiple times in the United States Congress.

The bills propose to legalize and end the prohibition of marijuana at the federal level by amending the United States Code (removing Marijuana from the Controlled Substances Act). The bills eliminate criminal penalties for an individual who imports, exports, manufactures, distributes, or possesses with intent to distribute marijuana. Unless in violation of the laws of the jurisdiction thereof: they would allow the shipment and transportation of marijuana between states and territories of the United States, and exportation and importation to and from foreign states. They would transfer the authority to regulate marijuana from the Drug Enforcement Administration to the Bureau of Alcohol, Tobacco, Firearms, and Explosives.

== Background ==
The use, sale and possession of cannabis (marijuana) in the United States is illegal under federal law. However, some states have created exemptions for medical cannabis use, as well as decriminalized non-medical cannabis use. In eleven states, Colorado, Washington, Oregon, California, Alaska, Illinois, Nevada, Massachusetts, Michigan, Maine, and Vermont, the sale and possession of marijuana is legal for both medical and non-medical use. These laws are still somewhat uncertain however, because the states have one year to write laws on distribution and regulation of marijuana.

In July 2009, Gil Kerlikowske, Director of the Office of National Drug Control Policy, further clarified the federal government's position when he stated that "marijuana is dangerous and has no medicinal benefit" and that "legalization is not in the president's vocabulary, and it's not in mine." However, a January 2010 settlement between the U.S. Drug Enforcement Administration and the Wo/Men's Alliance for Medical Marijuana (WAMM) provides an example confirming the administration policy as communicated by Attorney General Holder, as WAMM reached an agreement to re-open after being shut down by the federal government in 2002.

On November 6, 2012, voters in Colorado and Washington approved measures that legalize non-medical use of cannabis—the first states in the nation to do so.

After the election in 2012, the Office of National Drug Control Policy of the Obama administration stated that it "steadfastly opposes legalization of marijuana and other drugs because legalization would increase the availability and use of illicit drugs, and pose significant health and safety risks".

According to a 2013 survey by Pew Research Center, a majority of Americans are in favor of complete or partial legalization of cannabis. The survey showed 52% of respondents support cannabis legalization and 45% do not. College graduates' support increased from 39% to 52% in just three years, the support of self-identified conservative republicans (a group not traditionally supportive of cannabis legalization) has increased to nearly 30%, and bipartisan support has increased across the board.

== Provisions of the bills ==
This summary is based largely on the summary provided by the Congressional Research Service, a public domain source.

The series of bills were introduced into the 112th Congress (as H.R. 2306, the Ending Federal Marijuana Prohibition Act of 2011), the 113th Congress (as H.R.499, the Ending Federal Marijuana Prohibition Act of 2013), the 114th Congress (as S. 2237, the Ending Federal Marijuana Prohibition Act of 2015), the 115th Congress (as H.R. 1227, the Ending Federal Marijuana Prohibition Act of 2017) and the 116th Congress (as H.R. 1588).

The Ending Federal Marijuana Prohibition Act of 2013 would have directed the Attorney General to issue a final order that removes marijuana in any form from all federal schedules of controlled substances under the Controlled Substances Act. It would have amended the Controlled Substances Act to:

(1) provide that schedules I, II, III, IV, and V shall consist of the drugs and other substances that are set forth in the respective schedules in part 1308 of title 21 of the Code of Federal Regulations;
(2) exempt marijuana from such Act except as provided in this Act;
(3) revise the definition of "felony drug offense" to exclude conduct relating to marijuana; and
(4) eliminate marijuana from provisions setting forth penalties applicable to prohibited conduct under such Act.

The Ending Federal Marijuana Prohibition Act of 2013 would have prohibited shipping or transporting marijuana from any place outside a jurisdiction of the United States into such a jurisdiction in which its possession, use, or sale is prohibited.

The Ending Federal Marijuana Prohibition Act of 2013 would have also eliminated marijuana as:

(1) a controlled substance for purposes of the Controlled Substances Import and Export Act or the National Forest System Drug Control Act of 1986,
(2) a dangerous drug for purposes of federal criminal code provisions authorizing interception of communications, and
(3) a targeted drug for purposes of provisions of the national youth anti-drug media campaign under the Office of National Drug Control Policy Reauthorization Act of 1998.

The bills would have amended the Federal Alcohol Administration Act to set forth procedures for the issuance and revocation by the United States Secretary of the Treasury of permits for importing, shipping or selling in interstate or foreign commerce, purchasing for resale, producing, packaging, or warehousing marijuana. The bill would have prohibited any person from engaging in such conduct without a permit, subject to a $1,000 fine and/or a $500 payment. It also would have established criteria for ineligible applicants and disqualifying offenses.

The Ending Federal Marijuana Prohibition Act of 2013 would have subjected marijuana to the provisions that apply to: (1) intoxicating liquors under the Original Packages Act, the Webb-Kenyon Act, and the Victims of Trafficking and Violence Protection Act of 2000; and (2) distilled spirits under the Federal Alcohol Administration Act.

The bill would have granted the Food and Drug Administration (FDA) the same authorities with respect to marijuana as it has for alcohol. It would have transferred functions of the Administrator of the Drug Enforcement Administration (DEA) relating to marijuana enforcement to the Director of the Bureau of Alcohol, Tobacco, Firearms, and Explosives (ATF). The bill would have renamed: (1) ATF as the Bureau of Alcohol, Tobacco, Marijuana, Firearms and Explosives; and (2) the Alcohol and Tobacco Tax and Trade Bureau as the Alcohol, Tobacco, and Marijuana Tax and Trade Bureau.

Finally, the bill have directed the Comptroller General to review federal laws, regulations, and policies to determine if changes are desirable in light of this Act.

== Procedural history ==
The Ending Federal Marijuana Prohibition Act of 2013 was introduced into the United States House of Representatives on February 5, 2013 by Rep. Jared Polis (D, CO-2). It was referred to the United States House Committee on the Judiciary, the United States House Committee on Energy and Commerce, the United States House Committee on Ways and Means, the United States House Committee on Natural Resources, and the United States House Committee on Agriculture immediately. It was subsequently referred to the United States House Energy Subcommittee on Health (February 8, 2013), the United States House Natural Resources Subcommittee on Public Lands and Environmental Regulation (February 14, 2013), United States House Agriculture Subcommittee on Conservation, Energy, and Forestry (February 25, 2013), and the United States House Judiciary Subcommittee on Crime, Terrorism, Homeland Security and Investigations (February 28, 2013).

== Debate and discussion ==
Organizations such as National Organization for the Reform of Marijuana Laws (NORML) supported the bill. Also the editorial board of The New York Times expressed support for repealing the federal ban on marijuana.

== Sponsors and co-sponsors ==
- The 2011 House bill (112th Congress, H.R. 2306) was introduced by Representative Barney Frank and was cosponsored by Representative Ron Paul, John Conyers, Barbara Lee, Jared Polis, and Steve Cohen.
- The 2013 House bill (113th Congress, H.R. 499) was introduced by Representative Jared Polis. There were nine original co-sponsors; this rose to 18 co-sponsors (17 Democrats and 1 Republican).
- The 2015 Senate bill (114th Congress, S. 2237) was introduced by Senator Bernie Sanders, with no co-sponsors.
- The 2017 House bill (115th Congress, H.R. 1227) was introduced by Representative Thomas Garrett, Jr. and has 39 co-sponsors.
- The 2019 House bill (116th Congress, H.R. 1588) was introduced by Representative Tulsi Gabbard and has 36 co-sponsors.
