= Jesper Harding =

American publisher (1799–1865)

Jesper Harding (November 5, 1799 – August 21, 1865) was an American publisher in Philadelphia.

== Early life ==
Harding was born on November 5, 1799, in Philadelphia, a son of George Harding and Mary (née Hudd) Harding. His father was one of four brothers who emigrated from England to Canada and then to Philadelphia where he became a ship's carpenter and acquired significant property.

== Career ==
After being educated in the local schools, Harding learned the printing trade from the publisher Enos Bronson. After first starting his career in the office of the United States Gazette he started his own business in 1815 at the age of 16. Eleven years later, in November 1829, he purchased the Pennsylvania Inquirer newspaper from John Norvell and John R. Walker. About the same time he began printing Bibles and became the largest publisher of Bibles in the United States.

Initially a supporter of Andrew Jackson, Harding attempted to simultaneously support Jackson while also defending the directors of the Bank of the United States, which Jackson fiercely opposed. Harding later switched support (and his newspaper's editorial stance) to the anti-Jackson faction within the Democratic-Republican Party and in 1836 supported the Whig candidate William Henry Harrison for president. After this, Harding's newspaper became an advocate for the cause of the Whig party, until it was weakened by internal divisions in 1852.

Harding also manufactured paper at a manufacturing plant in Trenton, New Jersey, in what was the largest paper mill in the United States, along with a large iron works in Trenton. Harding merged the Pennsylvania Inquirer with the Daily Courier in 1839, and for a while the paper was known as The Pennsylvania Inquirer and Daily Courier. In 1845, it was called The Pennsylvania Inquirer and National Gazette. Harding retired from publishing in 1859, succeeded by his son William White Harding, who changed the paper's name to the present The Philadelphia Inquirer in 1860.

At the time of his death, Harding was Collector of United States Internal Revenue for the First District.

== Personal life ==
Harding was married to Maria Wilson (1798–1862), a daughter of Dr. Wilson of Lancaster, Pennsylvania. Together, they were the parents of six children, including:

- George Harding (1827–1902), who became a patent lawyer and argued several cases before the U.S. Supreme Court and who married Charlotte Ludlow Kenner (1839–1890).
- William White Harding (1830–1889), who succeeded his father as publisher of the paper who married Catharine Badger Hart (1838–1924).
- James Barclay Harding (1830–1865), who married Georgiana Maria Gallagher (1838–1905).

His wife died on June 2, 1862. Harding died on August 21, 1865, at the residence of his eldest son in Chestnut Hill. In his obituary in The New York Times, he was referred to as "one of the oldest and best known publishers in the United States."

=== Descendants ===
Through his son William, Harding was a grandfather of Jessie Harding Morris (1865–1952), wife of Alfred Hennen Morris, and J. Horace Harding, was a financier and married Dorothea Barney, a daughter of Charles D. Barney and granddaughter of Civil War financier Jay Cooke.
