= Constance Weissman =

American socialite, journalist and Marxist activist

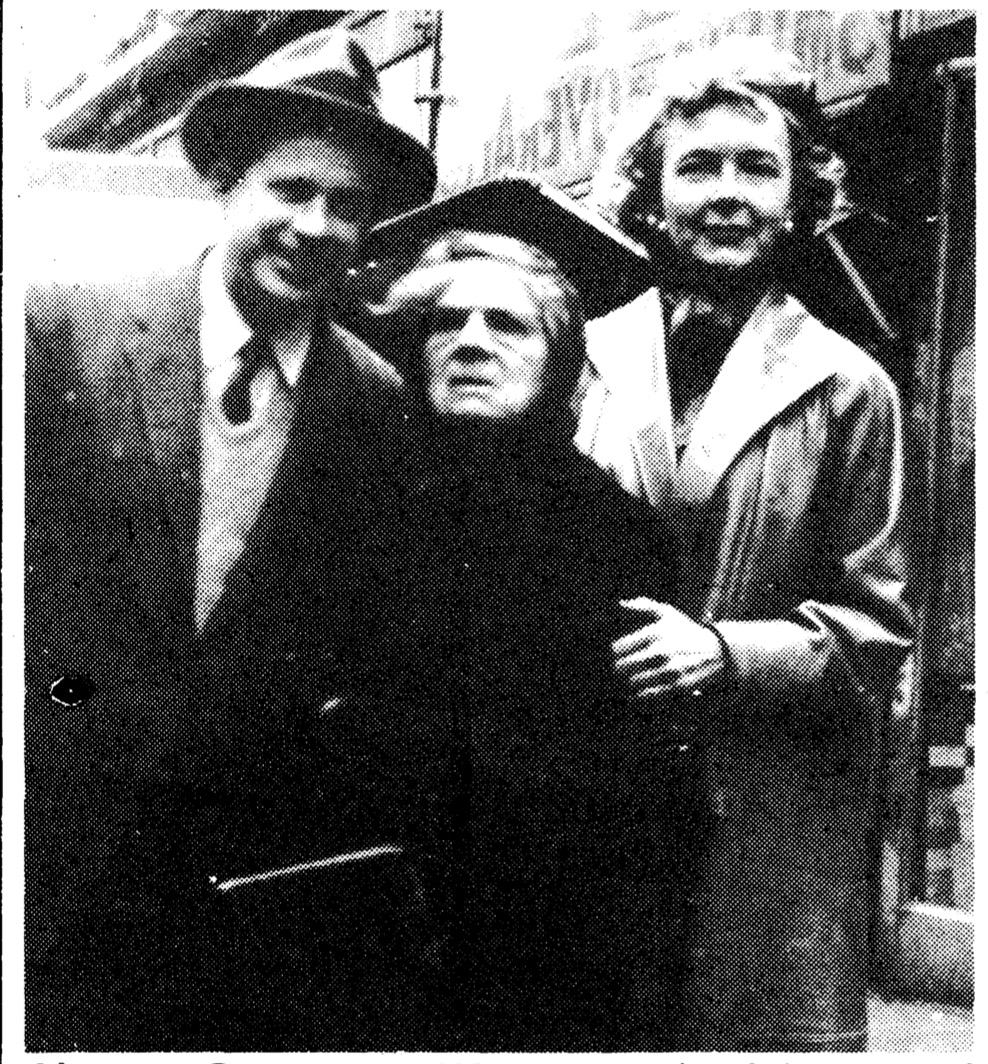
Constance Weissman (right) with George Lavan Weissman and Natalia Sedova

Constance Fox Weissman (March 28, 1908 – January 8, 1972) was an American socialite, Marxist activist and member of the Socialist Workers Party.

== Family and early life ==
Constance Fox was born on March 28, 1908, in New York City. She came from a family that was prominent in New York finance and politics. Her father, Edward Lyttleton Fox, was a prominent lawyer. Her mother, Genevieve O’Brien came from a wealthy Irish-Catholic family. Her uncle was New York Supreme Court Judge Kenneth O'Brien. Constance's maternal grandfather, Morgan J. O’Brien, was a judge on the New York Supreme Court and a prominent philanthropist. The family's politics were conservative. O’Brien used his position as a public figure to criticize socialism in 1906, and argue for an increase in religious instruction to combat its rise.

Constance grew up on the Upper East Side, at her family's house on 136 E. 72nd St. The Foxes also spent their summers in Southampton where they had a summer home called Foxhole. As a child she and her siblings were frequently featured in newspapers, described as “society’s children”. She attended the Todhunter School, an experimental educational institution founded by Winifred Todhunter. Constance also attended occasional classes at Columbia University in French and drama but never attended college as a full-time student. She made her debut in society in the winter of 1926. For this occasion, her portrait by Charles Sheeler was featured in Vogue. According to her obituary, when she was in the Junior League after her debut, she lobbied for the elimination of laws banning teaching about birth-control, despite her family's Catholicism.

== First marriage ==
In March 1929, Constance became engaged to William Barclay Harding, the son of J. Horace Harding, who worked as an investment banker with Charles D. Barney & Co. They were married May 30, 1929, at the Ambassador Hotel in Manhattan. The couple lived in Manhattan and a farm in Rumson, New Jersey. William B. Harding was a flying enthusiast, having purchased a Waco airplane in 1928. Constance soon joined him in learning how to fly, taking solo lessons and gaining a pilot's license in 1930. Besides her flying, her days were mainly spent volunteering for charities as a society hostess and attending society events. Among other notable events, she and her husband attended the 1939 three-day premiere of Gone with the Wind in Atlanta. Her society volunteer work first introduced her to political activism. In 1930, she worked to register women against the Volstead Act. In 1940, she was a member of the Democrats for Wilkie club, opposing Roosevelt's re-election, and served as the chairman of the parade committee for the group's "No Third Term Day" parade. As part of this effort, she was a member of the New Jersey delegation to the 1940 Republican National Convention in Philadelphia.

== Second marriage ==
By 1941, her marriage to Harding had failed. The couple separated in April 1941, and she received sole custody of their three children and a payment of $350,000. In May 1943, she moved to Reno temporarily to establish residency and obtain a divorce. The same year, she met George Lavan Weissman, a Marxist activist who was enlisted in the army, while volunteering in the USO canteen. They were married in September. She began to study Marxism and joined the Socialist Workers Party, renouncing her family's Catholicism in the process.

== Socialist activism ==
In 1943, she began working with the Civil Rights Defense Committee, a group of SWP members defending the rights of the jailed SWP leaders, including Carl Skoglund and James Kutcher, who had been imprisoned under the Smith Act in 1940. She later worked as the business manager of Fourth International (the SWP's theoretical journal) and was an organizer for the American Committee for European Workers Relief, a group that sent supplies, medicine and food to radicals in postwar Europe. In addition, she also worked as a secretary for Tom Kerry and for the SWP's national office in New York.

She was eventually recognized as an important member of the Party at this time, and was included by Paul Le Blanc in his list of the “most prominent members of the Cannon faction” who followed the ideas of James P. Cannon. Together with her husband, she worked to ensure ballot access for the SWP in states where the party it was not represented. Once she had been educated in Marxist theory and ideas, she began to work as a journalist. George Weissman worked as a journalist and editor for The Militant, and she contributed occasional articles and reviews to the paper from 1963 through her death. She was also a contributor to International Socialist Review.

Using her personal fortune in 1948, Constance purchased a farm in Washington, New Jersey, which she turned over for the SWP's use as Mountain Spring Camp. The Party held conventions here and hosted a Marxist school for new members. This continued until September 1962, when the FBI, as part of its COINTELPRO program, worked with local police to raid the camp, on the grounds that it was serving liquor without a license. Constance was indicted in this raid, along with other SWP members who were working there.

She established a friendship with Natalia Sedova, Trotsky's widow, that began with a visit to Mexico in 1948. Sedova continued to visit with the Weissmans when she came to America through 1957. Following the Cuban Revolution she traveled to Havana with Dorothea Breitman and Sarah Lovell touring local industries to view post-revolutionary Cuba for themselves. She wrote an enthusiastic report about the Cuban trip in The Militant, describing it as some “of the most wonderful days of our lives”.

Weissman died on January 8, 1972, of arteriosclerosis. Her funeral was attended by almost 300 people, making it one of the largest memorials for any member of the SWP. In addition to speeches by fellow members of the New York SWP branch, tributes were read from Maxwell Geismar, Ernest Mandel, and Chen Bilan.
