= George Lavan Weissman =

American Marxist activist and journalist

Weissman c. 1985

George Lavan Weissman (December 14, 1916 – March 28, 1985) was an American Marxist activist, journalist, and Socialist Workers Party leader.

== Early life ==
Weissman was born in Chicago and grew up in Boston, where he was educated at Boston Latin School. There he served as an assistant business manager of the Boston School Register, the student newspaper. Following this, he attended Harvard, where he became active in the Marxist circles and joined the Young People's Socialist League. After the expulsion of the Trotskyists from the Socialist Party in 1938, he was a founding member of the Socialist Workers Party in 1938, along with Larry Trainor and Antoinette Konikow, among others. During the Spanish Civil War, Weissman attempted to go to Spain to fight with the Loyalists but was prevented by the theft of his money while he was traveling to Algeria. In 1941, Weissman was drafted into the army. In 1943 at the USO canteen in New Jersey, he met Constance Fox Harding, a wealthy New York society leader, who was volunteering there. They were married in September, after Constance received a divorce in June from her husband, William Barclay Harding. Following their marriage, Constance joined the SWP and remained a party member and Trotskyist until her death in 1971.

== Political activism ==
Weissman began his work with the SWP as a branch organizer in Boston and Youngstown between 1939 and 1946. He then moved to New York, where he served as the editor and director of the SWP's publishing operations Pioneer Publishers and Pathfinder Press until 1981. In addition, he also worked as a manager of Mountain Spring Camp in New Jersey, a vacation retreat for the SWP that also hosted a training school for the Marxist education of new members. The land for the camp had been purchased in 1948 by Constance Weissman and donated to the party.

He also worked as the business manager and editor for The Militant, the SWP's daily newspaper. During his editorship, the newspaper attracted national controversy for its involvement in the Kennedy assassination, as Lee Harvey Oswald was revealed to be a subscriber. Following the assassination of Kennedy, the SWP's Political Committee met at Weissman's house to decide on a public response, given the party's role as leftist critics of Kennedy. Although he was open about his Trotskyist beliefs and party membership, Weissman was one of SWP members named by Herbert Hill to the FBI.

In addition to his party work, Weissman was active in civil rights activism and helped found the committee to Combat Racial Injustice (CCRI), and served as its secretary. The Committee worked to aid James Hanover Thompson and David Simpson who were falsely accused and jailed in the 1958 Kissing Case in Monroe, North Carolina. In 1964, the FBI created a poem accusing Weissman of stealing money from the home of A.E. Perry, the Monroe head of the committee to Aid Monroe Defendants. According to Nelson Blackstock, this gives Weissman “the dubious distinction of being the first publicly known subject of an FBI poem”. Copies of this poem were mailed by the FBI to nine prominent political figures including James Baldwin, Harold Cruse, and Tim Wohlforth.

== Party expulsion and later life ==
Following Constance's 1972 death, George married Muriel Gravelle McAvoy in 1973. (McAvoy was the widow of American Labor Party candidate Clifford T. McAvoy.) In 1984, Weissman was expelled from the SWP. The party, under the leadership of Jack Barnes, had turned away from Trotskyist ideas of permanent revolution and attempted to follow the model of the Cuban revolution and Castroism. This shift proved controversial for older SWP members such as Weissman, who were expelled following their protests of the Party's new direction. During a confrontation with Barnes and other members, Weissman defended himself, declaring “I’m a Trotskyist; I still believe in Permanent Revolution and I refuse to regress to the Democratic Dictatorship of the Proletariat and Peasantry." Following his break with the SWP, Weissman joined fellow expelled members, such as George Breitman and Frank Lovell, to form the Fourth Internationalist Tendency, a group arguing against the SWP's approach towards Trotskyism and Cuba.

== Publications ==
In addition to articles and editorials for The Militant (written under the penname George Lavan), Weissman was the editor of two books. In 1967, he published Che Guevara Speaks, the first English anthology of Guevara’s writings and speeches. In 1980, Weissman published The Balkan Wars, 1912-13: The War Correspondence of Leon Trotsky. In addition, Weissman was a friend of Betty Shabazz and was able to use this connection to assist with Pathfinder Press’ publication of Malcolm X's speeches.
