= Laura Barney Harding =

American socialite and philanthropist (1902–1994)

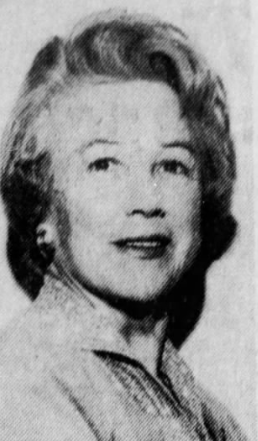
Laura Barney Harding, 1971, Asbury Park Press

Laura Barney Harding (June 2, 1902 – August 9, 1994) was an American socialite and philanthropist. She became a close friend of Katharine Hepburn in the late 1920s when they were both aspiring actresses; the two travelled together to California to seek work in films, and shared a house in Franklin Canyon Park, near Hollywood.

== Early life ==
Laura Barney Harding was born on June 2, 1902, to James Horace Harding and Dorothea Barney in the family home at 1816 South Rittenhouse Square, and grew up in a townhouse on Fifth Avenue, New York City. Her mother was Jay Cooke's granddaughter and Charles D. Barney's daughter. Both of her brothers, Charles Barney Harding and William Barclay Harding, served as chairman of the family firm Smith, Barney & Co. She debuted into society aged 18 in 1920 at the Plaza Hotel, accompanied by Wilmarth Sheldon Lewis.

Harding was invited to a dance hosted by Anne Harriman Vanderbilt in 1921, confirming her position among American high society. Harding's sister, Cammie, married polo player Lorillard Suffern Tailer.

Harding attended Miss Porter's School but did not go to college. In 1967, Monmouth College awarded Harding with an honorary degree of doctor in humane letters.

== Career ==
In summer 1929, Harding began work with the Berkshire Players in Stockbridge, New York, performing W. Somerset Maugham's Caroline. The cast included a young James Cagney and Jane Wyatt. In autumn, she joined the Dramatic League of Chicago, performing Thunder in the Air. After the press wrote that "an heiress to a seven-million-dollar fortune" was working with the company, she quit. "I do not want any publicity," she said: "I want my work to be judged on nothing but merit. I simply will not have people come to stare at me because they have found out who I am." She returned to the Berkshire Players, where she became friends with Hepburn.

About this time, Harding met Hepburn when they were students of voice instructor Frances Robinson-Duff in New York City. At Robinson-Duff’s suggestion, they both accepted work at the Berkshire Playhouse and became close friends. The pair rented a Victorian house on Devon Road in the upstate town of Lee, New York, that was owned by Edward C. Bradley, and became close to Bradley's daughters.

In 1930 Hepburn and Harding worked together in James M. Barrie's The Admirable Crichton, playing Lady Agatha and Lady Catherine respectively. The play was directed by a young Alexander Kirkland, an associate of Eva Le Gallienne.

The press began calling Harding "Katharine Hepburn's other half". The pair moved to the West Coast to launch Hepburn's Hollywood career, and Harding took care of Hepburn, including wardrobe design, acting as a press agent and negotiating with producers and directors. Harding once described herself facetiously as "Miss Hepburn's husband". Hers was the most private and enduring of all of Hepburn’s friendships with women. "I think it's fair to say," Hepburn later said, "that Laura Harding saved my life."

Harding introduced Hepburn to Leland Hayward, son of attorney Colonel William Hayward, who became Hepburn's lover and agent. Harding lived with Hepburn for four years and put her own career on hold, concentrating on Hepburn's. She later told friends this was the happiest time the pair spent together before Hepburn became famous.

During World War II Harding organized dances and parties for the National Guardsmen in Eatontown. She volunteered at the Stage Door Canteen in New York City.

She was president from 1954 to 1970 and chairman of the board from 1970 to 1974 of the MCOSS Nursing Services, a non-profit volunteer organization serving patients in Monmouth, Middlesex, and Ocean New Jersey counties. She campaigned to convert the Bendix plant in Red Bank, New Jersey, into a health center, subsequently named the Geraldine L. Thompson Building after the MCOSS founder.

In 1955 she was the assistant of Cecil Beaton, scenic designer for the Broadway production of The Chalk Garden.

In 1968 Harding was named woman of the year by the Business and Professional Women's Clubs of Monmouth County. In 1971 the MCOSS Nursing Services set up the Laura Harding Scholarship fund to provide grants and loans for training nurses. In 1974 she received the Brotherhood Award from the American Conference of Christians and Jews.

In 1990 a medical center in Manasquan, New Jersey, was named in her honor, the Laura Harding Health Center, and her birthday, June 2, was declared Laura Harding Day in Monmouth County, New Jersey.

She was active in the Republican Party (she was the Republican Committeewoman of the 5th District in Holmdel) and the Society for the Prevention of Cruelty to Animals. She was vice-president of the Riverview Hospital's board, and president of the board of managers at the New Jersey Diagnostic Center in Menlo Park. She was a member of the Monmouth Park Charity Fund and on the board of the Old Monmouth Training Club and the Monmouth County SPCA.

== Personal life ==
After Hepburn's career took off, Harding lived at Beekman Place, New York, and owned the Bayonet Farm in Holmdel, New Jersey, which Hepburn regularly visited. Harding also owned a house in Mantoloking, New Jersey, which people mistook for being Hepburn's because of her frequent visits.

Harding was paired with society men like Wilmarth Lewis, a collector of Horace Walpole memorabilia, Carleton Burke, a polo player who lived in Berkeley Square, Los Angeles, and Fortune reporter Russell "Mitch" Davenport. Her close friends included Hope Williams, a fellow graduate of Miss Porter’s and a member of the Junior League, and her lover Mercedes de Acosta, Clifton Webb, Gertrude Lawrence, Guthrie McClintic and his wife Katharine Cornell, Lillie Messenger, a Hollywood talent scout, Philip Barry, Beatrice Lillie, Elsie Janis, Noël Coward, Eunice Stoddard, Cheryl Crawford and her lover, Dorothy Patten.

One of Harding's last public appearances was at the premiere of Rich and Famous, director George Cukor's last film, in 1981. Afterwards, Harding and Cukor attended a gala reception together.

Harding died on August 9, 1994, aged 92.
