= Alfred Hennen Morris =

American businessman, politician, and racehorse owner

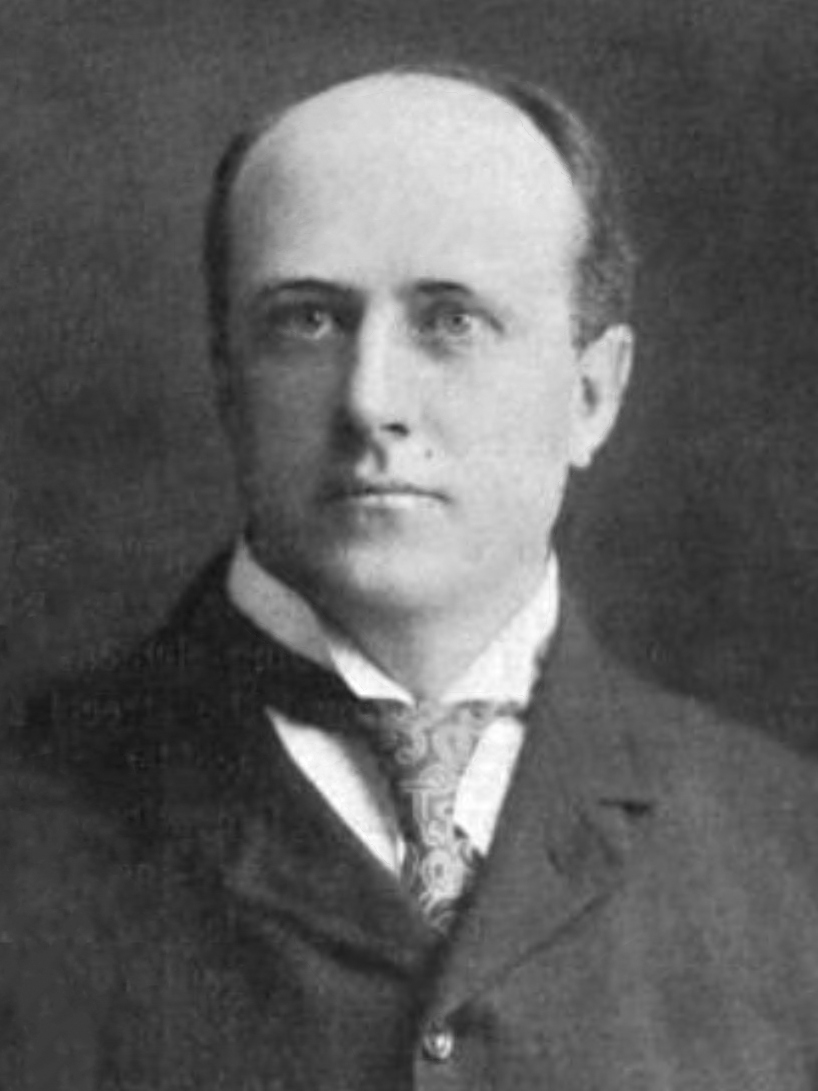

Member of the New York State Assembly for Westchester County's 2nd District
- In office January 1, 1893 – December 31, 1893
- Preceded by: William Ryan
- Succeeded by: John Berry

Personal details
- Born: March 3, 1864 Wilmington, Delaware, United States
- Died: July 9, 1959 (aged 95) New York City, United States
- Party: Democrat
- Spouse: Jessie Harding (after 1889)
- Relations: Dave Hennen Morris (brother); Alice Vanderbilt Morris (sister-in-law); Lewis Cass Ledyard (brother-in-law)
- Children: 2
- Parent(s): John Albert Morris; Cora Hennen
- Education: Harvard University

Alfred Hennen Morris (March 3, 1864 – July 9, 1959) was an American businessman politician, and racehorse owner/breeder.

== Early life ==
Morris was born in Wilmington, Delaware on March 3, 1864. He was the son of John Albert Morris and Cora Hennen, the daughter of prominent New Orleans Judge Alfred Hennen, a Justice of the Louisiana Supreme Court. His siblings included Dave Hennen Morris (1872–1944), the United States Ambassador to Belgium and Envoy to Luxembourg who married Alice Vanderbilt Shepard, and Frances Isabel Morris, who married Lewis Cass Ledyard (1851–1932), the prominent attorney.

His father, the Louisiana Lottery "king", was descended from the Colonial Morris family of Morrisania. His grandfather, Francis Morris, owned the mare Ruthless, who won the first Belmont Stakes in 1867.

Morris graduated from Harvard University in 1885.

== Career ==
In 1893, Morris served a term in the New York Legislature as a member of the Assembly for the 116th New York State Legislature, succeeding William Ryan who was elected to the 53rd U.S. Congress on November 8, 1892. After he finished out his term, he became the Supervisor of the Town of Westchester from 1892 to 1904. He was also appointed a school commissioner for Manhattan and The Bronx in 1900 by Mayor Robert Anderson Van Wyck.

In 1907, the Morris brothers were involved with the Honduras lottery. They were both indicted but later cleared of any wrongdoing.

=== Thoroughbred horse racing ===
His father, and grandfather, were prominent figures in Thoroughbred horse racing, and his father owned the Morris Park Racetrack in The Bronx, New York. Morris and his brother, Dave, owned, bred, and raced a number of successful Thoroughbreds. Among their major racing wins were the 1898 Belmont Stakes with Bowling Brook, and the 1899 Kentucky Derby with Manuel. Their scarlet racing colors are the oldest in continuous use by one family in the United States.

From 1889 until 1904, Morris was in charge of the Morris Park Racetrack in the Bronx. When Philip J. Dwyer, treasurer of the Monmonth Park Association, resigned on August 3, 1893, Alfred Morris took over the management of the troubled racetrack. Morris served as Vice-Chairman and steward of The Jockey Club from 1942 to 1947.

=== Yacht racing ===
Morris was also involved in yacht racing. He was a member of the New York Yacht Club and active in racing his yachts Gardenia and Jasmine. In 1907, the Gardenia, his yacht, won the Pierce Cup.

Morris was a member of The Metropolitan Club, Manhattan Club, Country Club, the Automobile Club of America, and the Seawanhaka Corinthian Yacht Club.

== Personal life ==
In 1889, he married Jessie Harding (b. 1865) of Philadelphia, the daughter of William White Harding, sister of banker J. Horace Harding, and granddaughter of Jesper Harding who had owned The Philadelphia Inquirer newspaper. They had residences in Westchester, known as Avylon, and in New York City, at 68 Broad Street. Together, they were the parents of:

- John Alfred Morris II (1892–1985), who married Edna Loew Brokaw (1908–1997), the granddaughter of merchant Isaac Vail Brokaw.
- Cora Hennen Morris (1893–1984), a doctor who married Dr. Alfred H. Ehrenclou (1884–1965), in 1926.

Morris died at his home, 925 Park Avenue in New York City, on July 9, 1959. He was buried at Church of St. James the Less in Philadelphia, Pennsylvania.

New York State Assembly
| Preceded by William Ryan | Member of the New York State Assembly for Westchester County, 2nd District; 1893–1893 | Succeeded by John Berry |
