= William Ryan (53rd Congress) =

American politician

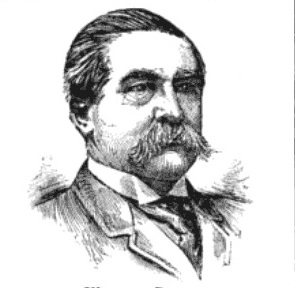
- William Ryan (1840-1925), U.S. Congressman from New York

Member of the New York State Assembly for Westchester County, 2nd District
- In office 1891–1892
- Preceded by: Bradford Rhodes
- Succeeded by: Alfred Hennen Morris

Member of the U.S. House of Representatives from New York's 16th district
- In office March 4, 1893 – March 3, 1895
- Preceded by: John H. Ketcham
- Succeeded by: Benjamin L. Fairchild

Personal details
- Born: March 8, 1840 County Tipperary, Ireland
- Died: February 17, 1925 (aged 84) Crescent City, Florida, U.S.
- Resting place: St. Mary's Cemetery, Greenwich, Connecticut, U.S.
- Party: Democratic

William Ryan (March 8, 1840 – February 17, 1925) was an American banker and businessman who served one term as a U.S. Representative from New York from 1893 1895.

== Biography ==
Born in County Tipperary in Ireland (then a part of the U.K.) on March 8, 1840, Ryan immigrated to the United States with his parents, who settled in Stanwich (now Greenwich, Connecticut) in 1844. He attended the local schools, worked on farms near Greenwich and taught school. In the spring of 1859, he went to the Rocky Mountains and engaged in prospecting and mining until 1861, when he settled in Port Chester, New York. Ryan was a successful farmer, merchant and banker.

== Political career ==
A Democrat, he served in local office including school board member. He was Town Supervisor of Rye from 1883 to 1885. In 1886, he was appointed Undersheriff of Westchester County and he served until 1889. He was a member of the New York State Assembly (Westchester Co., 2nd D.) in 1891 and 1892.

Ryan was elected to the 53rd Congress, serving from March 4, 1893, to March 3, 1895.

== Later career ==
Ryan resumed his business interests after leaving Congress, including serving as President of the Port Chester Savings Bank and operating a Florida ranch that produced oranges. He also served as President of the Village of Port Chester.

== Death and burial ==
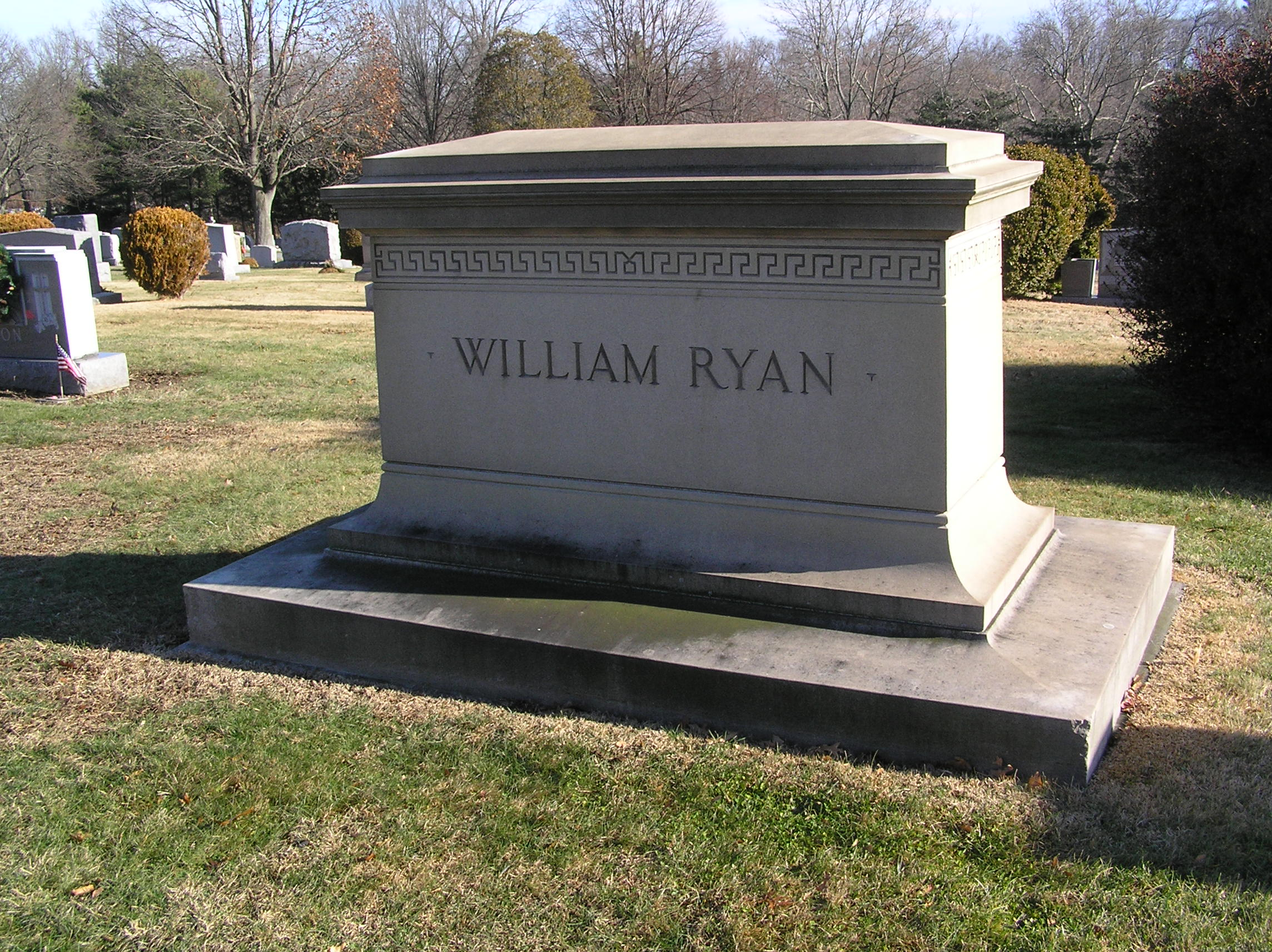
Ryan's gravesite in Saint Mary's Cemetery

Ryan died while visiting Crescent City, Florida on February 17, 1925. He was interred in St. Mary's Cemetery in Greenwich.

New York State Assembly
Preceded by Bradford Rhodes	New York State Assembly; Westchester County, 2nd District; 1891–1892	Succeeded by Alfred Hennen Morris
U.S. House of Representatives
Preceded by John H. Ketcham	Member of the U.S. House of Representatives from New York's 16th congressional district March 4, 1893 – March 3, 1895	Succeeded by Benjamin L. Fairchild
