= Choate House (Pleasantville, New York) =

Pace University art gallery in New York, US

Coordinates: 41°07′43″N 73°48′34″W

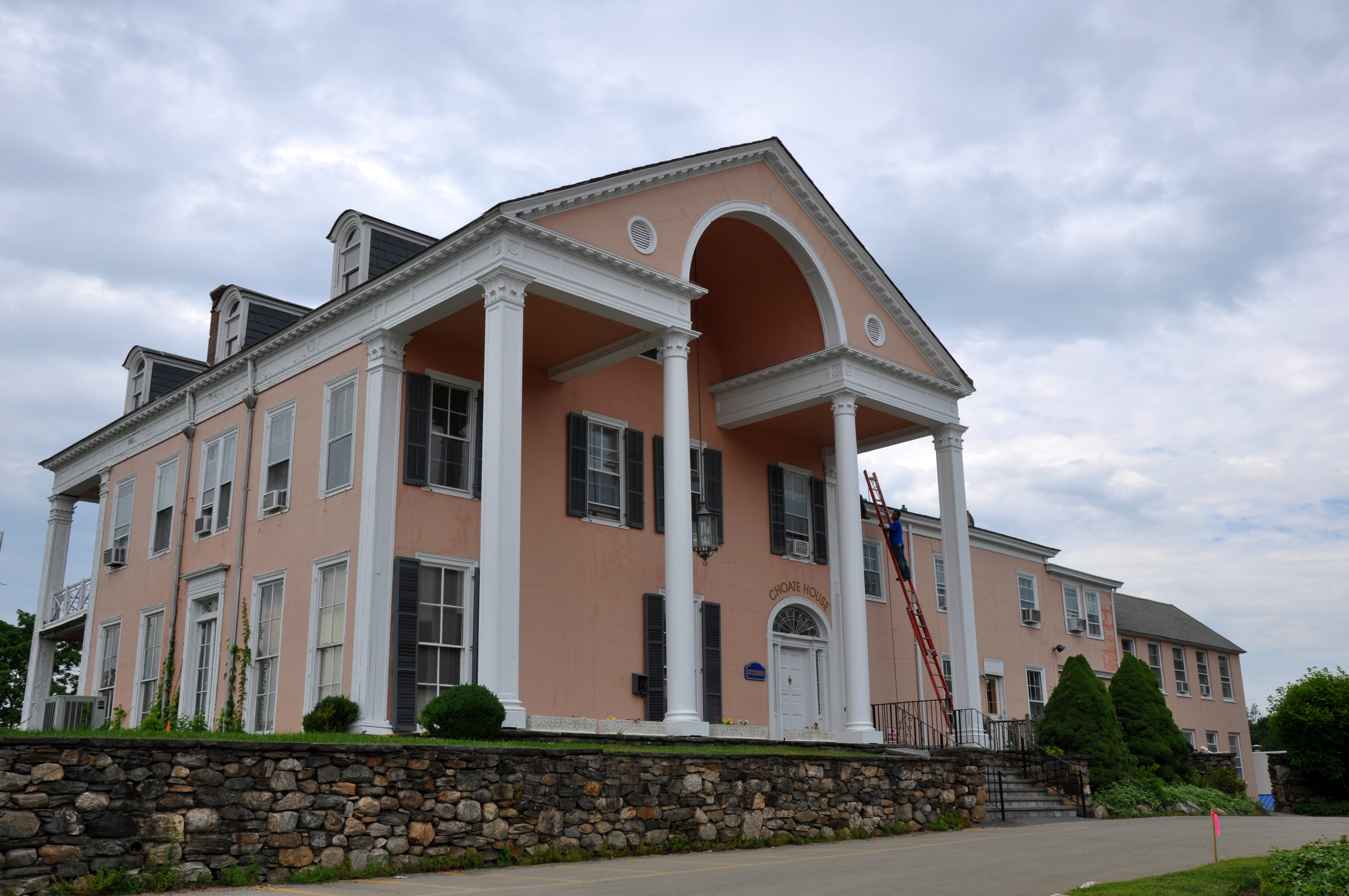
Choate House

Choate House was built in 1867 by shoe manufacturer Samuel Baker in what is now Pleasantville, New York. It later became the residence of Dr. George C. S. Choate. Choate added a wing as a private sanitarium to accommodate patients being treated for mental and nervous disorders. Horace Greeley was being treated there at the time of his death on November 29, 1872.

Choate died in 1896; the sanitarium closed ten years later. His widow, wanting to turn the house over to her newly married son as a wedding gift, decided to live in the wing after moving it down the hill to its present location near Bedford Road. The job of detaching the wing and moving it began on New Year’s Day 1909 and was completed in summer. Teams of horses pulled the building over logs to its new location. Mrs. Choate lived there until her death in 1926 at age 95.

Her dwelling subsequently had three more private owners: banker Dunham B. Scherer, advertising executive Lewis H. Titterton, and Wayne C. Marks, an alumnus and trustee of Pace College (now Pace University).

In 1962, Marks gave his home and surrounding acreage to Pace. His gift formed the nucleus of Pace's campus in Westchester County. The wing from Choate House is now a campus welcome center known as "Marks Hall."

Eventually, the original Choate House also became part of the campus. As a condition of its acquisition, Pace entered into an agreement with the Choate family to maintain the house in its original state and retain its original pink color. Choate House is visible from the Taconic Parkway. The building houses an office for the president and offices of the University's Dyson College of Arts & Sciences.
