= Voluntary Committee of Lawyers =

- Abbreviation: VCL
- Formation: 1927
- Purpose: Association Against the Prohibition Amendment
- Location: United States
- Key people: Joseph H. Choate, Jr.

The original Voluntary Committee of Lawyers (VCL) was founded in 1927 to bring about the repeal of prohibition and the Volstead Act. The VCL provided legal support for the Association Against the Prohibition Amendment, an umbrella organization that opposed prohibition. With its urging, the American Bar Association called for repeal in 1928. Under the leadership of Joseph H. Choate, Jr., lawyers in every state were actively involved in working to bring about repeal, which occurred in 1933. At that time, the VCL closed its books and ceased to exist.

== Modern incarnation ==
A modern version of the Voluntary Committee of Lawyers was incorporated in 1996, established through its founding committee, including former U.S. Attorneys General Elliot Richardson and Nicholas Katzenbach, former American Bar Association President George Bushnell, former federal judge A. Leon Higginbotham, Jr. and labor lawyer Theodore W. Kheel. The modern VCL was inspired by the earlier group of the same name, but focused on the modern war on drugs.

== See also ==
- Law and Society Association
