= New York State Route 25D =

Former state highway in New York State

New York State Route 25D

Route information
- Auxiliary route of NY 25
- Maintained by NYSDH
- Existed: c. 1933–1958

Major junctions
- West end: NY 24 / NY 25 in Elmhurst
- East end: NY 25 in Westbury

Location
- Country: United States
- State: New York
- Counties: Queens, Nassau

Highway system
- New York Highways; Interstate; US; State; Reference; Parkways
← NY 25C	→ NY 26

New York State Route 25D (NY 25D) was a state highway located on Long Island in the U.S. state of New York. It was originally the designation of Horace Harding Boulevard, Nassau Boulevard, and Powerhouse Road, the route of which the Long Island Expressway (Interstate 495) took over as it was constructed in the 1950s. The NY 25D designation along the LIE was replaced by NY 24 upon the completion of the expressway through Queens and western Nassau County in 1958.

== Route description ==
NY 25D, as of 1950, began at an intersection with NY 25 near the junction with NY 24 (Queens–Midtown Expressway). Known as Horace Harding Boulevard, NY 25D went east through western Queens, crossing through the Rego Park section of the city. East of Rego Park, the route crossed an interchange with exit 8 of the Grand Central Parkway. The route, named after financier J. Horace Harding, crossed through Flushing Meadows Park, paralleling to the north of NY 25 and the Grand Central Parkway.

Continuing northeast through eastern Queens, NY 25D continued along Horace Harding Boulevard, reaching the Cross Island Parkway near Alley Pond Park. The route crosses through the southern end of Douglaston, running northeast to the Nassau County. Paralleling the Northern State Parkway, the route ran northeast along local streets, crossing through the North Hills section of the county. Crossing through the area, the route made a bend south through Old Westbury. The route soon reached an intersection with NY 25, marking the eastern terminus of NY 25D.

== History ==
NY 25D was assigned c. 1933 to an alternate route of NY 25 between Bayside (at Springfield Boulevard, then-NY 25) and Westbury along Horace Harding Boulevard and Ellison Avenue (now Old Westbury Road). NY 25 was rerouted between 92nd Street and Springfield Boulevard c. 1941 to follow Queens Boulevard and Union Turnpike through eastern Queens. The former routing of NY 25 between 92nd and Springfield became an extension of NY 25D. NY 25D was also realigned slightly on its eastern end to follow Roslyn Road, Main Street, and Broadway to a new eastern terminus at NY 25A in Roslyn. The route was later extended northward along Bryant Avenue to end at Glen Cove Road in East Hills, and realigned to proceed east and south on Westbury Road to NY 25 east of NY 25B in Westbury.

In the 1950s, the routing of NY 25D through eastern Queens and western Nassau County was converted into a limited-access highway as part of the construction of the Long Island Expressway across Long Island. Horace Harding Boulevard, and parts of Nassau Boulevard, and Powerhouse Road were then converted into service roads for the expressway while NY 25D was moved onto the expressway as it was completed. When the portion of the expressway in Queens and western Nassau County was completed in 1958, NY 25D was replaced with a rerouted NY 24.

The portion of NY 25D in Queens was ceremoniously named World's Fair Boulevard in 1939 and 1940 for the 1939 New York World's Fair.

== Major intersections ==
County	Location	mi	km	Destinations	Notes
Queens	Bayside			NY 24 / NY 25	
Nassau	East Hills			Glen Cove Road	
Nassau	Westbury			NY 25	
1.000 mi = 1.609 km; 1.000 km = 0.621 mi
