= Charles D. Barney =

American stockbroker (1844–1945)

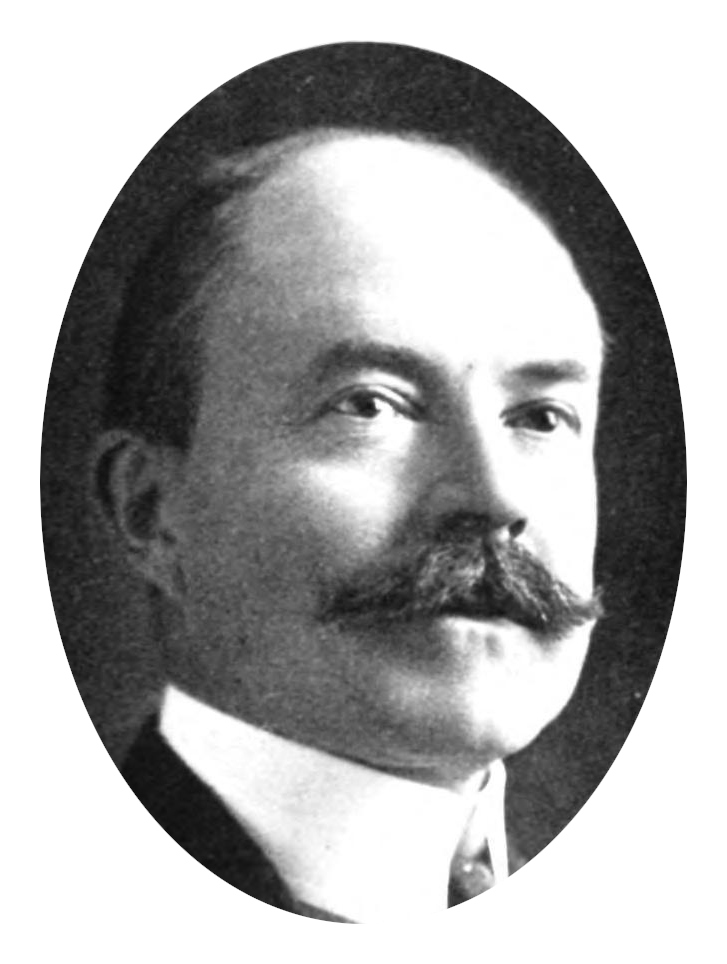
- Born: Charles Dennis Barney; July 9, 1844; Sandusky, Ohio
- Died: October 24, 1945 (aged 101); Elkins Park, Pennsylvania
- Education: University of Michigan
- Occupation: Stockbroker
- Spouse: Laura Elmina Cooke (m. 1868; died 1919)
- Children: 6
- Relatives: Charles Barney Harding (grandson); William Barclay Harding (grandson); Laura Barney Harding (granddaughter)

Signature
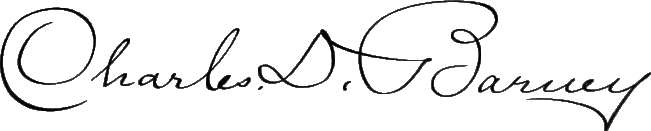

Charles Dennis Barney (July 9, 1844 – October 24, 1945) was an American stockbroker and founder of Charles D. Barney & Co., one of the predecessors of the brokerage and securities firm Smith Barney.

== Early life ==
Barney was born in Sandusky, Ohio, on July 9, 1844. He was the son of grain merchant Charles D. Barney (1812–1849) and Elizabeth Caldwell (née Dennis) Barney (1820–1908). His younger sisters were Sarah Amanda (née Barney) Kieffer, Helen Elizabeth Barney, and Susan Caldwell (née Barney) Butler. After his father died in 1849 during a cholera epidemic, his mother remarried to Rev. Moses Kieffer, a minister and the former president of Heidelberg College in Tiffin, Ohio.

His paternal grandparents were Throop Barney and Sarah Richmond (née Danforth) Barney. His maternal grandparents were Eben Jacob Dennis and Amanda Gilmore (née Caldwell) Dennis, members of an old New York family.

He attended the University of Michigan in Ann Arbor, Michigan, when the American Civil War broke out. Barney's older brother, Henry Caldwell Barney, was killed and at the end of 1862, Barney was permitted by his family to enlist in the Union Army, serving as part of Company B, 145th Regiment of the Ohio Volunteer Infantry at the rank of corporal. He helped man fortifications along the Potomac which protected Washington from the cavalry of Gen. Jubal Early.

== Career ==
Charles D. Barney & Co. logo c.1922

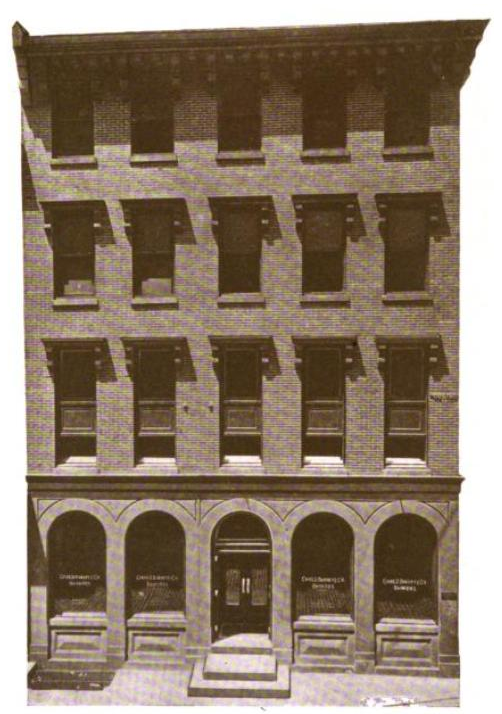
Offices of Charles D. Barney & Co. on Fourth Street (122-124) in Philadelphia, c. 1911

After the war, Barney worked briefly as a clerk at a bank in Sandusky. After two years, Barney moved to Philadelphia, where he married the daughter of prominent financier Jay Cooke, joining the firm of Jay Cooke & Company. Following the collapse of his father-in-law's Philadelphia banking house, in 1873, Barney reorganized the firm as Chas. D. Barney & Co. Barney's brother-in-law, Jay Cooke, Jr., joined the new firm as a minority partner.

Barney retired from day-to-day control of the firm in 1907, but remained involved through the 1930s. The business continued, under the same name, Henry E. Butler, J. Horace Harding (his son-in-law), Jay Cooke III, and Charles S. Phillips. In 1938, Charles D. Barney & Co. and Edward B. Smith & Co. merged to form Smith Barney & Co.

== Personal life ==
In 1868, Barney was married to Laura Elmina Cooke (1849–1919), the daughter of prominent Philadelphia financier Jay Cooke (who was also from Sandusky, Ohio and was a son of U.S. Representative Eleutheros Cooke) and Dorothea Elizabeth (née Allen) Cooke. Together, the Barneys were listed on the Social Register, and were the parents of six daughters, including:

- Dorothea Elizabeth Allen Barney (1871–1935), who married James Horace Harding, in 1898.
- Elizabeth Barney (1872–1953), who married John Hammann Whittaker.
- Catherine Cooke Barney (1873–1942), who married Joseph Shallgrass Bunting.
- Emily Bronaugh Barney (1876–1961), who married Johann Friedrich Hiller von Gaertringen, Baron von Hiller.
- Laura Barney (1878–1950), who married Henry Miller Watts, a son of diplomat Ethelbert Watts.
- Carlotta Doris Barney (1885–1954), who married Archibald Blair Hubard.

Barney was a director of the Union League of Philadelphia.

After reaching the age of 100 in 1944, (Note: In 1937, upon learning of the death of his friend, John D. Rockefeller at age 97, Barney challenged his physician, G. Harlan Wells, to "keep him alive longer than Mr. Rockefeller." Barney celebrated his 100th birthday by spending "the day with his six daughters and two trained nurses at his mansion, Eildon, in Elkins Park.") Barney died the following year on October 24, 1945, at the age of 101 at Eildon, his mansion in Elkins Park, Pennsylvania near Philadelphia. At the time of his death, Barney was among the oldest living veterans of the American Civil War.

=== Descendants ===
Through his daughter Dorothea, he was a grandfather of actress Laura Barney Harding, a close friend of Katharine Hepburn, and bankers William Barclay Harding (1907–1967) and Charles Barney Harding (1899–1979), who married Marion Choate (a daughter of Joseph H. Choate Jr. and granddaughter of Ambassador Joseph Hodges Choate and suffragist Caroline Dutcher Sterling Choate). Through his daughter Laura he was a great grandfather of inventor Nick DeWolf.

=== Residence ===
In 1878, Barney and his wife purchased an old farmhouse named "Eildon" at the northwest corner of Spring Avenue and Old York Road, on land that adjoined Ogontz, his father-in-law's estate in Elkins Park near Philadelphia. The farmhouse, which had previously been rented to Rachel Carr as Miss Carr's Ladies Seminary, had been owned by Frederick Fraley. Shortly after acquiring the home, however, it was destroyed by a fire.

In 1881, the Barneys built a Queen Anne-style mansion in its place, which was considered "one of the finest and most complete residences at Chelten Hills". The large stone mansion designed by Isaac Harding Hobbs and trimmed with brick. In 1947, two years after his death, the home was demolished and in 1956, the Elkins Park House apartments were built in its place.
