= George Cheyne Shattuck Choate =

American physician (1827–1896)

George Cheyne Shattuck Choate (March 30, 1827 – June 4, 1896) was an American physician and the founder of Choate House, a psychiatric sanatorium.

== Biography ==
He was born in Salem, Massachusetts, on March 30, 1827, to Margaret Manning (Hodges) and Dr. George Choate (first cousin of Rufus Choate, U.S. Senator from Massachusetts) and died on June 4, 1896. His siblings included William Gardner, founder the Choate School in Wallingford, Connecticut, Joseph Hodges Choate and Caroline von Gersdorff.

Choate graduated from Harvard College in 1846 and Harvard Medical School in 1849. He married Susan Osgood Kittredge (1830-1925).

Choate eventually moved to Westchester County, New York, where he established his own sanitarium. Choate added a wing to his house for use of his sanitarium to house patients being treated for mental and nervous disorders. One of Choate's most famous patients was politician and New-York Tribune founder Horace Greeley. Following his defeat for the presidency of the United States in 1872, Greeley checked into Choate’s sanitarium, where he died a few weeks later.

== Legacy ==
Choate died in 1896, but his sanitarium remained open for another decade. In 1909, Choate's widow had the wing her husband had constructed moved to its present location—just a stone's throw away from its former location—using horses, and at an inch at a time, it took about six months to move. Mrs. Choate lived there until her death, at age 95, in 1926. Today, Choate's sanitarium is now "Marks Hall", and his former residence is now known as "Choate House", both of which are located on the Pleasantville campus of Pace University.
