= Thomas J. King Jr. =

American academic

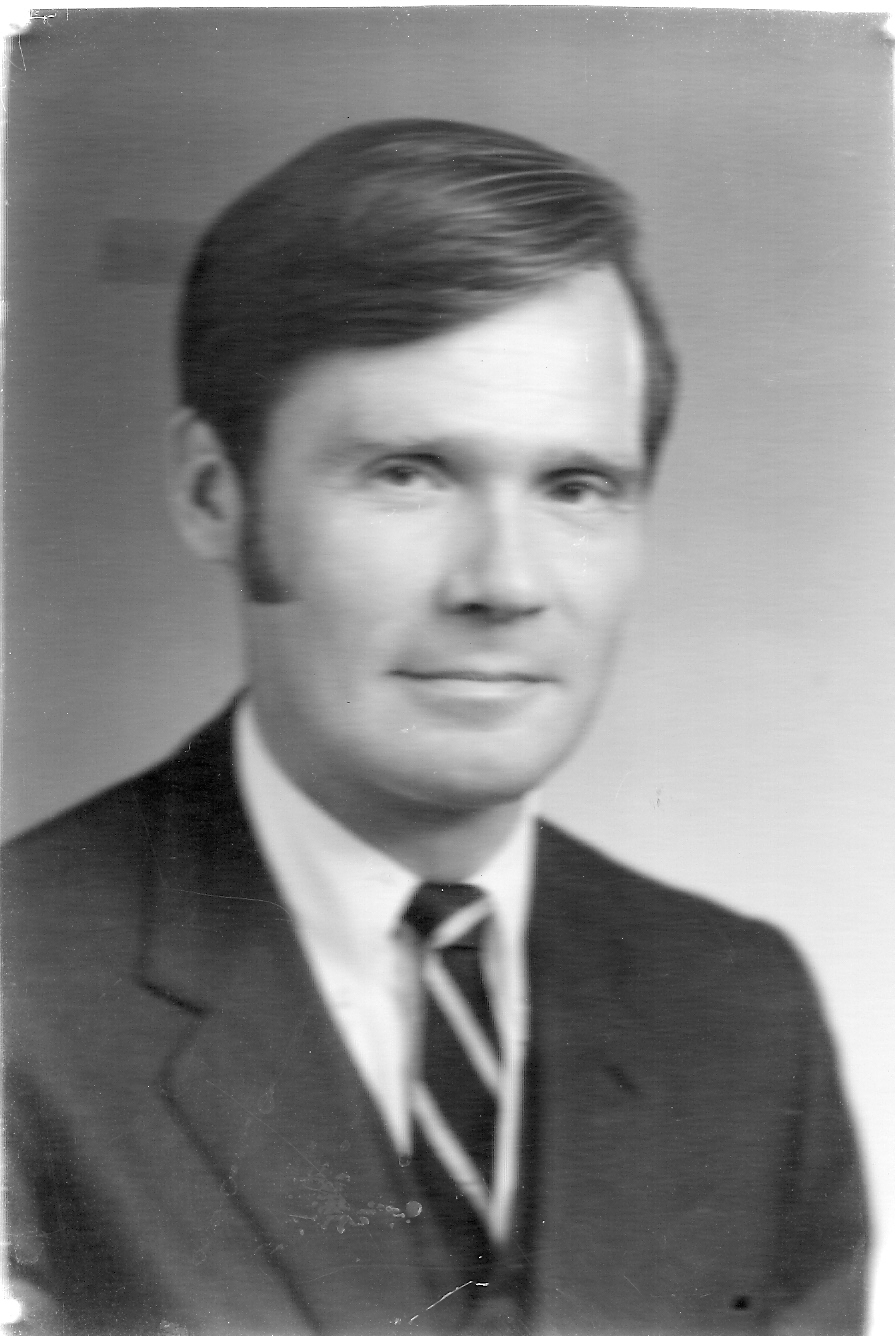
Thomas J. King Jr.

Professor Thomas J. King Jr. (July 25, 1925 – 1994) was an educator, and an early user of word processing and sequence analysis to compare available early versions of William Shakespeare's plays for identification of variant texts and their analysis. Dr. King's historical work also researched original prompt copies of Elizabethan Era and Jacobean Era plays contemporary to Shakespeare, along with their marginalia, in order to identify stage directions and infer physical staging of Shakespeare's plays at the Globe and other London venues, as well as at provincial halls and inns where Elizabethan troupes performed on tour. In his extensive studies, Prof. King created databases of every Shakespeare play and other extant Elizabethan contemporary playhouse documents, by scene and character, to determine number of lines, and therefore the roles that could be doubled with sufficient time between for costume change, thus enabling him to determine the size of a working Elizabethan theater company.

Based, in part, on his extensive experience in professional stage production, his academic studies combined textual analysis with analysis of original correspondence, illustrations, playhouse documents and financial records to identify principal actors and journeymen involved in performance of Shakespeare's plays and the plays of other Renaissance dramatists in England.

During his career, King contributed as writer and reviewer to a number of leading scholarly journals, including Theatre Notebook, Renaissance Drama, Shakespeare Quarterly, Elizabethan Theatre, and presented his work at World Shakespeare conferences.

He also served as consultant to Sam Wanamaker on the construction of the modern Shakespeare's Globe Theatre located near the original site in the London Borough of Southwark, on the south bank of the Thames.

== Biography ==
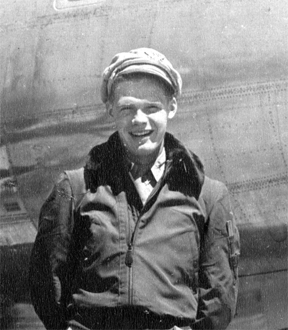
2nd Lt. Thomas J. King, 1945

Born, Philadelphia, July 25, 1925.

Graduated (aged 16) from Roosevelt High School, Yonkers, NY. Graduated from Princeton University, Class of 1946 in the year 1948, delayed due to war service 1943-1945 as combat air navigator in the Pacific (U.S. 20th Air Force: 6th Bomb Group ) Nineteen-year-old 2nd Lt. King was stationed on Tinian in the Marianas, navigating B-19s and B-29s across the Pacific on missions over Japan. He received several medals including the Army Air Corps Air Medal and the Distinguished Flying Cross.

Following studies at Princeton, T.J. King was the inventor of 'Matrix, the Strategy Game' an educational game (Patent 2971430) used to illustrate the fundamentals of game theory. (King left Princeton just before John Forbes Nash Jr. arrived as a graduate student; Nash's thesis was later to describe the Nash Equilibrium of optimal strategies in game theory)

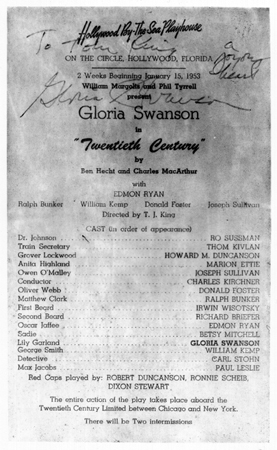
Program from touring production of Twentieth Century

King was president of the collegiate musical-comedy society, the Princeton Triangle Club, and later worked in legitimate theater (Broadway and summer stock productions) 1948-1956 as an actor, director and stage manager. Highlights include Assistant Stage Manager for the original Broadway production of Picnic by William Inge, and Stage Manager for Jose Ferrer's Broadway productions of The Shrike, Stalag 17, Cyrano de Bergerac and Othello at City Center. Summer Stock seasons included stage-managing at Westport Country Playhouse, and directing Gloria Swanson in On the Twentieth Century at Hollywood-by-the-Sea, FL. Prof King was a life member of Actors' Equity Association.

King entered graduate school at Columbia University in 1957, completed MA (1958) and PhD (1963) in English, serving at Columbia as Instructor (1961–65) and later as Visiting Assistant Professor in 1967-68.

He taught English literature and Renaissance Drama at Dartmouth College 1965-67, then joined faculty of the City College of New York of the City University of New York in 1968, where he retired as Professor of English in 1992.

Dr. King served as trustee of the New City Free Library and of the Rockland Country Day School and as Democratic Party Committee member near his home in Rockland County, New York.
