= William Gardner Choate =

American judge (1830-1920)

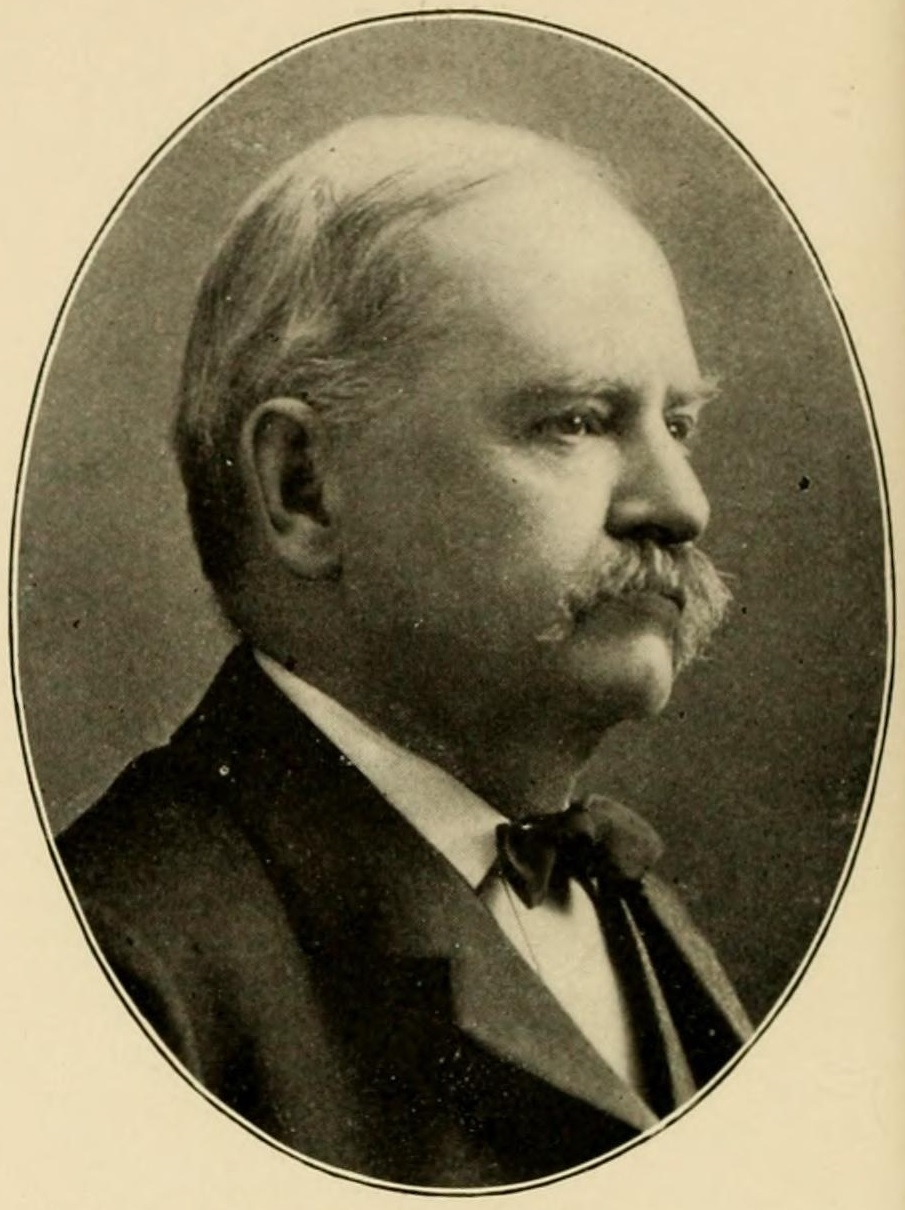

Judge of the United States District Court for the Southern District of New York
- In office March 25, 1878 – June 1, 1881
- Appointed by: Rutherford B. Hayes
- Preceded by: Samuel Blatchford
- Succeeded by: Addison Brown

Personal details
- Born: August 30, 1830 Salem, Massachusetts
- Died: November 14, 1920 (aged 90) Wallingford, Connecticut
- Education: Harvard University (AB, LLB)

William Gardner Choate (August 30, 1830 – November 14, 1920) was a United States district judge of the United States District Court for the Southern District of New York. He also cofounded the Choate Rosemary Hall college, a private boarding school in Wallingford, Connecticut.

== Education and career ==
Choate was born in Salem, Massachusetts, the son of George and Margaret Manning (Hodges) Choate. His brothers were physician George Cheyne Shattuck Choate and diplomat and lawyer Joseph Hodges Choate. Choate received an Artium Baccalaureus degree from Harvard University in 1852 and a Bachelor of Laws from Harvard Law School in 1854. He was in private practice in Danvers, Massachusetts from 1855 to 1857, then in Salem until 1865, and then in New York City from 1865 to 1878.

== Federal judicial service ==
On March 14, 1878, Choate was nominated by President Rutherford B. Hayes to a seat on the United States District Court for the Southern District of New York vacated by Judge Samuel Blatchford. Choate was confirmed by the United States Senate on March 25, 1878, and received his commission the same day. Choate served on the court for only three years, resigning on June 1, 1881.

== Later career and death ==
Following his resignation from the federal bench, Choate resumed private practice in New York City from 1881 to 1920. With his wife, Mary Atwater Choate, he founded the girls school, Rosemary Hall, in 1890, and the Choate School, a boys school, in 1896, both in Wallingford, Connecticut (now combined as Choate Rosemary Hall).

His wife Mary was the niece of Senator Edgar Atwater and Sarah S. Yale, member of the family of Senator Charles Atwater and the Yale family of Yale University. Sarah's cousin was Senator Charles Dwight Yale and her uncle was merchant William Yale.

William Gardner Choate died on November 14, 1920, in Wallingford.

== Sources ==
Legal offices
Preceded by Samuel Blatchford	Judge of the United States District Court for the Southern District of New York; 1878–1881	Succeeded by Addison Brown
