= Federal Alcohol Administration =

Former United States government agency

The Federal Alcohol Administration was a United States government agency created in 1935 (as part of the Department of the Treasury) by the Federal Alcohol Administration Act, title 27 chapter 8 of the United States Code. It was created to regulate the alcohol industry after the repeal of Prohibition, replacing a previous body (the Federal Alcohol Control Administration) which did not have statutory powers. The Act still partly continues in force, underpinning the powers of the Alcohol and Tobacco Tax and Trade Bureau (TTB).

== See also ==
- Bureau of Alcohol, Tobacco, Firearms, and Explosives (ATF)
- Joseph H. Choate Jr., head of the preceding Federal Alcohol Control Administration
