= Joseph Hodges Choate =

United States lawyer and diplomat

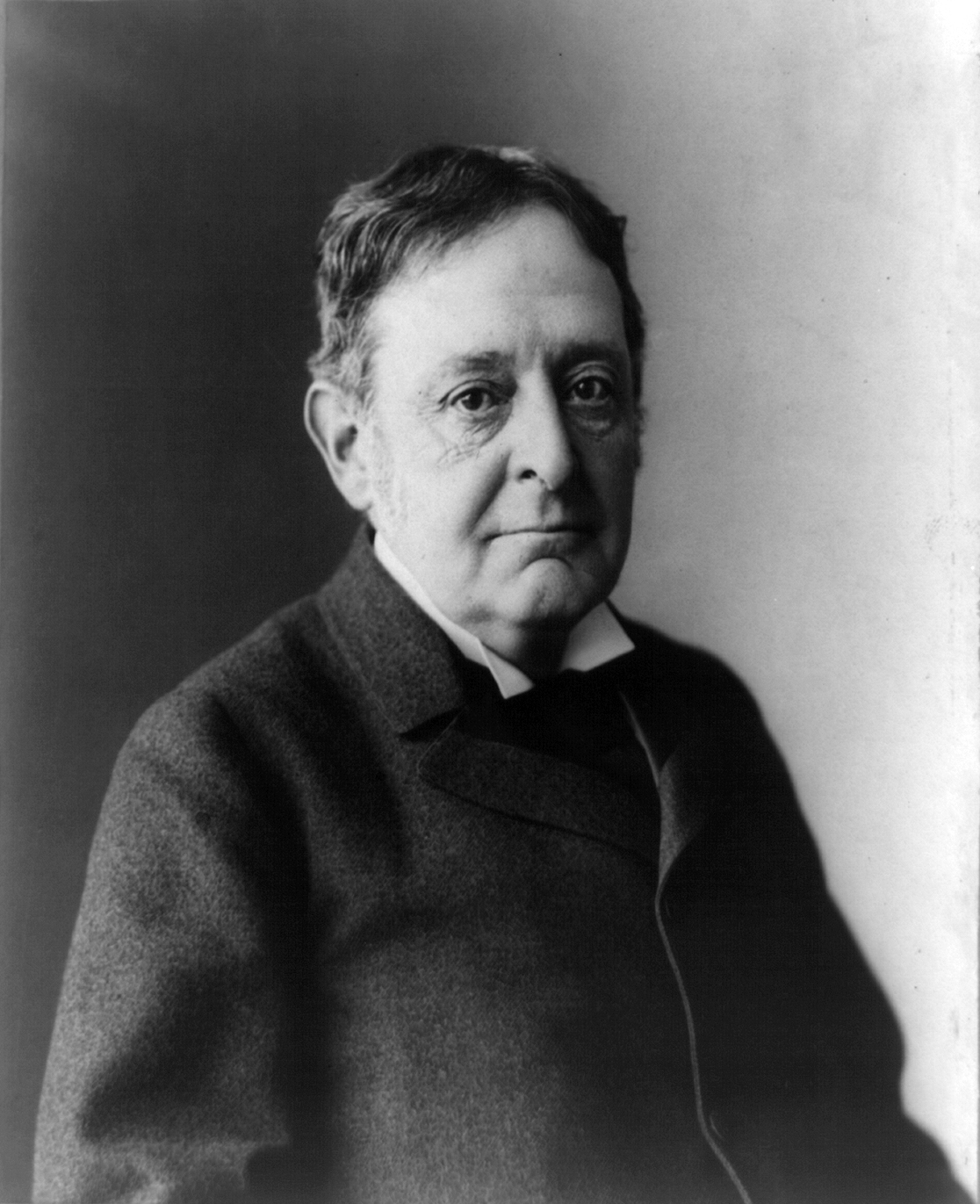
- Joseph Hodges Choate, 1898

United States Ambassador to the United Kingdom
- In office March 6, 1899 – May 23, 1905
- Monarchs: Victoria; Edward VII
- President: William McKinley; Theodore Roosevelt
- Prime Minister: The Marquess of Salisbury; Arthur Balfour
- Preceded by: John Hay
- Succeeded by: Whitelaw Reid

Personal details
- Born: January 24, 1832 Salem, Massachusetts
- Died: May 14, 1917 (aged 85) Manhattan, New York City
- Resting place: Stockbridge Cemetery, Stockbridge, Berkshire Co., Massachusetts
- Spouse: Caroline Dutcher Sterling (m. 1861)
- Relatives: Mabel Choate (daughter); Joseph H. Choate Jr. (son); George C. S. Choate (brother); William Gardner Choate (brother); Rufus Choate (cousin)
- Education: Harvard College; Harvard Law School
- Profession: Politician, Diplomat
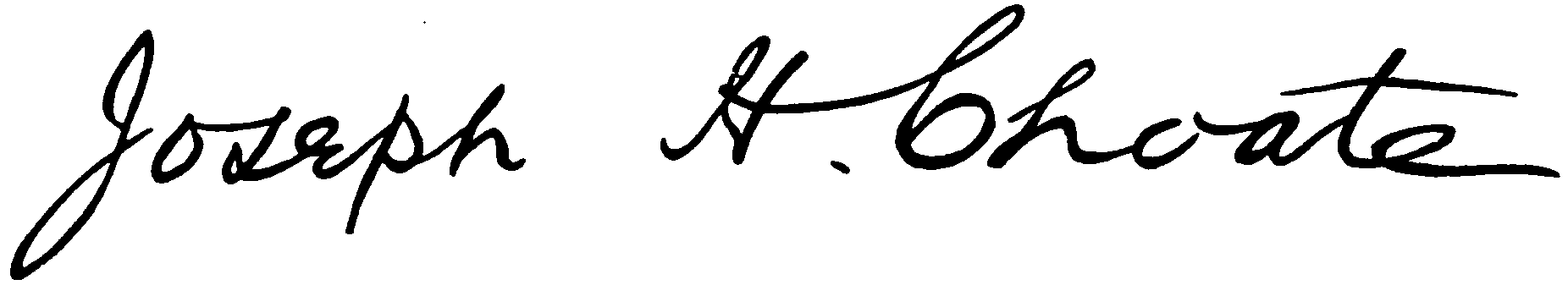
- Signature

Joseph Hodges Choate (January 24, 1832 – May 14, 1917) was an American lawyer and diplomat. He was chairman of the American delegation at the Second Hague Conference, and ambassador to the United Kingdom.

Choate was associated with many of the most famous litigations in American legal history, including the Kansas prohibition cases, the Chinese exclusion cases, the Isaac H. Maynard election returns case, the Income Tax Suit, and the Samuel J. Tilden, Jane Stanford, and Alexander Turney Stewart will cases. In the public sphere, he was influential in the founding of the Metropolitan Museum of Art.

== Early life ==
Choate was born in Salem, Massachusetts, on January 24, 1832. He was the son of Margaret Manning (née Hodges) Choate and physician George Choate. Among his siblings were William Gardner Choate, a United States district judge of the United States District Court for the Southern District of New York, Dr. George Cheyne Shattuck Choate, and a sister, Caroline Choate (von Gersdorff).

His father's first cousin (his first cousin once removed) was Rufus Choate, a U.S. Representative and U.S. Senator from Massachusetts. His paternal grandparents were George Choate and Susanna Choate, and his maternal grandparents were Gamaliel Hodges and Sarah (née Williams) Hodges.

Choate graduated from Harvard College in 1852 and Harvard Law School in 1854.

== Career ==
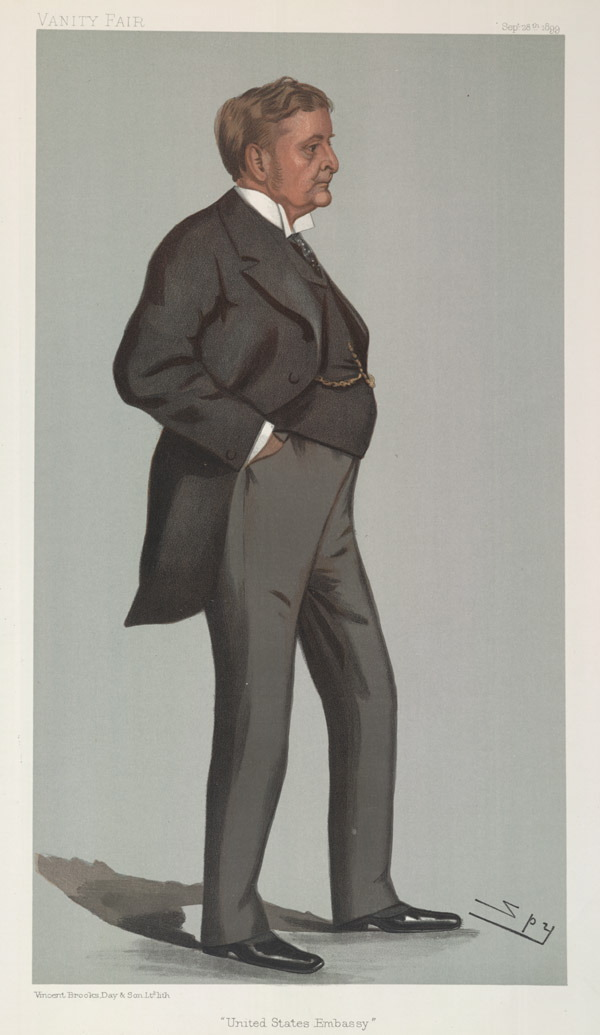
"United States Embassy". Caricature by Spy published in Vanity Fair in 1899.

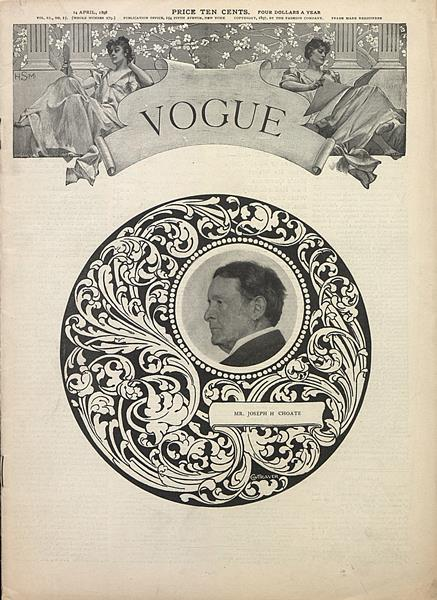
Choate featured on the 14 Apr 1898 cover of Vogue

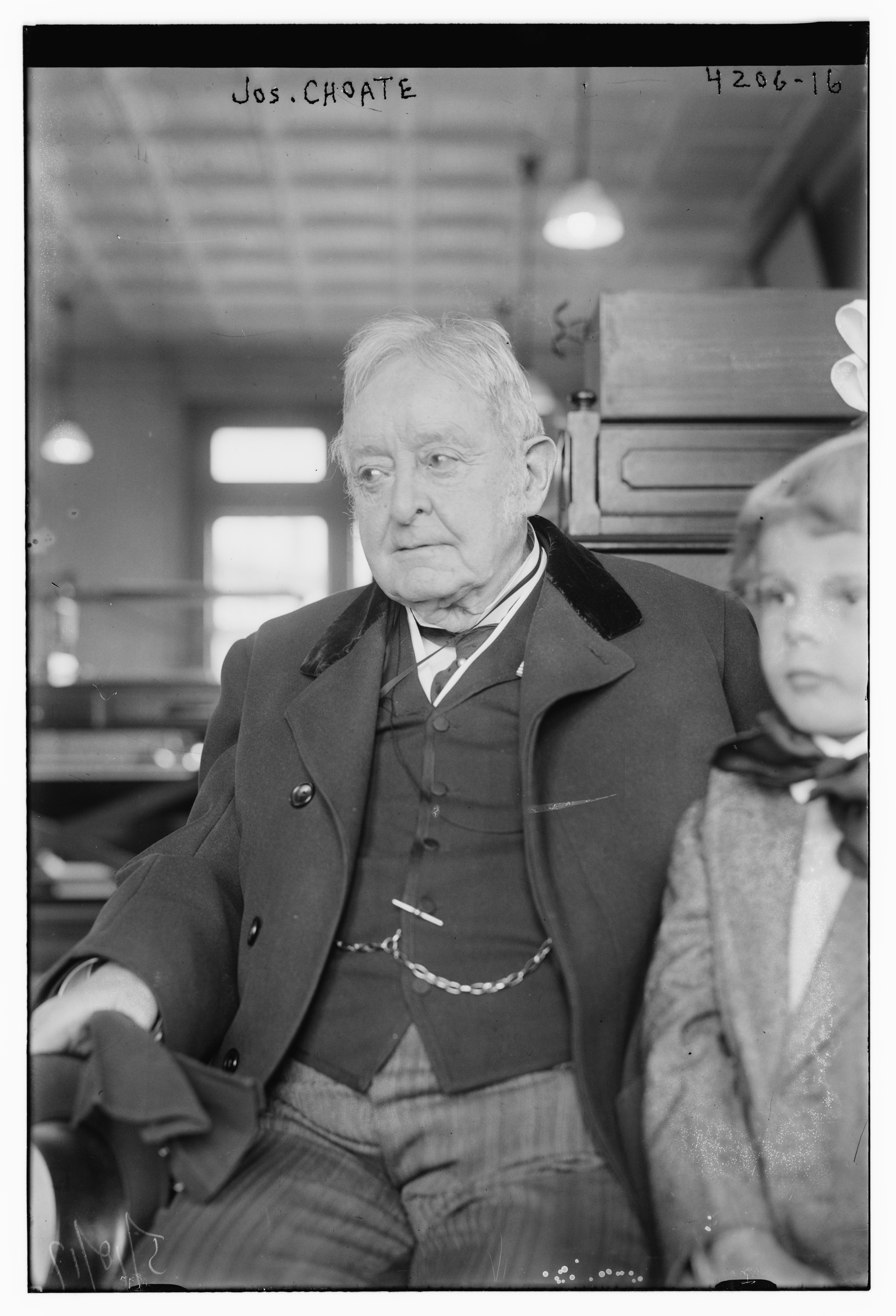
Joseph Hodges Choate on May 11, 1917, in Manhattan

After graduation from law school, Choate was admitted first to the Massachusetts in 1855, followed by admission to the New York bar in 1856, after which he entered the law office of Scudder & Carter in New York City.

His success in his profession was immediate, and in 1860 he became junior partner in the firm of Evarts, Southmayd & Choate, the senior partner in which was William M. Evarts. This firm and its successor, that of Evarts, Choate & Beaman, remained for many years among the leading law firms of New York and of the country, the activities of both being national rather than local.

During these busy years, Choate was associated with many of the most famous legal cases in American legal history, including the Tilden, Alexander Turney Stewart, and Jane Stanford will cases, the Kansas prohibition cases, the Chinese exclusion cases (in which he argued against the law's validity), the Isaac H. Maynard election returns case, and the Income Tax Suit. In 1871, he became a member of the Committee of Seventy in New York City, which was instrumental in breaking up the Tweed Ring, and later assisted in the prosecution of the indicted officials. He served as president of the American Bar Association, the New York State Bar Association, and the New York City Bar Association. In the retrial of the General Fitz-John Porter case, he obtained a reversal of the decision of the original court-martial.

His greatest reputation was won perhaps in cross-examination. In politics, he allied himself with the Republican Party on its organization, being a frequent speaker in presidential campaigns, beginning with that of 1856. He never held political office, although he was a candidate for the Republican U.S. senatorial nomination for New York against Senator Thomas C. Platt in 1897. During this time he was a "true believer" in the cause of Cuban independence, being heavily informed and swayed by Cuban exiles in New York City, including Tomás Estrada Palma. In 1894, he was president of the New York state constitutional convention.

=== U.S. Ambassador to the United Kingdom ===
He was appointed, by President McKinley, U.S. Ambassador to the United Kingdom to succeed John Hay in 1899, and remained in this position after Theodore Roosevelt's ascendancy to the presidency until the spring of 1905. In England, he won great personal popularity, and accomplished much in fostering the good relations of the two great English-speaking powers. He represented the president at the funeral of Queen Victoria. He was one of the representatives of the United States at the Second Hague Peace Conference in 1907.

=== Later life ===
Upon the outbreak of the World War I, he ardently supported the cause of the Allies. He severely criticized President Wilson's hesitation to recommend America's immediate cooperation, but shortly before his death retracted his criticism. He was chairman of the mayor's committee in New York for entertaining the British and French commissions in 1917. His death was hastened by the physical strain of his constant activities in this connection.

== Personal life ==
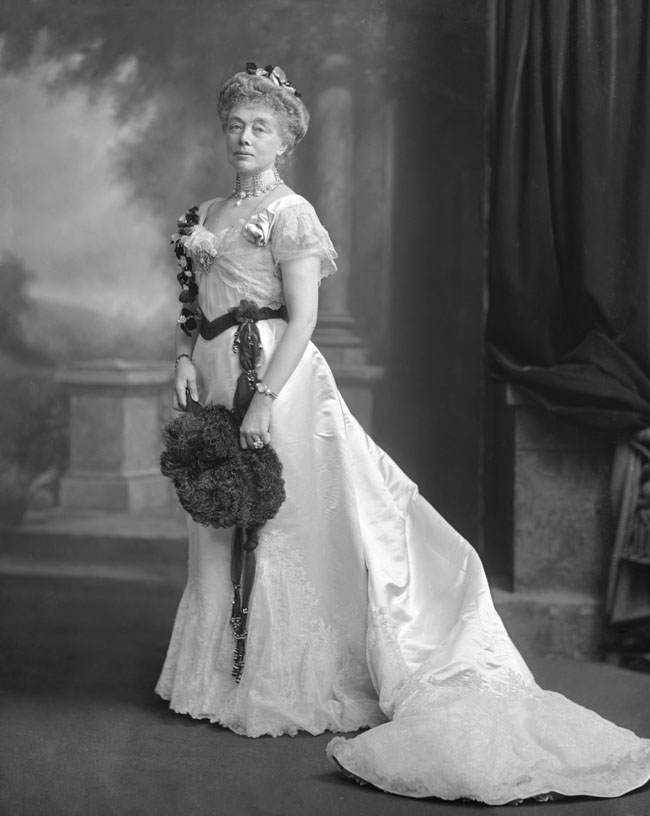
Photograph of Caroline Sterling Choate, May 13, 1902.

On October 16, 1861, he married Caroline Dutcher Sterling Choate (1837–1929), who had been born in Salisbury, Connecticut. She was the daughter of Caroline Mary (née Dutcher) Sterling and Frederick Augustine Sterling and a distant relative of Frederick A. Sterling. Caroline was an artist and an advocate for women's education, helping to establish both Brearley School and Barnard College.

Joseph and Caroline were the parents of five children, two of whom predeceased their parents:

- Ruluff Sterling Choate (September 24, 1864 – April 5, 1884)
- George Choate (born January 28, 1867 – 1937)
- Josephine Choate (January 9, 1869 – July 20, 1896)
- Mabel Choate (December 26, 1870 – 1958), who did not marry and became a gardener and philanthropist.
- Joseph Hodges Choate Jr. (February 2, 1876 – 1968), who married Cora Lyman Oliver, daughter of General Robert Shaw Oliver, in 1903.

The family owned a large country house, known as Naumkeag, which was designed by Stanford White and is today open to the public as a nonprofit museum, run by the trustees of the Reservation, in Stockbridge, Massachusetts. It was donated to the organization by his daughter, Mabel.

Choate died on May 14, 1917, at his residence, 8 East 63rd Street in Manhattan. His funeral was held on May 17 at St. Bartholomew's Church in New York, where it was attended by the British Ambassador, Sir Cecil Spring-Rice, the French Minister of Education, M. Hovelacque, and the Assistant Secretary of State, William Phillips, among many others. He was buried in the Stockbridge Cemetery in Stockbridge, Massachusetts. Memorial services were held on May 22 in London, England, and on May 31 at Trinity Church on Wall Street.

=== Descendants ===
Through his granddaughter, Helen Choate Platt (1906–1974), he is the great-grandfather of diplomat Nicholas Platt (b. 1936), the former U.S. Ambassador to Zambia, the Philippines, and Pakistan; and the great-great-grandfather of actor Oliver Platt (b. 1960).

=== Honors and legacy ===
He was awarded an honorary doctorate (LL.D.) by the University of Edinburgh in April 1900; another LL.D. from Yale University in October 1901, during celebrations for the bicentenary of the university; an honorary doctorate (D.C.L.) by the University of Oxford in June 1902; and an honorary degree by the University of St Andrews in October 1902. He was an elected member of both the American Academy of Arts and Sciences and the American Philosophical Society.

Elihu Root, Theodore Roosevelt, and Francis Lynde Stetson delivered memorial addresses on January 19, 1918 before the Century Association, where Choate had been a member since 1858 and served as president 1911–1917. James Bryce and Charles W. Eliot sent letters and Arthur Balfour sent a cable message for the occasion.

In 1919, two years after his death, members of the Harvard Club of New York City established the Joseph Hodges Choate Memorial Fellowship at Harvard University to commemorate his life and legacy. It is awarded each year to a student from the University of Cambridge on the recommendation of the Cambridge Vice-Chancellor for study in any Department of Harvard University.

== Published works ==
- Choate, Joseph Hodges (1900). Abraham Lincoln. Address delivered before the Edinburgh Philosophical Institution. November 13th, 1900. London: Harrison & Sons.
- The Choate story book; with a biographical sketch of J. H. Choate. New York: Cameron. 1903.
- Choate, Joseph Hodges (1910). Abraham Lincoln and Other Addresses in England. New York: The Century Co.
- Choate, Joseph Hodges (1911). American addresses. New York: The Century Co. ISBN 9780836914009.
- Choate, Joseph Hodges; Choate, Caroline Sterling (1917). The boyhood and youth of Joseph Hodges Choate. New York: Scribner Press.
- Choate, Joseph Hodges (1920). The life of Joseph Hodges Choate as gathered chiefly from his letters. New York: C. Scribner's sons.

Diplomatic posts
Preceded by John Hay	U.S. Ambassador to the United Kingdom; 1899–1905	Succeeded by Whitelaw Reid
