= Jay Cooke & Company =

U.S. bank from 1861 to 1873

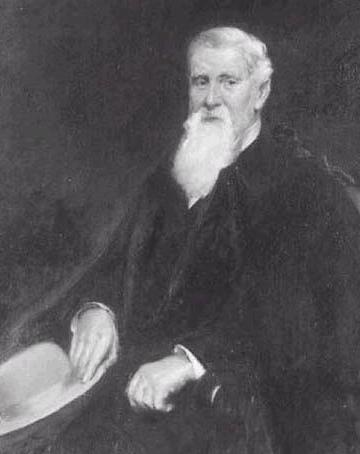
Jay Cooke, founder of the bank

Jay Cooke & Company was a U.S. bank that operated from 1861 to 1873. Headquartered in Philadelphia, Pennsylvania, with branches in New York City and Washington, D.C., the bank helped underwrite the Union Civil War effort. It was the first "wire" brokerage house, pioneering the use of telegraph messages to confirm securities transactions with clients. The bank became overextended in the building of the Northern Pacific Railway and failed, contributing to the Panic of 1873.

== History ==
=== Early years ===
Jay Cooke founded the bank in 1861 with William E. C. Moorhead, the ownership split two-thirds to one-third. Later partners included Cooke's brothers, Henry and Pitt, then H. C. Fahnestock and Edward Dodge, who held the bank's seat on the New York Stock Exchange after 1870.

During the Civil War, Cooke & Company sold hundreds of millions of dollars in Union government bonds. Its reputation among investors around the world enabled the bank to sell these bonds when other brokerages could not. Secretary of the Treasury Salmon Chase asked Cooke to try to sell the government's new $500 million issue of 5–20 bonds. These paid six percent interest (in gold) and matured in 20 years, but were callable in five years. Cooke used numerous agents from a variety of professions—small bankers, insurance agents, and real estate professionals—to sell these bonds to support the Union war effort. Cooke & Company's innovative use of the telegraph to confirm sales allowed selling throughout the country to be coordinated in Philadelphia.

=== After the war ===
After the war, Cooke & Company continued to fund its investments through the sale of US treasuries. After the Black Friday scare, however, it became apparent that Cooke & Company would have to find other sources of capital. The firm turned to investing in railroads. In 1870, the Northern Pacific Railroad made Cooke & Company its exclusive bond agent. But Cooke had difficulty marketing the bonds to investors, wound up owning 75 percent of the company, and overextended his bank. As this liability became public, investors began withdrawing money from Cooke & Company.

Cooke & Company wrote liabilities against expected returns from the sale of its Northern Pacific Railroad bonds, but ultimately could not sell enough bonds to meet its obligations. A run on the bank ensued, and its operations were suspended. When the New York Stock Exchange heard the announcement, equities plummeted, causing a chain reaction of bank runs and failures throughout the United States that signaled the arrival of the Panic of 1873 to American shores.

Bankruptcy commenced soon after the collapse. Many of the junior partners at Cooke did not suffer when the bank collapsed because they anticipated the failure and had divested from assets that would crumble if Cooke became insolvent. The government seized most of Cooke's larger estates while Cooke moved to one of his smaller properties. Many of Cooke's allies in the banking business soon collapsed, including Livermore, Clews & Co. and Fisk & Hatch.

In 1880, a former executive of Jay Cooke refused to testify before Congress and was found in contempt and detained. The U.S. Supreme Court declined to release him in Kilbourn v. Thompson.
