= Morgan Stanley Wealth Management =

American multinational financial services corporation specialses in retail brokrage

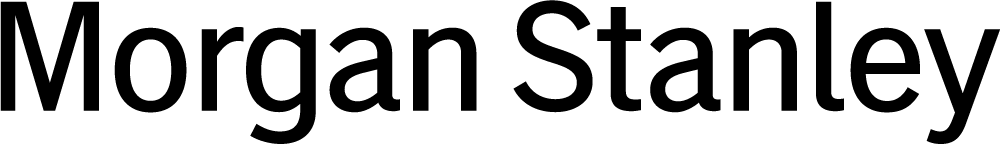
- Type: Private
- Industry: Financial services
- Founded: 2009; 17 years ago
- Founder: Henry S. Morgan; Harold Stanley; Charles D. Barney; Edward B. Smith
- Headquarters: Purchase, New York, U.S.
- Area served: Worldwide
- Key people: Jed Finn (CEO)
- Products: Wealth management
- Revenue: US$31.800 billion (2025)
- Net income: US$9.065 billion (2025)
- AUM: US$2.00 trillion (2026)
- Number of employees: 10,000 (2026)
- Parent: Morgan Stanley
- Website: www.morganstanleyindividual.com

Morgan Stanley Wealth Management is an American multinational wealth management firm headquartered in Purchase, New York. It serves as the wealth management unit of Morgan Stanley and is distinct to its asset management unit, Morgan Stanley Investment Management. Clients range from individual investors to small- and mid-sized businesses, as well as large corporations, non-profit organizations and family foundations. It is one of the largest wealth management firms in the world, with $2 trillion in client assets as of 2026.

Founded in 2009, the wealth management unit traces its roots to the joint merger of Smith Barney between Citigroup and Morgan Stanley. The firm was fully integrated by 2012, carrying its former name as its broker-dealer designation thereafter. The unit was expanded further following Morgan Stanley's $13 billion acquisition of E-Trade in 2020.

== History ==
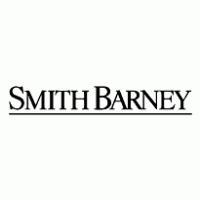
Smith Barney & Co. logo

Smith Barney & Co. was formed in 1938 through the merger of Charles D. Barney & Co. and Edward B. Smith & Co. Charles D. Barney & Co., a New York and Philadelphia based firm, was founded by Charles D. Barney in 1873 following the failure of its predecessor Jay Cooke & Company. Edward B. Smith & Co., founded in 1892 became a significant player in securities underwriting in 1934 when the firm absorbed the professionals from the securities business of Guaranty Trust Company, following the passage of the Glass–Steagall Act.

In 1975, Smith Barney merged with Harris, Upham & Co. to form Smith Barney, Harris Upham & Co., which, in 1977, was placed under SBHU Holdings, a holding company. In 1982, SBHU Holdings was renamed Smith Barney Inc. During the 1980s, the company was known for its television commercials featuring actor John Houseman, with the catchphrase, "They make money the old-fashioned way. They earn it." After Houseman stepped down, the campaign continued with various actors, such as Leo McKern, Joel Higgins and George C. Scott.

Smith Barney Shearson logo following the purchase of the brokerage business of Shearson Lehman Hutton from American Express

In the late 1980s, the retail brokerage firm Smith Barney was owned by Sanford I. Weill's Primerica Corporation. Commercial Credit purchased Primerica in 1988, for $1.5 billion ($4,083,427,124 today). In 1992, they paid $722 million ($1,656,473,797 today) to buy a 27% share of Travelers Insurance and in 1993 acquired Shearson (which included the legacy business of E.F. Hutton) from American Express. By the end of 1993, the merged company was known as Travelers Group Inc. although the brokerage business continued to operate under the Smith Barney brand.

In 1993, Weill bought stockbroker Shearson back from American Express for $1 billion ($2,228,749,136 today), and merged it into Smith Barney. (Weill had been in charge of Shearson Loeb Rhoades and sold it to American Express in 1981.) Weill offered Joe Plumeri the presidency of Smith Barney, and he became the President of the merged company that year. He only lasted a year, as he experienced conflicts with existing Smith Barney managers.

In September 1997, Travelers acquired Salomon Inc. (parent company of Salomon Brothers Inc.), for over $9 billion ($18,050,373,134 today) in stock, and merged it with its own investment arm to create Salomon Smith Barney. In April 1998 Travelers Group announced an agreement to undertake a $76 billion ($150,122,498,979 today) merger between Travelers and Citicorp, creating Citigroup, which at the time of the merger was the largest single financial services company in the world.

At the time of the September 11, 2001, attacks, it was the largest tenant in 7 World Trade Center, occupying 1,202,900 sq ft (111,750 m^{2}) (64 percent of the building) which included floors 28–45.

=== Sale to Morgan Stanley ===
During the 2008 financial crisis, Citigroup suffered large losses in its retained collateralized debt obligation exposure (loans that Citi underwrote but was not able to sell), and had to be rescued by the U.S. federal government. They decided to sell or close "non-core" businesses in order to raise money. On January 13, 2009, Morgan Stanley and Citigroup announced the merger of Smith Barney with Morgan Stanley's Global Wealth Management Group, with Morgan Stanley paying $2.7 billion cash upfront to Citigroup for a 51% stake in the joint venture. The joint venture operates as Morgan Stanley Smith Barney. Morgan Stanley itself was in a financially cash-strapped position like Citigroup during that time, but they were helped by the $9 billion that Mitsubishi UFJ Financial Group had paid in 2008 for a 21% stake in Morgan Stanley.

On June 1, 2009, Morgan Stanley and Citigroup announced they closed early on the launch of their joint venture that combines Morgan Stanley's wealth management unit (including many former Dean Witter assets) with Citi's Smith Barney brokerage division. The new venture, called Morgan Stanley Smith Barney, was supposed to launch during the third quarter. The combined entity generates about $14 billion in net revenue, has 18,500 financial advisors, 1,000 locations worldwide and serves about 6.8 million households.

Citigroup disclosed on September 17, 2009, they would sell their remaining shares in the group to partner Morgan Stanley. The unit was expanded following Morgan Stanley's $13 billion acquisition of E-Trade in 2020.

== Acquisition history ==
The following is an illustration of the company's major mergers and acquisitions and historical predecessors (this is not a comprehensive list):

Acquisition history

- Morgan Stanley Smith Barney (merged 2009)
  - Morgan Stanley (merged 1997, formerly Morgan Stanley Dean Witter)
    - Morgan Stanley
      (est. 1935)
    - Dean Witter Reynolds (merged 1978)
      - Dean Witter
        (est. 1924)
      - Reynolds Securities
        (est. 1931)
  - Smith Barney Shearson (merged 1993)
    - Smith Barney, Harris Upham & Co. (acq. 1985)
      - Primerica Corporation
        (later acq. by Commercial Credit)
      - Smith Barney & Co. (merged 1938)
        - Edward B. Smith & Co.
          (est. 1892)
        - Charles D. Barney & Co.
          (est. 1873)
      - Harris, Upham & Co.
        (est. 1929, acq. 1975)
    - Shearson Lehman Hutton (merged 1988)
      - Shearson Lehman Brothers (merged 1984)
        - Shearson/American Express (merged 1981)
          - American Express
            (est. 1850)
          - Shearson Loeb Rhoades (acquired 1981)
            - Shearson Hayden Stone (merged 1973)
              - Hayden Stone, Inc. (formerly CBWL-Hayden Stone, merged 1970)
                - Cogan, Berlind, Weill & Levitt
                  (formerly Carter, Berlind, Potoma & Weill, est. 1960)
                - Hayden, Stone & Co.
              - Shearson, Hammill & Co.
                (est. 1902)
            - Loeb, Rhoades, Hornblower & Co. (merged 1978)
              - Loeb, Rhoades & Co. (merged 1937)
                - Carl M. Loeb & Co.
                  (est. 1931)
                - Rhoades & Company
                  (est. 1905)
              - Hornblower, Weeks, Noyes & Trask (merged 1953–1977)
                - Hornblower & Weeks
                  (est. 1888)
                - Hemphill, Noyes & Co.
                  (est. 1919, acq. 1963)
                - Spencer Trask & Co.
                  (est. 1866 as Trask & Brown)
                - Paul H. Davis & Co.
                  (est. 1920, acq. 1953)
          - Robinson Humphrey Co. (acq. 1982)
          - Foster & Marshall (acq. 1982)
          - Balcor Co. (acq. 1982)
          - Chiles, Heider & Co. (acq. 1983)
          - Davis, Skaggs & Co. (acq. 1983)
          - Columbia Group (acq. 1984)
          - Financo (founded 1971, acq. 1985)
          - L. Messel & Co. (acq. 1986)
        - Lehman Brothers Kuhn Loeb (merged 1977)
          - Lehman Brothers
            (est. 1850)
          - Kuhn, Loeb & Co.
            (est. 1867)
          - Abraham & Co.
            (est. 1938, acq. 1975)
      - E. F. Hutton & Co.
        (est. 1904)
