= Stockbridge Casino =

- U.S. National Register of Historic Places
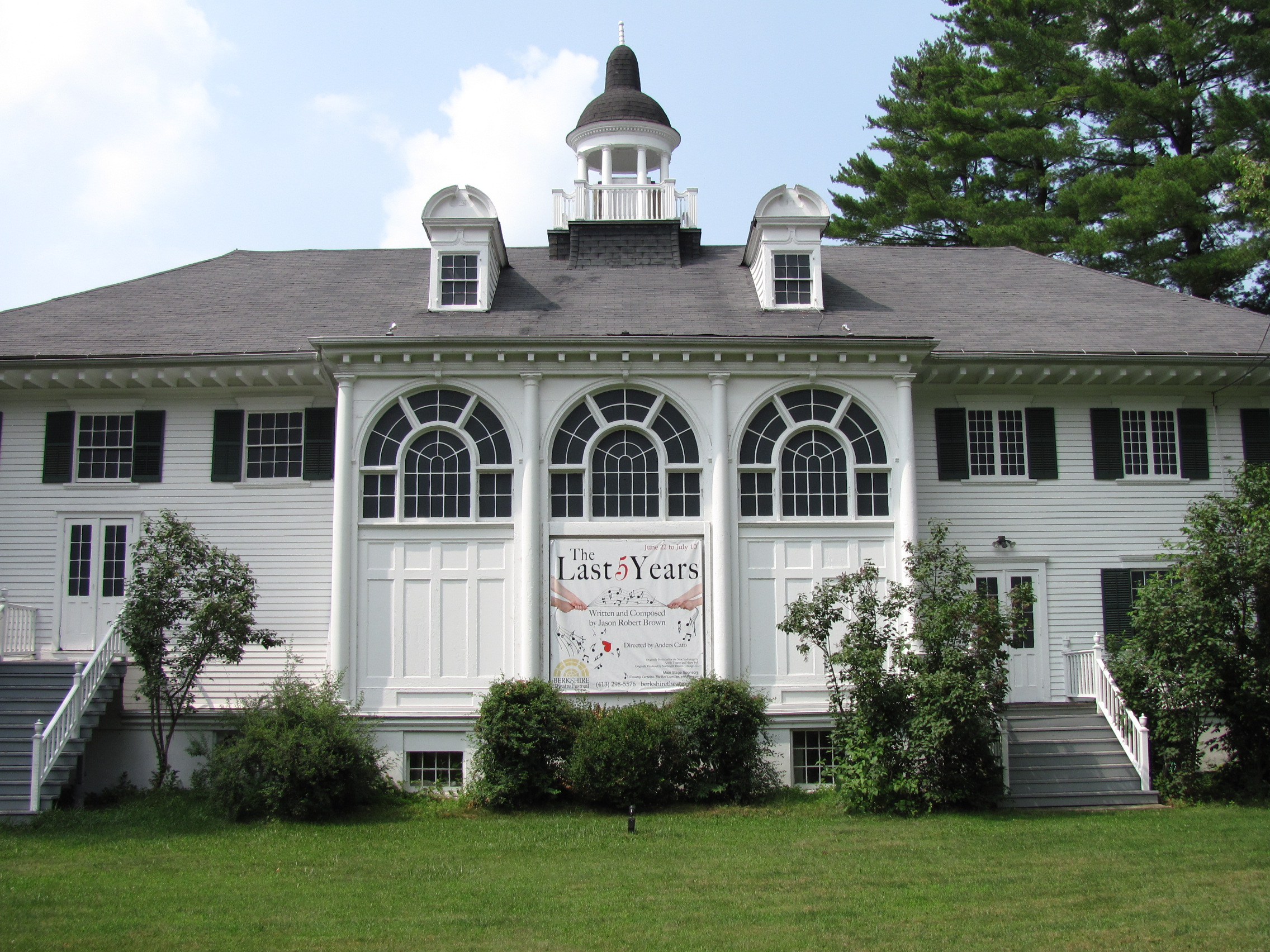
- Stockbridge Casino

- Location within Massachusetts Location within the United States
- Location: 1 Yale Hill Rd., Stockbridge, Massachusetts
- Coordinates: 42°16′56″N 73°18′6″W
- Area: 1.5 acres (0.61 ha)
- Built: 1887
- Architect: McKim, Mead & White
- Architectural style: Queen Anne
- NRHP reference No.: 76000249
- Added to NRHP: August 27, 1976

The Stockbridge Casino is a historic building at the junction of East Main Street and Yale Hill Road in Stockbridge, Massachusetts. Built in 1887, it is a prominent local work of architect Stanford White, and has served as a cultural center in the community since its construction, despite being moved in 1928. Now a part of the grounds of the Berkshire Theatre Festival, the building was added to the National Register of Historic Places in 1976.

== Description and history ==
The former Stockbridge Casino is set east of Stockbridge's Main Street downtown, at the northwest corner of Yale Hill Road and East Main Street. It is a two-story wood-frame structure, with a hip roof and clapboarded exterior. The roof is capped by a cupola, mounted in eight small round columns which are surrounded by a low balustrade. On the front roof face, the cupola flanked by round-headed dormers. The main facade has a projecting two-story center section, composed of three bays articulated by engaged round columns. Each of these bays has a paneled first floor and a rounded window on the second. Entrances are located flanking this projecting bay, accessed via stairs at differing elevations. The interior has undergone some alterations from its original appearance, due to its conversion to a theatrical performance space.

Designed by Stanford White, the casino was built in 1887 near the western end of Main Street at the base of Prospect Hill, and for many years was a popular recreational and social attraction (according to older usages of the word "casino", it was not necessarily a gambling establishment). After falling into decline, the property was purchased in 1927 by Mabel Choate, owner of the nearby Naumkeag estate. She sought the property as a location for the Mission House, and was not interested in the casino building. She sold it for $1 to businessman and artist Walter Leighton Clark on the condition that it be moved. Together with sculptor Daniel Chester French and Dr. Austen Fox Riggs, he founded the Three Arts Society, which purchased the building and moved it to its current location. The building was renovated and reopened in 1928 as the Berkshire Playhouse, which later became the Berkshire Theatre Festival.

== See also ==
- National Register of Historic Places listings in Berkshire County, Massachusetts
- Theater of the United States
