= Main Street Historic District (Stockbridge, Massachusetts) =

Historic district in Massachusetts, United States

- U.S. National Register of Historic Places
- U.S. Historic district
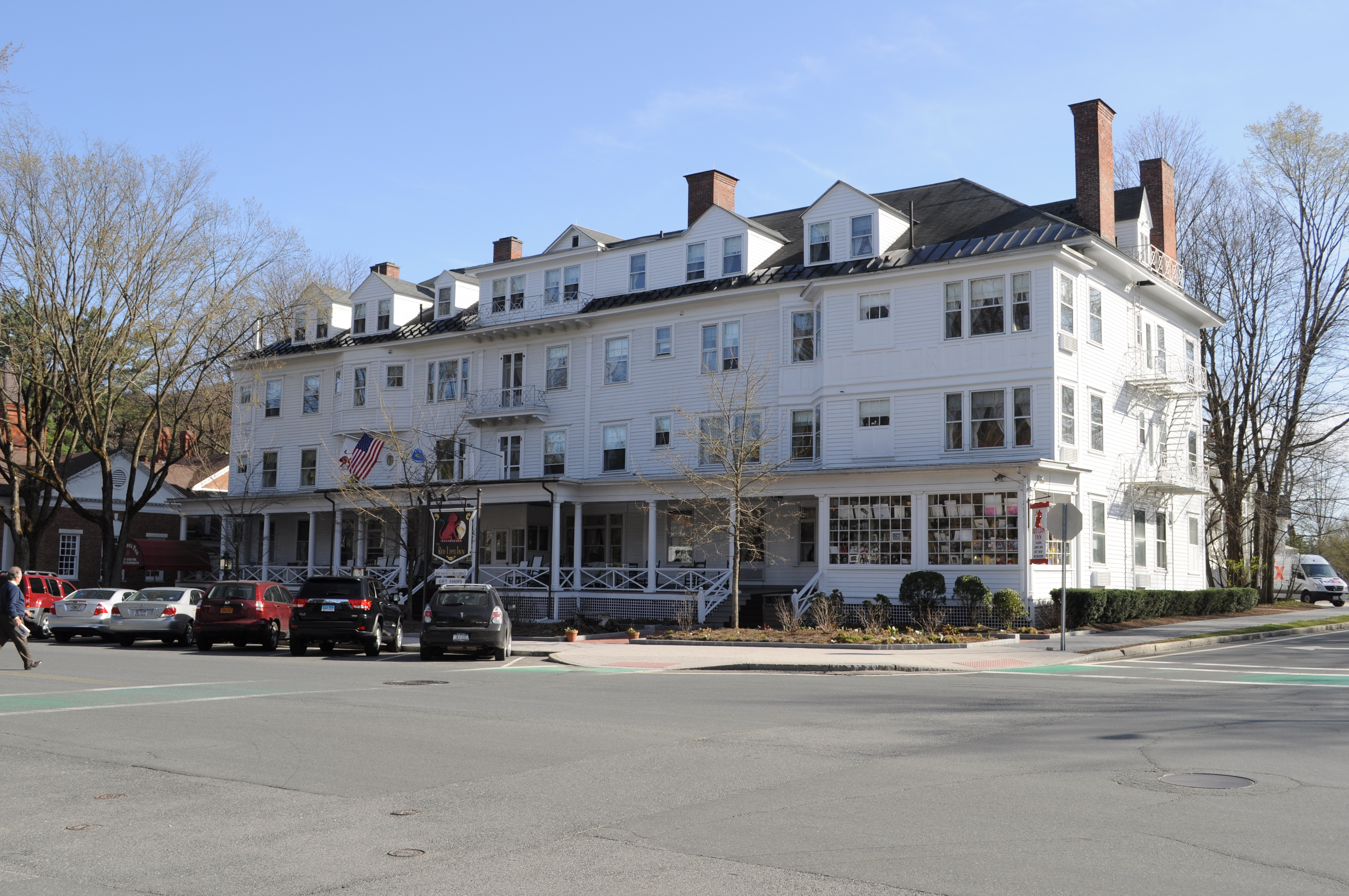
- Red Lion Inn

- Location within Massachusetts Location within the United States
- Location: 1-57 Main St., 1-2 Pine St., 2 Sergeant St., Stockbridge, Massachusetts
- Coordinates: 42°16′55″N 73°19′22″W
- Area: 162 acres (66 ha)
- Built: 1735
- Architect: Bigelow, Ralph; et al.
- Architectural style: Georgian, Federal
- NRHP reference No.: 01001466
- Added to NRHP: January 17, 2002

The Main Street Historic District is a historic district encompassing the scenic and historic portions of Main Street in Stockbridge, Massachusetts. The downtown portion of Main Street is widely recognizable due to its use by Norman Rockwell in his 1967 painting, Main Street, Stockbridge at Christmas. The central portion of Main Street is a broad street with wide green lawns, anchored by a traditional New England town center containing a church and municipal buildings. Along this part of Main Street is the Mission House, a National Historic Landmark that is one of the oldest buildings in Stockbridge, dating to the early 1740s. Further to the west the road is more rural, and the district's western boundary is at the crossing of Main Street over the Housatonic River. The eastern part of the district includes the retail heart of the town, including the Red Lion Inn and several blocks of shops. The far eastern part of the district is Laurel Hill, a wooded park with views of the town center. The district was added to the National Register of Historic Places in 2002.

The Stockbridge area has a significant prehistory of Native American use, with archaeological evidence of human use on at least a seasonal basis dating back for centuries. In the early 18th century it was settled by Mahican Indians who had been driven from the Hudson River area by conflict with the Mohawks. These uses included the establishment of a Native burying ground, which is within the bounds of this district. In 1734, the Province of Massachusetts Bay founded a "Praying Indian" community, with its main settlement where the downtown area is now. The arrival of English squatters and conflicts over land usage patterns led to the Natives eventually losing control of the community. The area's colonial settlement accelerated after the end of the French and Indian War in 1763. The Red Lion Inn opened in 1775, and it flourished in the early 19th century as a crossroads community not far from the county seat at Lenox.

== See also ==
- National Register of Historic Places listings in Berkshire County, Massachusetts
