= Caroline Dutcher Sterling Choate =

American educational reformer and suffragist

Caroline Sterling Choate
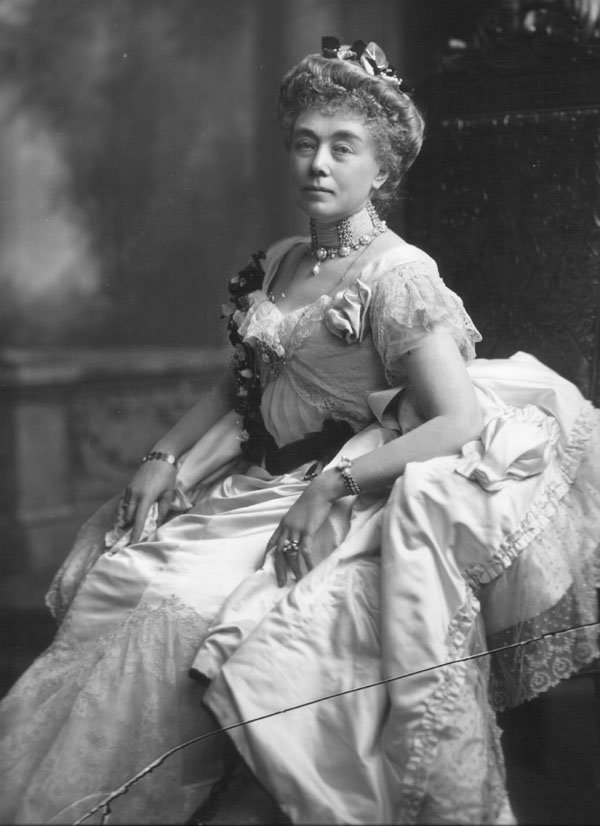
- Choate in 1902
- Born: Caroline Dutcher Sterling; June 16, 1837; Salisbury, Connecticut, US
- Died: November 12, 1929 (aged 92); New York City, US
- Resting place: Stockbridge, Massachusetts, US
- Occupations: Educational reformer and suffragist
- Spouse: Joseph Hodges Choate
- Children: Ruloff Choate, George Choate, Josephine Choate, Mabel Choate, Joseph H. Choate Jr.

Caroline Dutcher Sterling Choate (June 16, 1837 – November 12, 1929, generally styled Mrs. Joseph H. Choate) was an artist, educational reformer, suffragist, philanthropist and socialite. She was the wife of lawyer and U.S. Ambassador to the United Kingdom Joseph Hodges Choate.

As an advocate for women's education, Caroline Sterling Choate was one of the founders of the Association for Promoting the Higher Education of Women in New York in 1882. They petitioned Columbia University to admit women in 1883, but were refused on the grounds that women were not sufficiently prepared. In response, Caroline worked to establish a preparatory school for women, Brearley School, and then Barnard College for women. She was also involved in organizations for women artists, and she and her husband were instrumental in founding the Metropolitan Museum of Art. The family's estate, Naumkeag, is now a public museum and garden.

== Early life ==
Caroline Dutcher Sterling, sometimes known as "Carrie", was born on June 16, 1837, in Salisbury, Connecticut. Her parents were Caroline Mary (or May) Dutcher (July 1, 1806 – January 20, 1898) of Canaan, Connecticut and Frederick Augustine Sterling (March 18, 1796 – January 24, 1859) of Salisbury, Connecticut.

The Sterlings married on June 23, 1825, and had six children. Caroline and one of her brothers were named after their parents. The birth order of Caroline and her siblings is as follows:

- Theodore Sterling (b. 1827)
- Robert Sterling (b. 1829)
- Frederick Augustine Sterling (b. 1831, m. Mary Emma Betts)
- Edward Canfield Sterling (b. 1834)
- Caroline Dutcher Sterling (b. 1837, m. Joseph H. Choate)
- Alfred Elisha Sterling (b. 1843.)

Caroline's father, Frederick Augustine Sterling, worked as a clerk in his father's Salisbury law office, before becoming involved in iron manufacture and lumber. In 1840, the family moved to Geneva, New York for better educational opportunities. In 1849 they moved to Cleveland, Ohio, where Caroline's father owned a saw mill. During the American Civil War, Caroline's father's iron factory at Salisbury provided supplies for the Union Army.

== Education ==
By 1861, Caroline Dutcher Sterling had moved to New York to live with a cousin, Mrs. Rossiter, and study art. She was "intending to devote herself to it as a profession for life, with great prospect of success" and was nicknamed "the Saint" by her friends. She wore a golden wedding band inscribed "wedded to art", a gift from her parents.

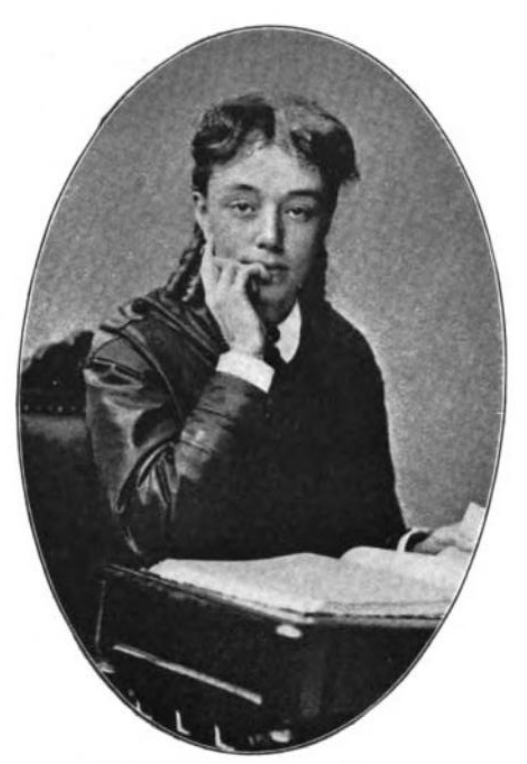
Caroline Sterling Choate, 1863

At the home of artist Thomas Prichard Rossiter, Caroline met lawyer Joseph Hodges Choate. He described Caroline in one of his frequent letters as "very fair haired and very light complexioned,... tall and rather slightly built, has dark brown eyes... She is the most graceful of women. Her self-possession and common sense are remarkable, and she has a force of character and a strength of will which few of her sex can boast."

Choate later described himself as being "as earnestly devoted" to the law as Caroline was to art. However, after meeting Caroline he agreed with his friend John H. Sherwood, who had predicted that he and Caroline would "exactly suit". Choate pursued their acquaintance, and on July 4, 1861, Caroline agreed to marry him.

Choate was a graduate of Harvard Law School, admitted to the bar of Massachusetts in 1855 and of New York in 1856, and in partnership with William M. Evarts and Charles F. Southmayd as of 1859. Joseph Choate had three brothers and two sisters, one of whom was also named Caroline: his sister is sometimes distinguished as Caroline Choate and his wife as Caroline Sterling Choate.

== Marriage ==
On October 16, 1861, Caroline Dutcher Sterling and Joseph Hodges Choate were married by the Reverend Samuel Osgood at the All Souls Unitarian Church on 249 Fourth Avenue near 20th Street, New York. Looking back, Joseph Choate considered it "the most fortunate day of my life". Many years later,

Mr. Choate's deep and abiding affection for his wife was shown in a felicitous way when on being asked, "Who he would rather be if not himself," [he] replied "Mrs. Choate's second husband."

After living for some time with one of Caroline Sterling Choate's aunts, Mrs. Carr, the Choates moved into their first house, at 93 West 21st Street, in May 1863. A second-floor room was to become "Carrie's Studio" and another, adjoining, a library.

=== New York City draft riots, 1863 ===
A few months later, during the New York City draft riots of 1863, the Choates sheltered African Americans from attacks and lynching by white rioters. A woman with two children stayed in the Choate's basement for almost a week; her home had been looted and burned. Another of those hidden was a brother of one of the Choate's servants. When he returned to his boarding house, he found it destroyed. His elderly, crippled landlord had been beaten and lynched. Choate compared "the barbarity and extent of the mob" to the French Revolution.

Joseph Choate himself witnessed the rioters' attack on Quaker abolitionist Abigail Hopper Gibbons' house. He helped her daughters Lucy and Julia to escape, and brought them home to Caroline. Their father James Sloan Gibbons joined them there. Choate wrote to his mother that "Carrie and the girls are very brave, and fear no danger."

=== Rising in society ===
Joseph H. Choate built himself a distinguished career as a lawyer, eventually earning the description of "the greatest jury lawyer of his time". Hard-working and versatile, he became known first for his work as a jury lawyer. In his 40s, after his partner William M. Evarts became involved in government, Choate increasingly took on major roles in appellate cases before the state and Supreme Courts.

Choate tried high-profile cases including the corruption trial of William M. Tweed of Tammany Hall and a repeal of income tax. Some of his cases were extremely high-paying, but he also did pro bono work, as in overturning the Court-martial of General Fitz-John Porter. The combination of birth, talent, and wealth placed Joseph Choate and his wife Caroline in positions of influence in Gilded Age society.

== Work ==
Caroline Sterling Choate largely gave up her career as an artist after her marriage. A number of her paintings are displayed at the family's summer home, Naumkeag.

=== Arts and culture ===
Caroline Sterling Choate redirected her strong interest in art and cultural institutions into volunteer work. She was involved with the New York School of Design for Women, which opened in 1858, preceding and becoming part of the Cooper Union. She served on the school's advisory council for nearly fifty years.

Her husband acted in his capacity as a lawyer to advise or draw up articles of incorporation for institutions of interest to them both. These included the Metropolitan Museum of Art of which Joseph H. Choate was a founder, trustee, and vice-president from 1870–1917.

Caroline was involved in organizing the Society for Decorative Arts, founded in 1877 as a means of supporting unemployed women with artistic talent, many of them Civil War widows. Founder Candace Wheeler recruited Caroline Elizabeth Lamson to gain access to "all the great names in New York", including Caroline Choate.

She was the first Vice President of the Association of Women Painters and Sculptors in New York City in 1915, and one of the vice-presidents of the National Association of Women Painters and Sculptors in 1919.

=== Women and education ===
Perhaps her greatest contributions were in advocating for women's education. Caroline Sterling Choate helped to found the Association for Promoting the Higher Education of Women in New York in 1882, unsuccessfully petitioned Columbia University to admit women in 1883, and helped to found Brearley School in 1884 and Barnard College in 1889.

==== Association for Promoting the Higher Education of Women in New York, 1882 ====
On January 20, 1882, a group of eight society women wrote to President Barnard of Columbia University requesting the reprinting of his speeches on the admission of women to colleges, The higher education of women. Although Caroline Choate was not one of the signers, she was highly interested in the subject. On April 22, 1882, she attended the first meeting of the Association for Promoting the Higher Education of Women in New York.

Caroline Sterling Choate, Margaret Barnard, and other members of the newly formed group decided to petition Columbia University to admit women. President Barnard supported the movement. He wrote to Caroline of the importance of engaging as many voices as possible. By February 5, 1883, the petition had been signed by 1,352 people including U. S. Presidents Chester Alan Arthur and Ulysses S. Grant. Other signatories included Charles J. Folger, Noah Davis, John Forrest Dillon, Howard Crosby, Henry C. Potter, John Hall, Richard S. Storrs, Robert Collyer, Austin Flint I, William A. Hammond, Lloyd Aspinwall, Peter Cooper, Cyrus West Field, Edmund Clarence Stedman and George William Curtis.

On March 5, 1883, the Columbia board rejected the petition, claiming that women lacked adequate preparation for the curriculum. The resulting public outcry moved Columbia University closer to the acceptance of women students. Although Columbia still refused to accept women as students, it was conceded that if they could pass the examinations given to men, Columbia would issue certificates recognizing their level of achievement. It was a small first step, much less than Caroline Choate and others had hoped for, but still something. President Barnard had been right when he warned Caroline Choate that changing tradition would take time.

==== Brearley School, 1884 ====
Caroline's response was to address the problem. If girls were not receiving an adequate education, then their preparation must be improved. She worked with Harvard graduate Samuel A. Brearley to found the Brearley School in 1884. The school's goal was to prepare girls for Columbia. It would become one of the top-ranking schools in the United States. Caroline's daughters Mabel and Josephine, with two of her nieces, were the first students to attend Brearley. Following Samuel A. Brearley, Jr.'s early death of typhoid in 1886, the school was led by James G. Croswell, also from Harvard.

==== Columbia's Teachers' College, 1887 ====
Caroline Sterling Choate was enlisted by Grace Hoadley Dodge as a trustee at Columbia's Teachers' College, along with Mrs. Josiah Macy (Caroline Louisa Everett) and Mrs. Peter M. Bryson. The college was founded in 1887.

==== Barnard College, 1889 ====
Caroline Sterling Choate was also one of the founding trustees of Barnard College and served on its board from 1889 to 1930, a total of 41 years. Fellow female trustees included Frances Fisher Wood, Henrietta E. Francis Talcott, Laura Spelman Rockefeller, and Ella Weed, the first dean of the women's institution. Annie Nathan Meyer recounts that in approaching allies "The very first of these to be thought of was Mrs. Joseph H. Choate... Mrs. Choate not only consented at once to serve on the Board; she was willing to lend her name as its vice-chairman, a position which she most ably filled until physical disability caused her to withdraw from attendance."

In 1925, Annie Meyer unsuccessfully proposed naming the Students' Hall at Barnard College in honor of Mrs. Choate. On February 6, 1930, the trustees of Barnard College passed a resolution acknowledging her contributions: "Mrs. Choate was a very tower of strength to the young and struggling College. Her position in the community gave it prestige and created confidence in its usefulness and its stability. Her knowledge of the educational needs of New York, and her high standards of accomplishment and her energy in making friends for the College, as well as the personal generosity of herself and her husband, put Barnard College immeasurably in her debt."

=== Woman suffrage ===
==== Constitutional Convention of 1894 ====
Though "the great happiness of their marriage was well known and not infrequently mentioned", the Choates did not always agree. Caroline was one of the "gilded suffragists", a group of New York society women who convened women's suffrage meetings in their parlors and lobbied for votes in support of women suffrage, leading up to New York state's Constitutional Convention of 1894. They assembled a petition with 600,000 signees, which was presented at the convention with a proposal to strike the word "male" from the constitution.

Joseph Choate was one of the delegates to the convention and was appointed as president. To the shock of suffragists, Joseph Choate loaded the suffrage committee with anti-suffragists such as Elihu Root, and the proposed amendment for woman's suffrage failed. It was speculated that Choate's actions were an attempt to gain allies for a possible governorship.

=== Other voluntary work ===
Caroline did volunteer work and served on the board of managers of the State Charities Aid Association. The association was formed in 1872 for the improvement of conditions in prisons, hospitals, and other institutions dealing with the poor.

She was counted among the patronesses of the Legal Aid Society. In 1906, the newspapers described her attending a benefit for it, a performance of Hänsel and Gretel given by the Metropolitan Opera. In her box, Caroline wore "a gown of black velvet, with a bertha of Venetian point lace, wearing a tiara of diamonds."

She and her husband supported the New York Association for the Blind, incorporated in 1906, and Booker T. Washington's work at the Tuskegee Institute.

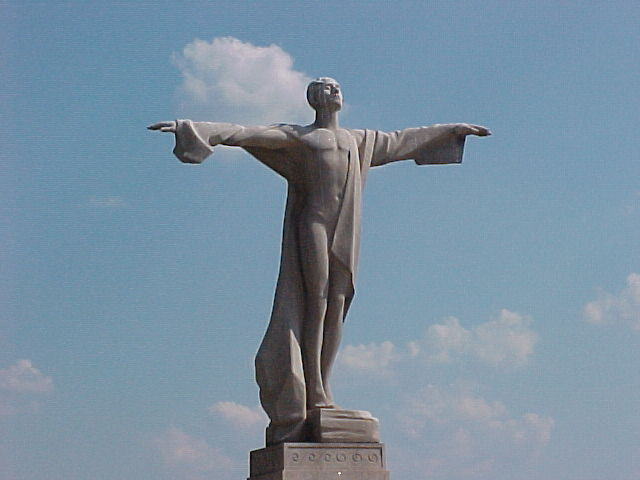
Titanic Memorial, Gertrude Vanderbilt Whitney

Following the disaster of the RMS Titanic in 1912, Caroline Sterling Choate helped to raise funds for the Women's Titanic Memorial Association. This resulted in the creation of the Titanic Memorial by Gertrude Vanderbilt Whitney.

== Ambassadress to the Court of St. James, 1899 ==
In 1899, Joseph Hodges Choate was appointed Ambassador to the Court of St. James in London by President William McKinley. The appointment continued under President Theodore Roosevelt. As a result, Caroline Sterling Choate was Ambassadress from 1899 to 1905.

Although he was instrumental in securing a number of important diplomatic agreements, Queen Victoria considered Joseph Choate loud and lacking in manners. He attended her funeral as a special ambassador. Her successor King Edward and Queen Alexandra paid the Choates an unprecedented honor by dining with them at the American Embassy.

== Children ==
Joseph and Caroline were the parents of five children, two of whom predeceased their parents:

- Ruluff Sterling Choate (September 24, 1864 – April 5, 1884)
- George Choate (January 28, 1867 – 1937)
- Josephine Choate (January 9, 1869 – July 20, 1896)
- Mabel Choate (December 26, 1870 – 1958), who did not marry and became a traveler, gardener and philanthropist.
- Joseph Hodges Choate Jr. (February 2, 1876 – 1968), who married Cora Lyman Oliver, daughter of General Robert Shaw Oliver, in 1903.

== Estate ==
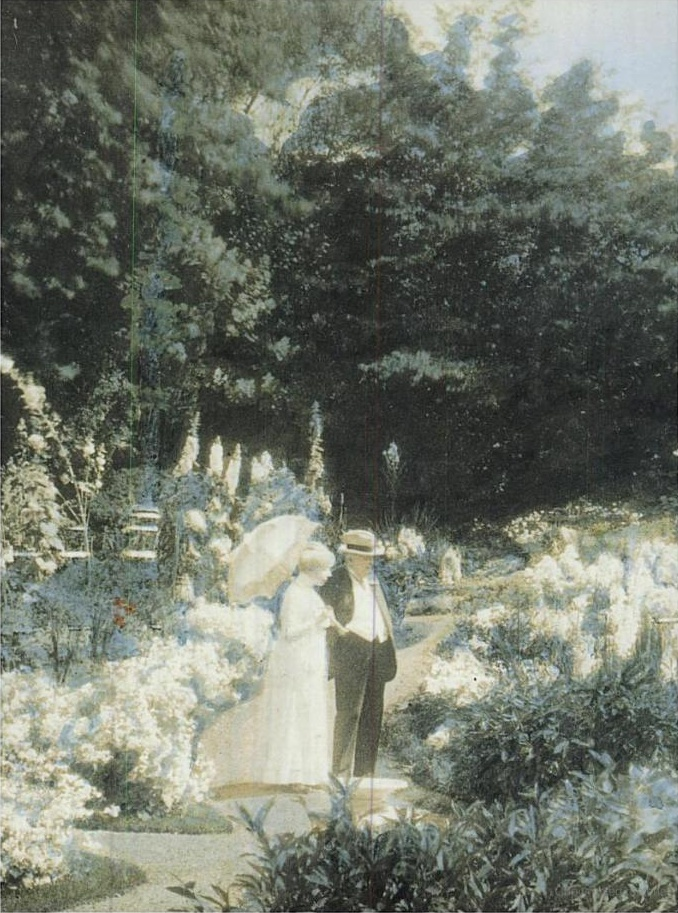
Caroline Dutcher Sterling Choate and her husband Joseph Hodges Choate at their summer house, Naumkeag

The family bought a forty-nine-acre country estate, known as Naumkeag in the Berkshires. The 44-room "cottage" was designed by Stanford White of McKim, Mead & White. The grounds were originally laid out by Nathan Franklin Barrett. The Choate family first occupied it in 1885.

The gardens were further developed by Fletcher Steele in collaboration with Mabel Choate. The house is open to the public as a nonprofit museum in Stockbridge, Massachusetts.

Joseph Hodges Choate died on May 14, 1917, at East 63rd Street in Manhattan. He was buried in the Stockbridge Cemetery in Stockbridge, Massachusetts.

Caroline Sterling Choate died November 12, 1929, at her home in New York City, 8 East Sixty-third Street. The cause was given as heart disease.
