= Berkshire Theatre Festival =

Berkshire Theatre Group
- Berkshire Playhouse, Berkshire Theatre Festival
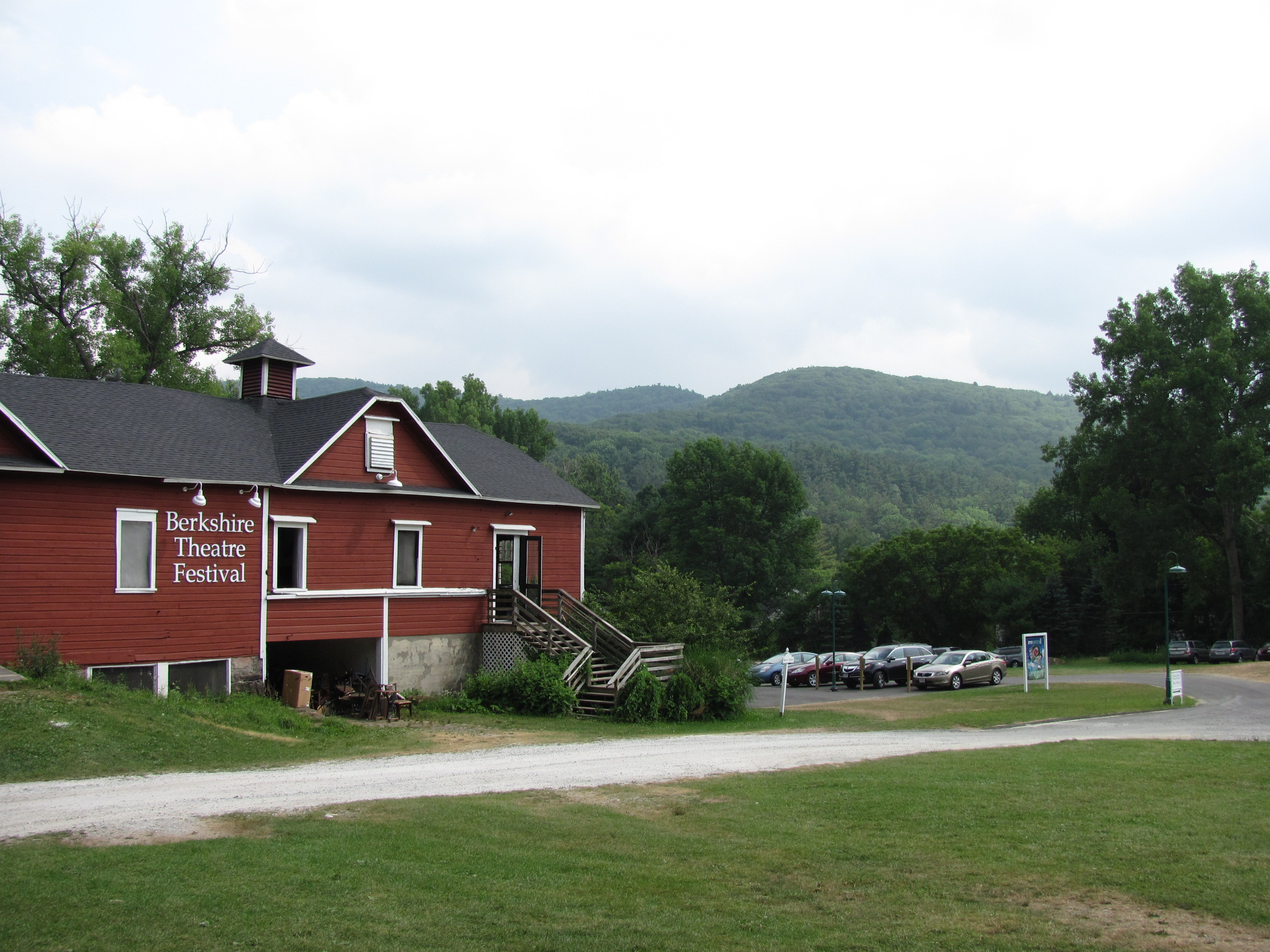
- The Red Barn at the Berkshire Theatre Festival
- Interactive map of Berkshire Theatre Group
- Address: Stockbridge, Massachusetts; United States
- Coordinates: 42.282036°N 73.301226°W
- Owner: Non-profit Organization

Construction
- Opened: 1928

Website
- http://www.berkshiretheatre.org/

The Berkshire Theatre Festival, in the town of Stockbridge, Massachusetts, US, is one of the oldest professional performing arts venues in the Berkshires, established in 1928.

== History ==
The main building of the Berkshire Theatre Festival was originally the Stockbridge Casino, designed by Stanford White and built in 1887. At one point the center of social life in Stockbridge, by 1927 it had fallen into disuse. Mabel Choate, the daughter of one of the casino's founders, purchased the property for $2,000, but wasn't interested in the casino itself (she moved the Mission House to the property). Three prominent Stockbridge residents, sculptor Daniel Chester French, businessman and artist Walter Leighton Clark, and Dr. Austen Fox Riggs, formed a committee called the Three Arts Society to save the casino; Choate sold the building to them for $1 on the condition that it be relocated. French, Clark, and Riggs agreed, and had the structure dismantled and moved to its current location.

After an extensive renovation, the newly christened Berkshire Playhouse opened on June 4, 1928, with a production of "The Cradle Song" with Eva Le Gallienne. Actors who have starred in productions at the Berkshire Playhouse include James Cagney, Lionel Barrymore, Lillian Gish, Katharine Hepburn, and Buster Keaton. Notable producing directors have included Billy Miles, Joan White, Robert Paine Grose, George Tabori, Arthur Penn, Josephine Abady, Julianne Boyd, Bill Gibson, Richard Dunlap, and Arthur Storch.

In 1967, the Three Arts Society was dissolved and the Berkshire Playhouse was incorporated as a nonprofit organization, the Berkshire Theatre Festival. In 1982, the Berkshire Theatre Festival purchased Beaupré Performing Arts Center's property in Stockbridge, renaming it the Lavan Center for the Performing Arts. The site was used as a dormitory, classroom, and performance space for the organization's apprentices and interns.

In 1993, a formal season of plays was offered in the Unicorn Theatre to meet the growing popularity of the festival. Prior to that, the Unicorn had been in use for years to house various offerings over the course of the season, including a slate of cabaret and workshop productions in 1992. The Unicorn Theatre was completely replaced with a new facility prior to the 1996 summer season; the inaugural production in the new space was "L-Play" by Beth Henley.

In 2010, Berkshire Theatre Festival merged with The Colonial Theatre in Pittsfield, MA to form Berkshire Theatre Group.

The Berkshire Playhouse facility was added to the National Register of Historic Places in 1976.

== Past seasons ==
Over the past 80 years, the Berkshire Theatre Festival has produced 550 fully staged productions, including revivals, classics and premieres. More than 2,100 actors have worked at the BTF in more than 6,000 performances, including notable actors that have won Emmys, Oscars, and Tonys. Many playwrights at BTF have won Pulitzer and Nobel Prizes.

== Notable Artists ==
Buster Keaton
Ethel Barrymore
Thornton Wilder
Calista Flockhart
Christopher Walken in The Rain Maker
Al Pacino in Does a Tiger Wear a Necktie (1967)
Dustin Hoffman in Fragments (1966)
Gene Hackman in Fragments (1966)
Karen Allen
Linda Hamilton
Jeffrey Donovan in Toys in the Attic (2000)
Randy Harrison in Equus, Amadeus, One Flew Over the Cuckoo's Nest, Mrs. Warren's Profession, Waiting for Godot, Ghosts, The Endgame, and The Who's Tommy
Kate Baldwin in A Little Night Music (2014), What the Constitution Means to Me (2023)
Christine Lahti in the world premiere of The Smile of Her (2023)
