= Mission House (Stockbridge, Massachusetts) =

Historic house in Massachusetts, United States

- U.S. National Register of Historic Places
- U.S. National Historic Landmark
- U.S. Historic district – Contributing property
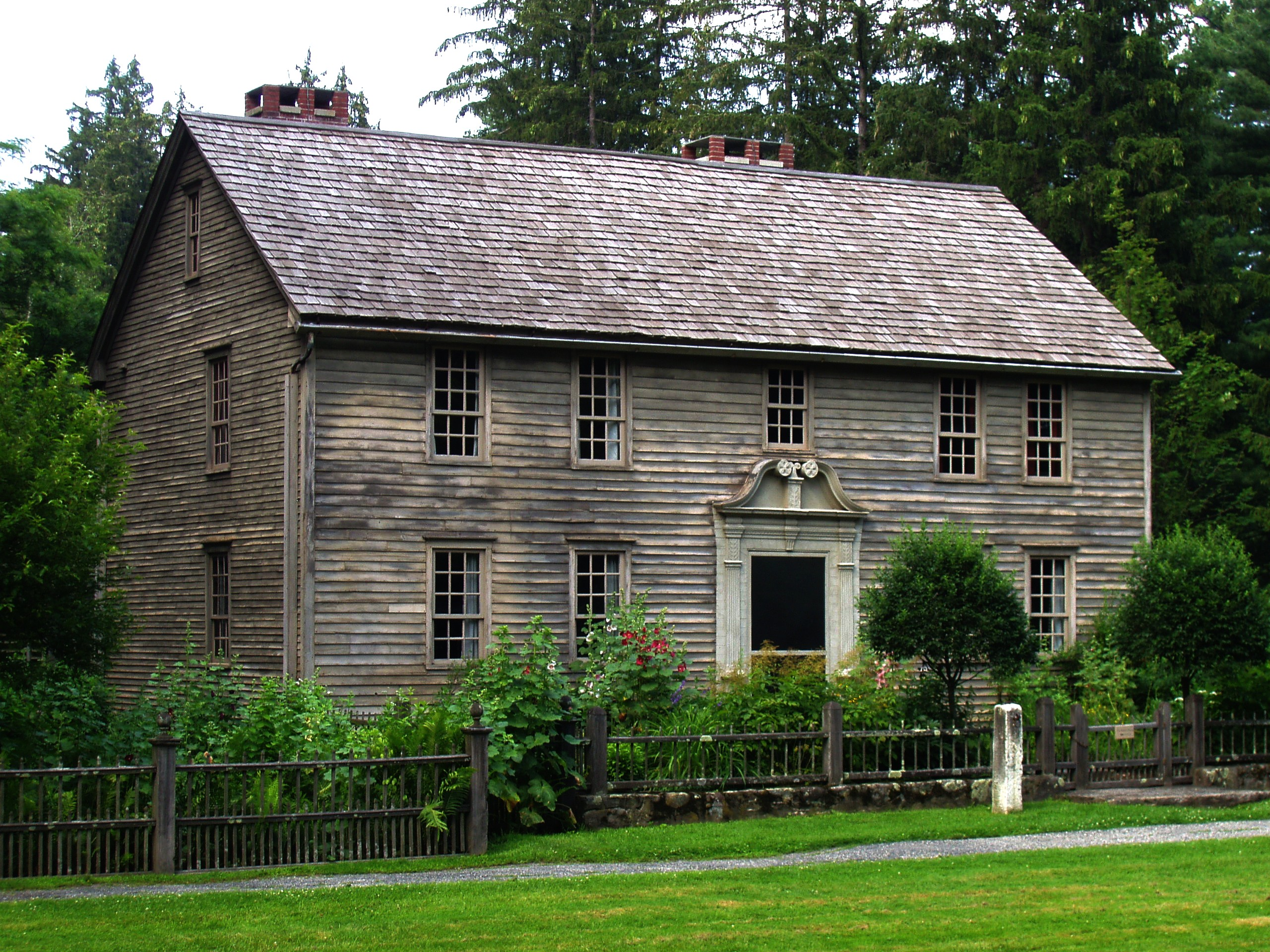

- Location within Massachusetts Location within the United States
- Location: Stockbridge, Massachusetts
- Coordinates: 42°16′59.6″N 73°18′57.1″W
- Built: c. 1742
- Architect: John Sergeant
- Architectural style: Georgian
- Part of: Main Street Historic District
- NRHP reference No.: 68000038

Significant dates
- Added to NRHP: November 24, 1968
- Designated NHL: November 24, 1968
- Designated CP: January 17, 2002

The Mission House is an historic house located at 19 Main Street, Stockbridge, Massachusetts. It was built between 1741 and 1742 by a Christian missionary to the local Mahicans. It is a National Historic Landmark, designated in 1968 as a rare surviving example of a colonial mission house. It is now owned and operated as a nonprofit museum by the Trustees of Reservations.

The town of Stockbridge was established in the late 1730s as a mission community to the Mahicans. John Sergeant was the first missionary, formally beginning his service in 1735. His first house, built in the valley where the Indians lived, has not survived; this house was built in the white community on the hill above the town following his marriage in 1739. It remained in the Sergeant family until the 1870s, and survived Gilded Age developments of the late 19th century.

In the 1920s the house was purchased by Mabel Choate, owner of the nearby Naumkeag estate, and moved down into the valley. She and landscape designer Fletcher Steele restored the building, furnished it with 18th century pieces, and designed gardens to Steele's vision of what a colonial landscape might have been. Choate opened the house as a museum in 1930, and donated it (and eventually Naumkeag as well) to the Trustees of Reservations, who operate both properties as museums.

== Background ==
Before the arrival of British colonists, the area that is now southern Berkshire County, Massachusetts was inhabited by communities of the Mahican tribal confederation. The population of these communities changed over the 17th century as war (sometimes with European colonists and sometimes with the neighboring Iroquois), disease, and migration made them smaller and more diverse. By the 1720s they had sold off most of their tribal lands, and lived in relative peace in two remaining tracts of land on the Housatonic River.

Beginning in the late 1720s the Mahicans became a point of interest to British missionary organizations, because they were seen as potential conversion targets and to counter the possibility of influence on them from Roman Catholic New France. This effort was managed in New England by a commission headed by the governor of the Province of Massachusetts Bay, Jonathan Belcher. Belcher suggested in 1730 that the province lay out a town in the Mahican lands, and that London missionary groups pay for a mission there. Funds were allocated for this effort in 1733.

In 1734 Massachusetts residents in the Northampton area met to organize the mission. John Sergeant, a recent graduate of Yale College, agreed to take on the task, and spent some time that fall among the Mahicans. After negotiations involving Governor Belcher and Mahican leaders, it was agreed in 1735 that a mission would be established, and Sergeant was ordained to serve as a minister among them. He immediately moved to the Mahican lands and began preaching to and baptizing them.

In 1736 a township of six square miles (16 km^{2}) was formally granted to the Mahicans by the Province of Massachusetts Bay, which would be incorporated in 1739 as Stockbridge. Included in the grant were provisions that the minister and schoolteacher receive land grants, and that four English families settle the area, in part to set an example of Christian living for the natives. John Sergeant built a modest frontier house in the township, and the Indian village grew around this area, which included a meeting house used as a church and school.

== House history ==
In 1739 Sergeant married Abigail Williams, the seventeen-year-old daughter of one of Stockbridge's English colonists. She wanted to live outside the village, so Sergeant had a new house, the subject of this article, built on Prospect Hill, overlooking the village. The date of its construction is uncertain: Sergeant received the land in 1739 after Stockbridge's incorporation, and the house is known to have been built by 1742.

The Sergeants lived there until his death in 1749. Abigail remarried and eventually moved out of the house, but it remained in the family. She returned to it after her second husband's death, living with her son's family until her own death in 1791. Jonathan Edwards, a minister who rose to fame during the First Great Awakening, succeeded Sergeant as missionary to the Mahicans (who also became known as "Stockbridge Indians" and "Mohicans"), but occupied the first house Sergeant built. That house has not survived, but its site is now marked by a sundial near 23 Main Street.

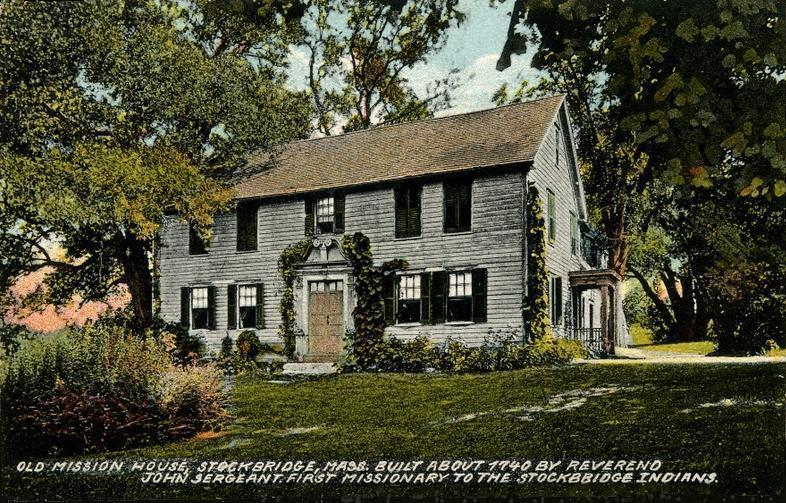
Mission House in c. 1908 postcard (as it looked in its original location)

Sergeant's second house remained in the family until 1879, when the property was sold to David Dudley Field, Jr., a New York City lawyer. Field amassed an estate of some 115 acres (47 ha), on which he built a large summer house; the mission house he rented out for several summers to friends. It subsequently fell into disrepair, and was rescued in the 1920s by Mabel Choate, the daughter of New York lawyer Joseph Hodges Choate and owner of the nearby Naumkeag estate, who sought to establish it as a museum in memory of her parents.

Sometime around 1926, Choate purchased the mission house. The house was then disassembled, and its pieces carefully numbered. In 1927 she purchased the lot at 19 Main Street where the house now stands, formerly the site of the Stockbridge Casino; the casino building she sold for $1, and it was moved to its present location east of town, where it serves as the home of the Berkshire Theatre Festival. In 1928 the house was reconstructed at its present location under the guidance of landscape designer Fletcher Steele. The property on which it originally stood is now the site of the Roman Catholic National Shrine of The Divine Mercy.

The house's gardens were created between 1928 and 1932 by Steele (who was also responsible for significant work on Naumkeag's gardens). The house was furnished under Choate's guidance with pieces appropriate to the Sergeant period, and opened as a museum in 1930. She donated the house and surrounding property to the Trustees of Reservations in 1948, and bequeathed it part of her collection.

Included in Choate's bequest to the museum was a two-volume Bible that had been given to the Mahicans in 1745 by Francis Ayscough. Choate had in the 1930s convinced the elders of the Stockbridge-Munsee tribe (successors to the Mahicans) to sell her the Bible for display in the museum. Tribe members objected to the sale after it took place, but no action was taken, and the Bible's location was lost to the tribe until it was spotted by tribal members in the museum in 1975. Following negotiations, the Trustees of Reservations returned the Bible to the tribe in 1991.

== House and gardens ==
The mission house now stands on a lot approximately 0.4 acres (0.16 ha) in size. The layout of the house is a standard Georgian center-hall plan, with fireplaced rooms (a parlor to the left, and kitchen to the right) on either side of a central hall, which has a stairway to the second floor. Behind the parlor is an office space where Sergeant would have met with Indians. A diversion from the typical Georgian plan is the presence of a second entrance on the right side of the house, and a narrow hallway running from that entrance to the office. This made it possible for Sergeant's Indian visitors to reach his office without passing through the front of the house. The front door is adorned with a remarkably well-preserved specimen of a Connecticut River valley front door pediment.

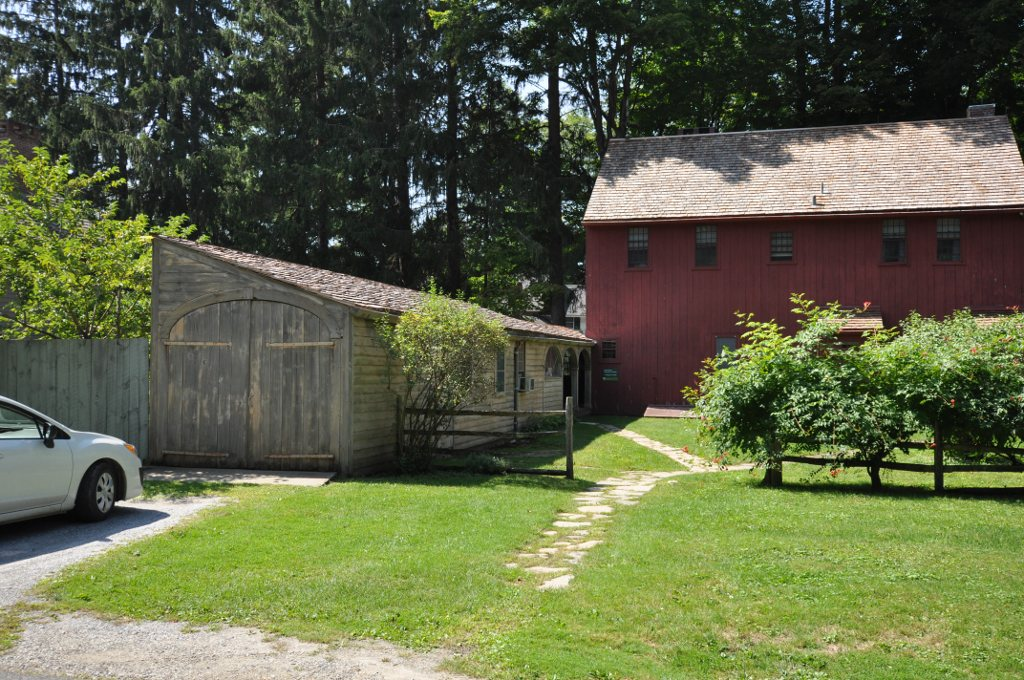
Outbuildings of the site behind the main house

The property features several outbuildings, generally dating from the time of the restoration. A small one-room frame building in the southwest corner serves as a visitor center. Behind the house is a long one-story building that houses museum exhibits, as well as a storage and utility area. It is connected to the house itself by a 25-foot (7.6 m) grape arbor. Northeast of the house is a large barn-like building housing function facilities and a caretaker's apartment.

The gardens and outbuildings of the property were designed to Fletcher Steele's vision of what colonial garden should be. He drew on ideas seen in the gardens of George Washington's estate at Mount Vernon to design a property where "a hundred forms of industry were carried on". Rows of vegetables, fruit trees, and bushes, were lined with flowers for aesthetic appeal, and spaces for carved out that he envisioned would have been used for performing outdoor work such as chopping wood, churning butter, and preparing preserves. Echoing statements made in his Design of a Little Garden, published just a few years earlier, Steele laid out the outbuildings in such a way to provide the homeowners a private retreat.

The house was declared a National Historic Landmark in 1968, and listed on the National Register of Historic Places. It contains a collection of eighteenth-century American furniture and decorative arts. It is open to the public on summer weekends or by appointment.

== See also ==
- List of historic houses in Massachusetts
- List of National Historic Landmarks in Massachusetts
- National Register of Historic Places listings in Berkshire County, Massachusetts
