= Mabel Choate =

American gardener, collector and philanthropist

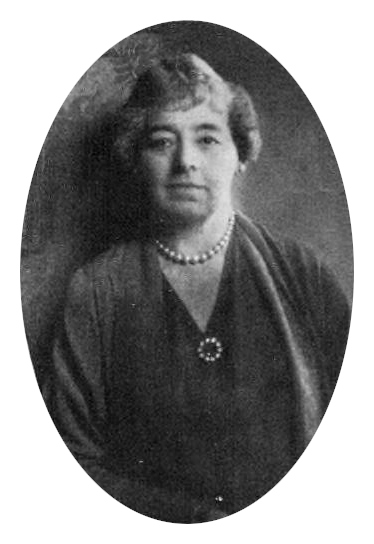
Mabel Choate

Mabel Choate (December 26, 1870 – December 11, 1958) was an American gardener, collector, and philanthropist.

== Biography ==
Born on December 26, 1870, in New York City, Mabel Choate was the fourth of five children of Joseph Choate and Caroline Sterling. Her father Joseph Choate was a prominent lawyer, and served as U.S Ambassador to the United Kingdom from 1899 to 1904. Her mother, Caroline Sterling, an artist and educational reformer, played an instrumental role in advancing women’s higher education, and, along with a group of women including Annie Nathan Meyer, founded Barnard College at Columbia University in 1888.

She studied at Brearley School, which was founded by her mother.

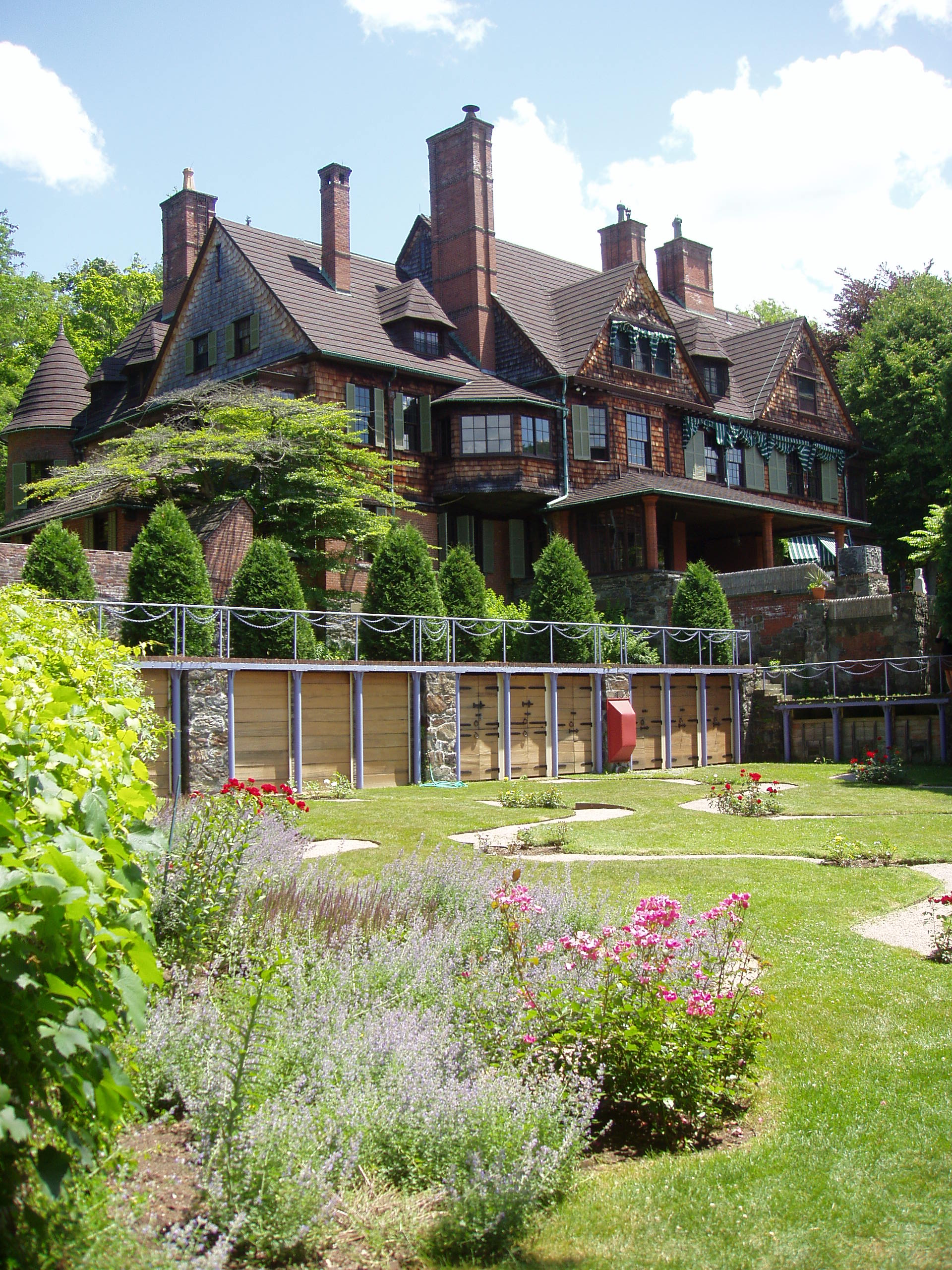
Naumkeag (Stockbridge, MA) - general view

Her family summered at Naumkeag, their “summer cottage” on Prospect Hill in Stockbridge, Massachusetts, which was designed by the New York City-based firm McKim, Mead & White.

In July 1926, she met Fletcher Steele, prominent American landscape architect, while he was delivering a lecture at the Lenox Garden Club. With the help of Fletcher Steele, she developed a series of modernist gardens at Naumkeag, which made it as one of the horticultural show places of the Berkshires.

In 1927, she purchased the historic Mission House. It was built c. 1740 for Reverend John Sergeant, the first missionary to the local Mohican people. Choate saved the house from demolition and turned it into a historic house museum. She was also a collector of ceramics, furniture, and fine and decorative arts including from China and India.

She did not marry. She was actively involved in philanthropic activities, and associated with a number of professional associations at different capacities.

She died in New York City on December 11, 1958. She left both Naumkeag and the Mission House to the Trustees of Reservations to be preserved for public enjoyment.
