= Naumkeag =

Historic house in Massachusetts, United States

- U.S. National Register of Historic Places
- U.S. National Historic Landmark District
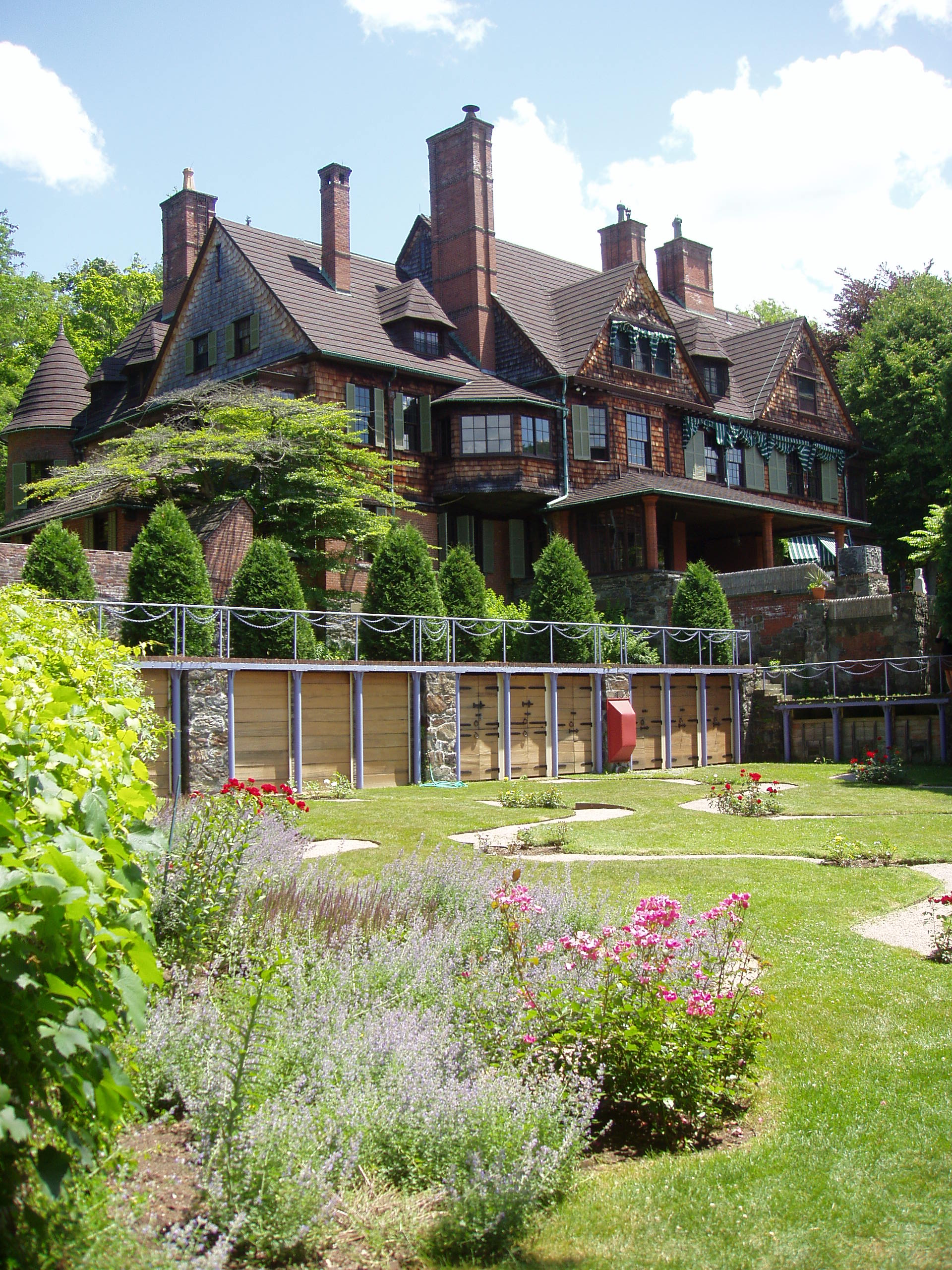
- Location: 5 Prospect Hill Rd; Stockbridge, Massachusetts
- Coordinates: 42°17′22.9″N 73°18′57.1″W
- Built: 1886–87
- Architect: Stanford White; Landscape Architect: Fletcher Steele
- Architectural style: Shingle Style
- NRHP reference No.: 75000264

Significant dates
- Added to NRHP: November 3, 1975
- Designated NHLD: March 29, 2007

Naumkeag is the former country estate of noted New York City lawyer Joseph Hodges Choate and Caroline Dutcher Sterling Choate, located at 5 Prospect Hill Road, Stockbridge, Massachusetts. The estate's centerpiece is a 44-room, Shingle Style country house designed principally by Stanford White of McKim, Mead & White, and constructed in 1885 and 1886.

The estate is noted for its large gardens, which were designed in the mid-20th century by noted landscape designer Fletcher Steele in conjunction with Mabel Choate. A National Historic Landmark District, Naumkeag is now owned by The Trustees of Reservations, who operate it as a nonprofit museum.

== Description ==
Naumkeag was designed by architect Stanford White of McKim, Mead & White in 1885 as the summer estate for Joseph Hodges Choate (1832–1917), a prominent New York City attorney and American ambassador to the United Kingdom from 1899 to 1905, and his wife Caroline Dutcher Sterling Choate, an artist and advocate for women's education. Naumkeag was later the residence of his daughter Mabel.

The house is built in the Shingle Style with a wood-shingled exterior featuring brick and stone towers, prominent gables and large porch, and interiors with fine woodwork. It contains the Choate family's furniture, Chinese porcelain, and artwork collected from America, Europe, and the Far East.

The house sits within 8 acres (3.2 ha) of terraced gardens (including The Rose Garden, The Afternoon Garden, and The Chinese Garden) and landscaped grounds surrounded by 40 acres (16 ha) of woodland, meadow, and pasture. Its grounds were first designed in the late 1880s by Nathan Franklin Barrett, then replanned and expanded between 1926 and 1956 by the noted landscape designer Fletcher Steele. Barrett's original designs included two terraces, perennial beds (now the Chinese Garden), and an evergreen topiary. Steele's additions include the Afternoon Garden (1926); arguably his most famous design, the Blue Steps (1938); and the Chinese Garden (1936–1955).

== History ==
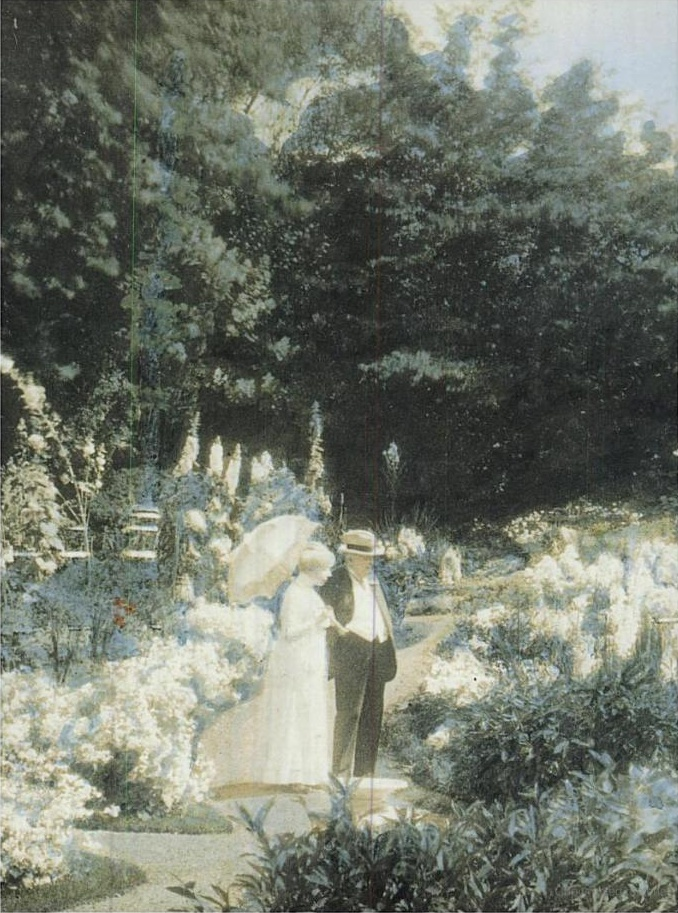
An autochrome of the Choates in Naumkeag's garden, c. 1910

Colonial settlement of the Prospect Hill section of Stockbridge began with the town's founding as a Native American mission community in the 1730s. The future site of Naumkeag was probably acquired by New York lawyer David Dudley Field in the 1870s, and purchased by Joseph Hodges Choate in 1884. Choate's family had vacationed in Stockbridge (where Choate's law partners also summered), and had picnicked on the property. Choate persuaded Field (whom he had opposed in the Boss Tweed legal cases) to part with 40 acres (16 ha) on the south side of the hill.

Choate was a longtime friend of architect Charles McKim, but most of the architectural design work was done by McKim's partner Stanford White. Although design work began shortly after the purchase, construction was delayed by the death of Choate's son. The house was completed in 1886 at a cost of about $35,000. White was also instrumental in providing the decorations and furnishings of the house, traveling to Europe with the Choates for the purpose.

The house underwent a variety of alterations and additions, some guided by architects George de Gersdorff (Joe Choate's nephew) and Charles Platt. The library was expanded in 1897, enclosing a space that had once served as a south-facing porch. The number of bathrooms was raised from three to nine in the early years of the 20th century. These changes, which included the addition of a porch to the master bedroom, necessitated the addition of a dormer on the third floor and a number of new windows. During the period of Mabel Choate's ownership only modest changes were made.

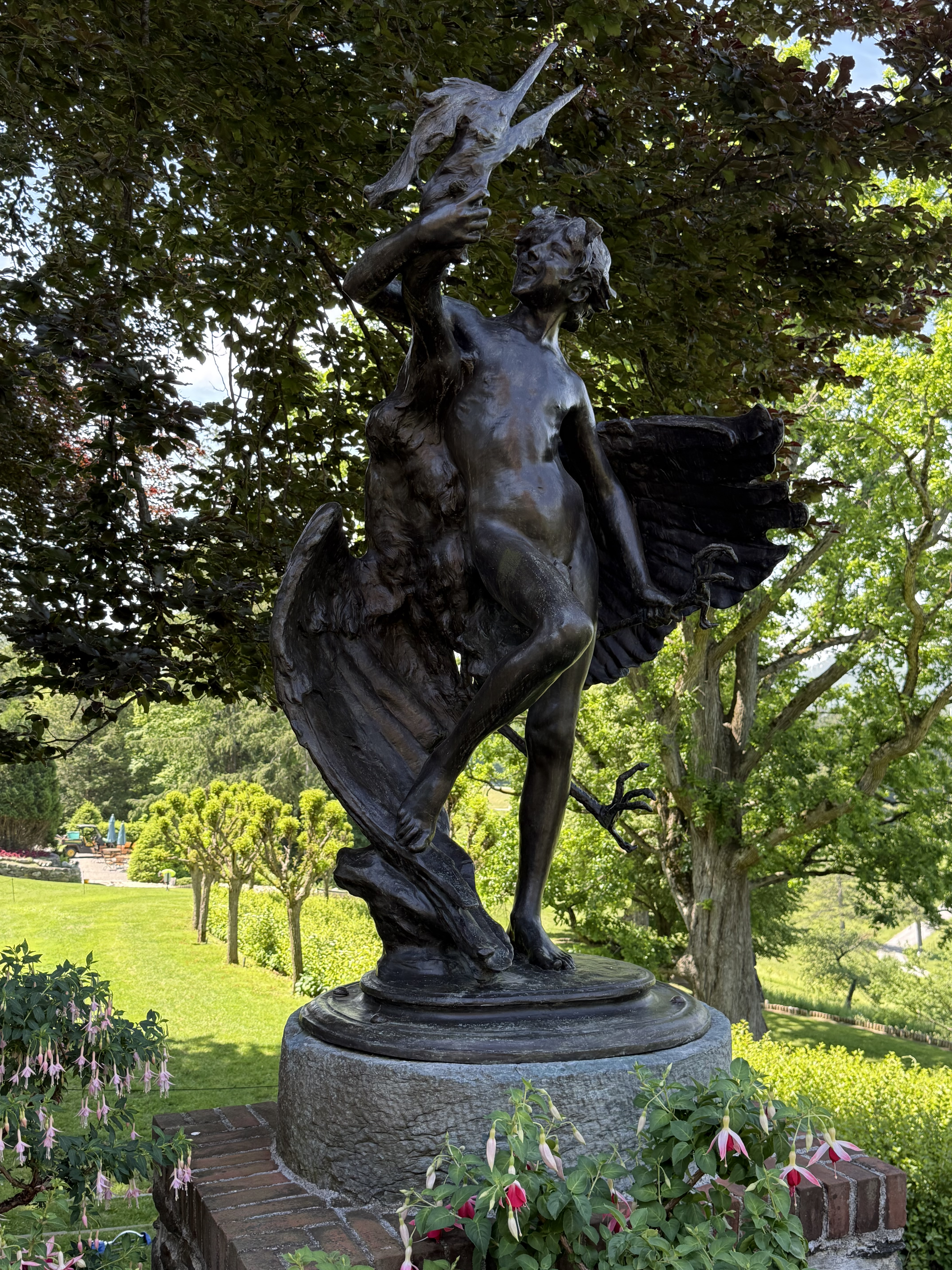
Young Faun with Heron by Frederick MacMonnies, as seen at Naumkeag in Stockbridge, MA

Joseph Choate first offered the landscape design to Frederick Law Olmsted, but rejected his proposal to place the house halfway down the hill, where a favorite oak tree was located. The landscaping contract was instead given to Nathan Barrett, a self-taught designer then best known for his municipal work. Barrett's vision of the landscape was implemented between 1884 and 1894. His design included formal flower gardens near the house, and had a broad meadow slope down the hill, with an orchard. Choate commissioned White's friend and sculptor Frederick MacMonnies to produce a work; the result was Young Faun with Heron.

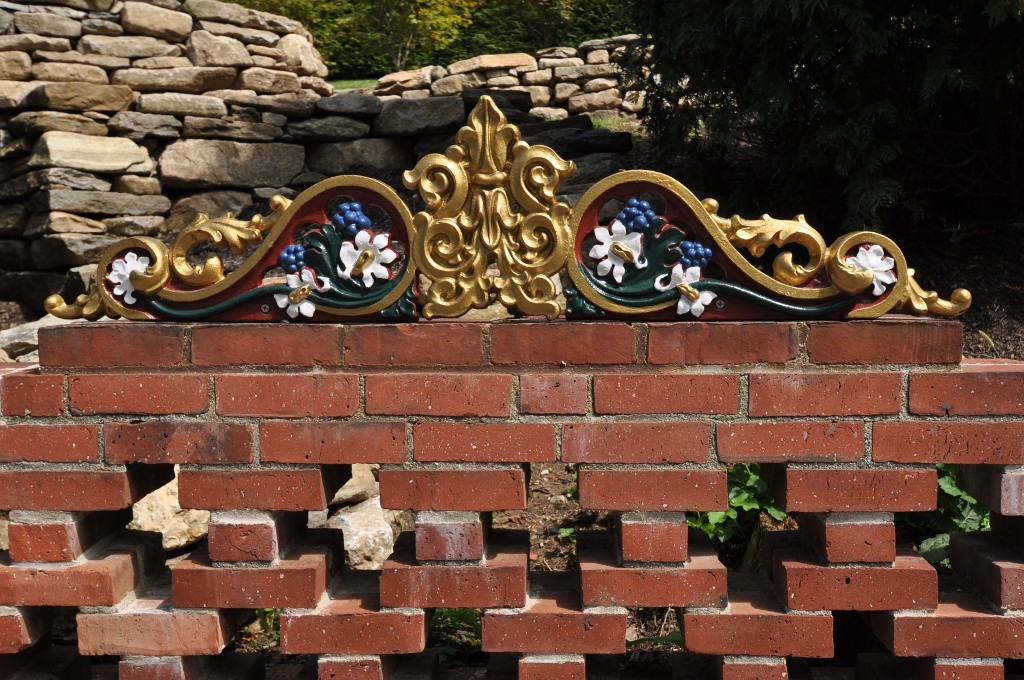
A garden wall

Between 1895 and 1925 minor changes were made to the gardens under the guidance of Percival Gallagher and Marian Coffin. Design decisions in the later years were dominated by Choate's daughter Mabel, especially after Joseph Choate's death in 1917. Mable Choate was a "preservationist, horticulturist, traveler, and collector of art." Mabel acquired full control of the estate after her mother's death in 1929. Mabel Choate began her long and fruitful collaboration with designer Fletcher Steele in 1926. Upon her death in 1958 the estate was bequeathed to the Trustees of Reservations, to be "an authentic representation of the times and manner of living which it now [1958] reflects." Of the approximately 700 gardens designed by Fletcher Steele, the Naumkeag garden is one of only two that now exist and the only one which is open to the public.

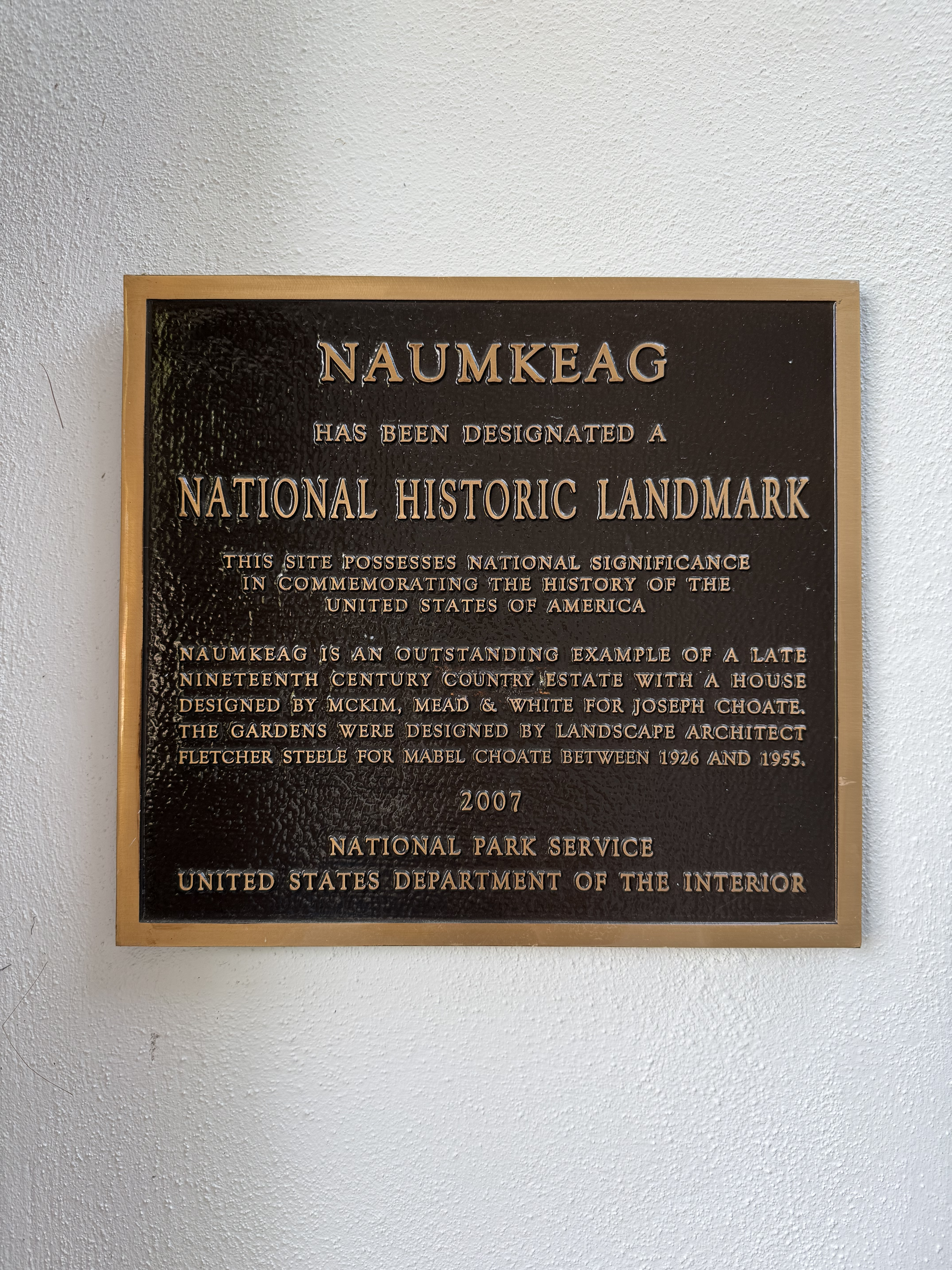
National Historic Landmark sign for Naumkeag

Naumkeag's main house was listed on the National Register of Historic Places in 1975; the listing was expanded and the entire estate was designated a National Historic Landmark District in 2007. Its designation was made for the architecture and content of the house, which are well-preserved examples of a Gilded Age country estate, and for the innovative landscape design work of Fletcher Steele.

== Image gallery ==
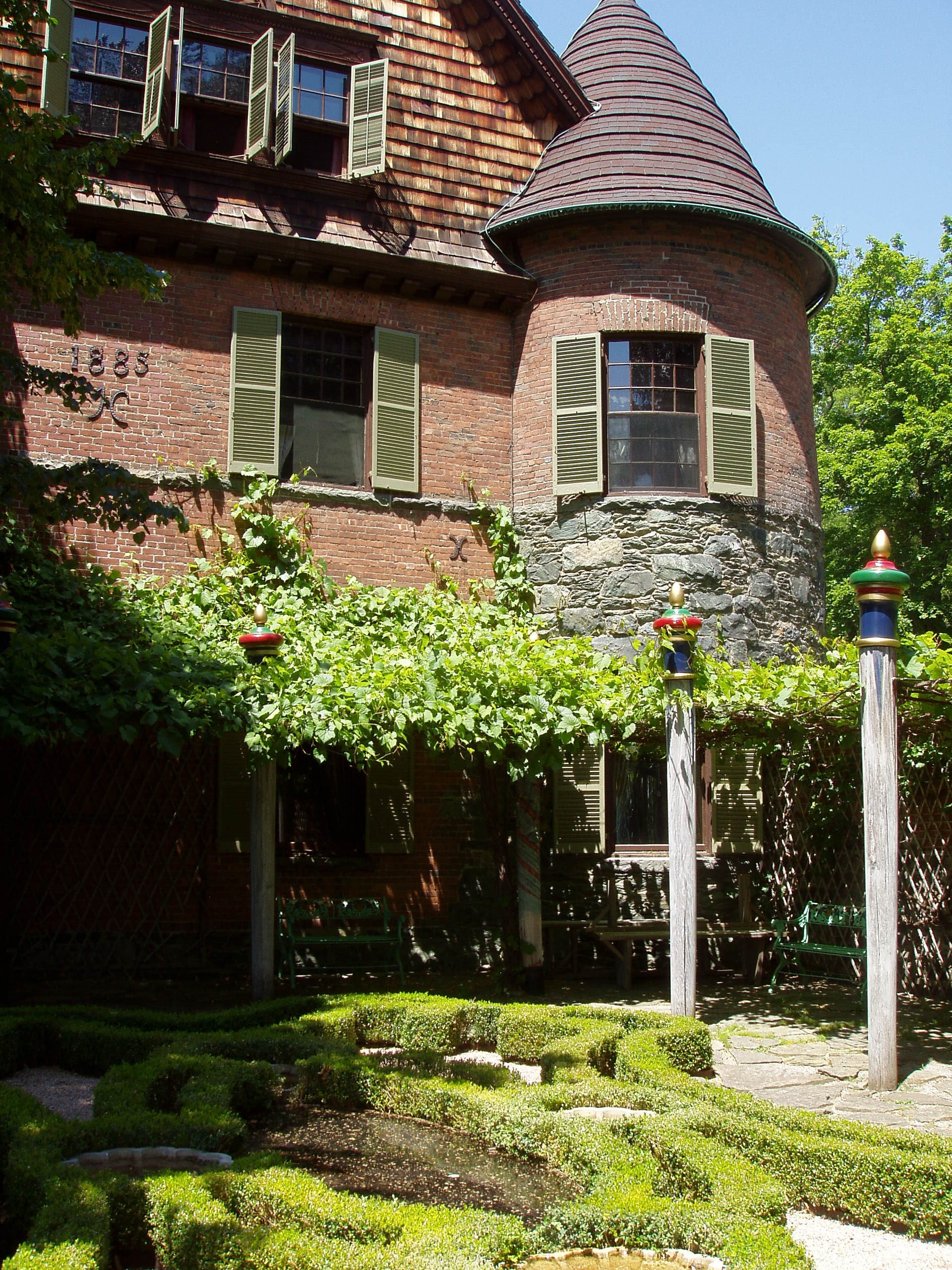
Afternoon Garden

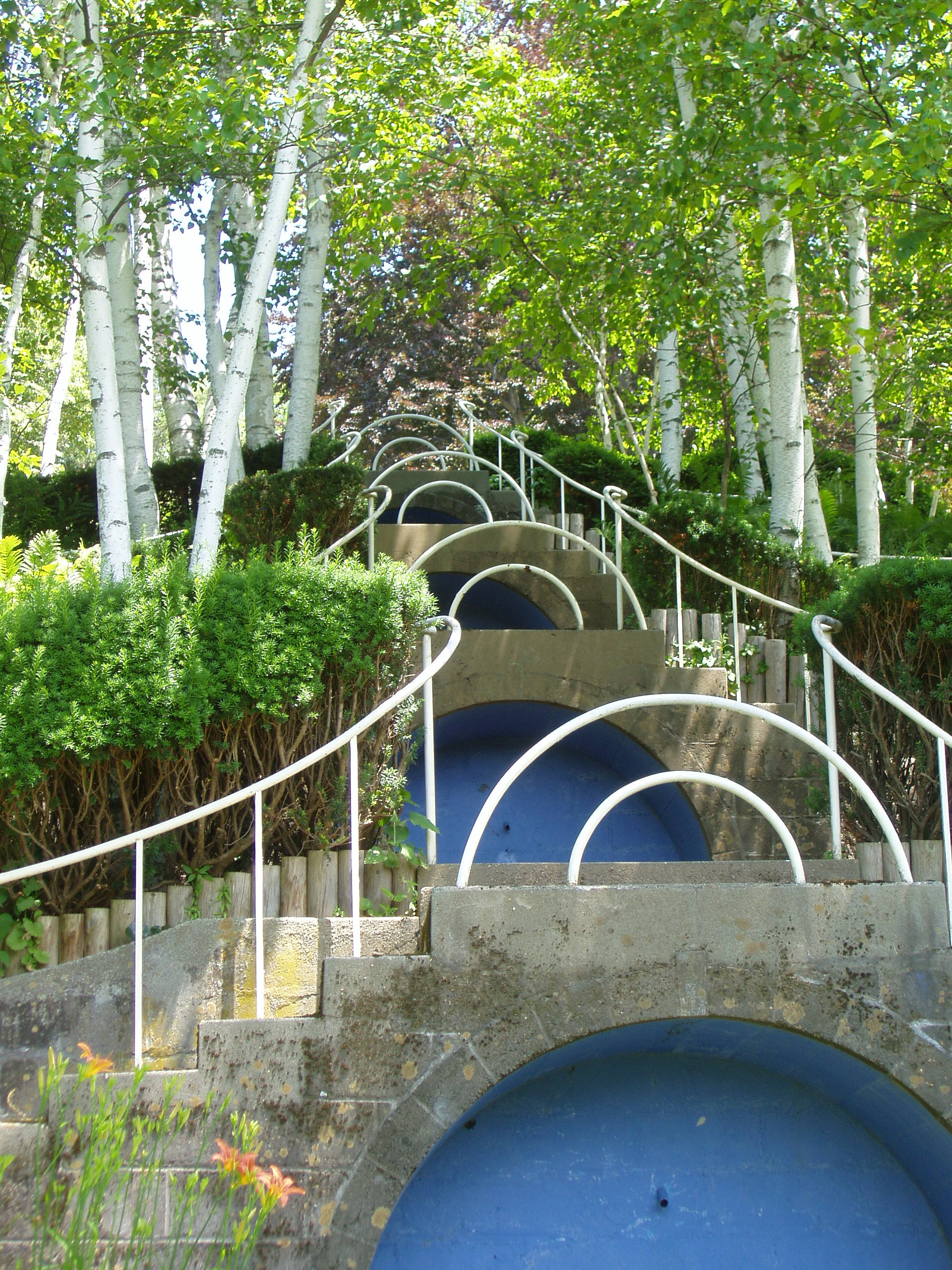
Blue Steps

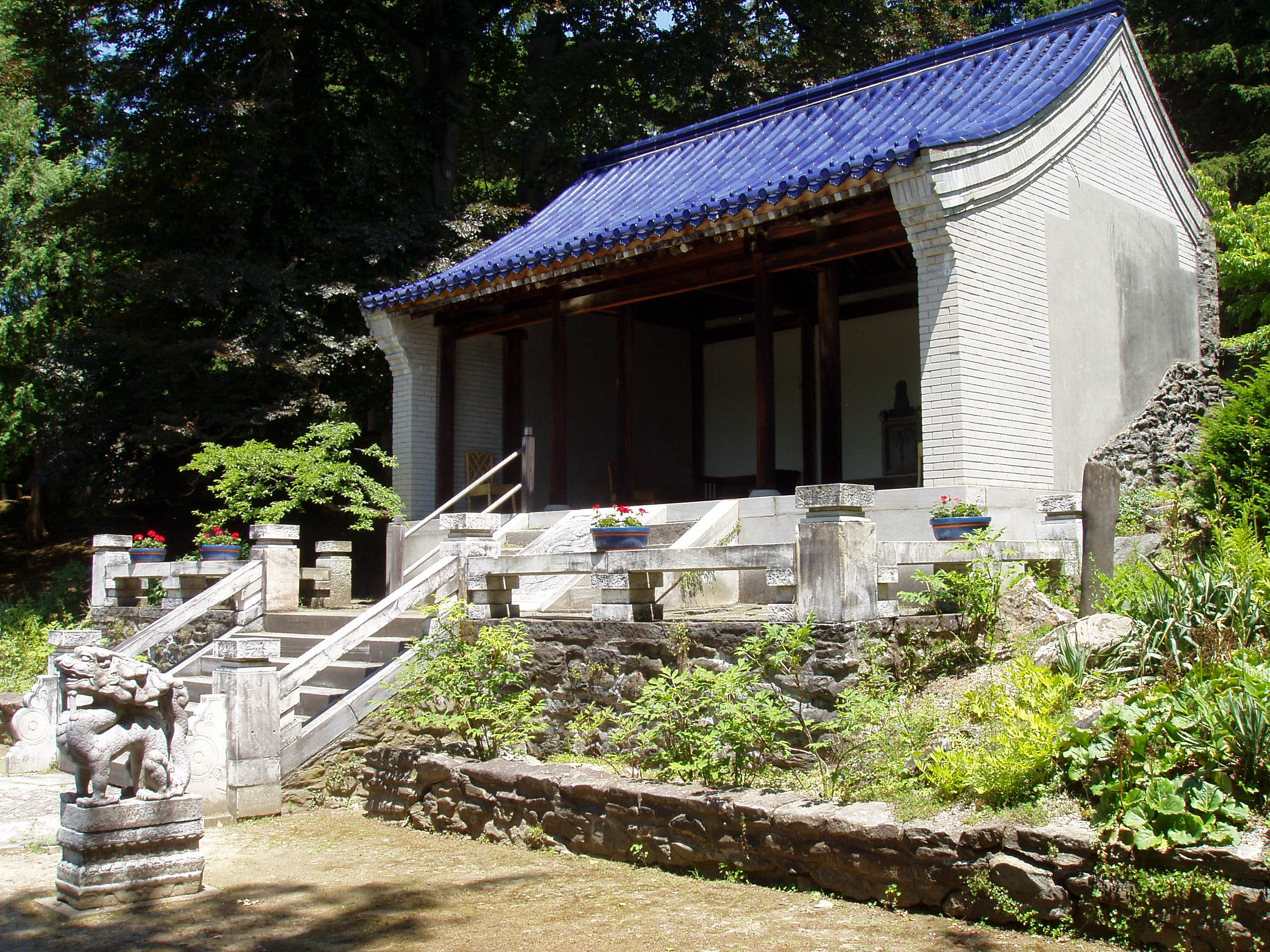
Chinese Garden

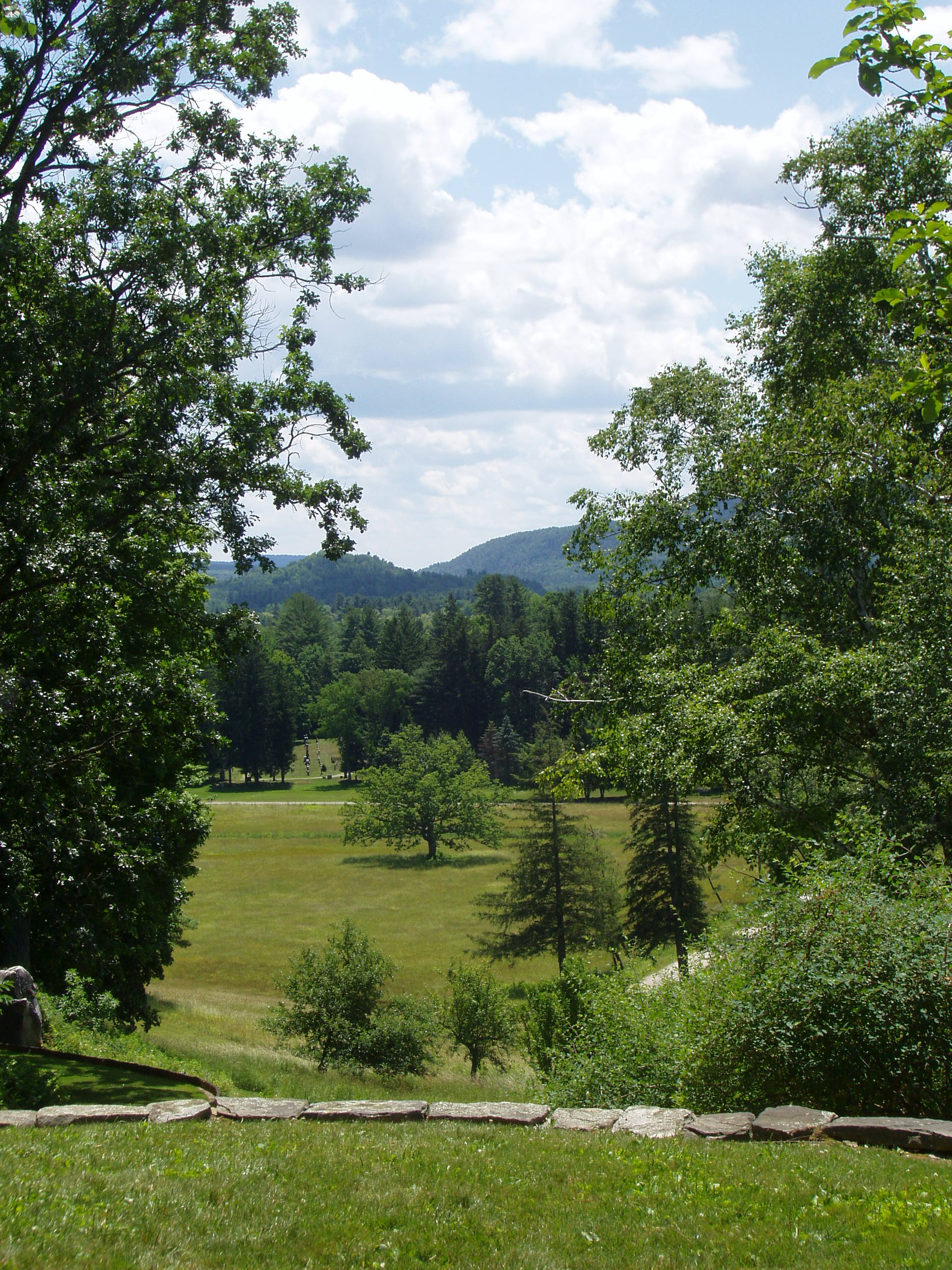
Grounds

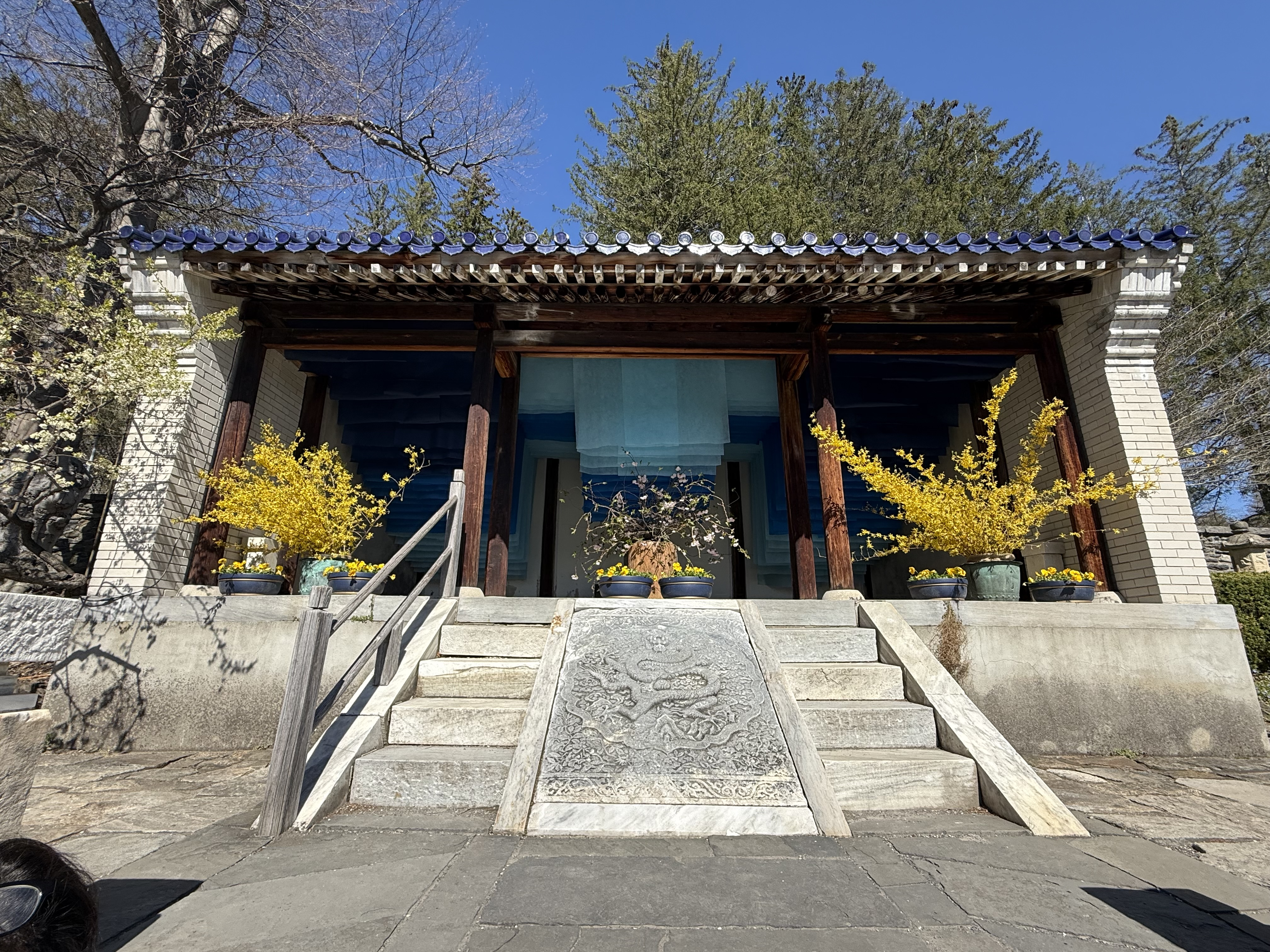
Chinese Garden Structure, spring

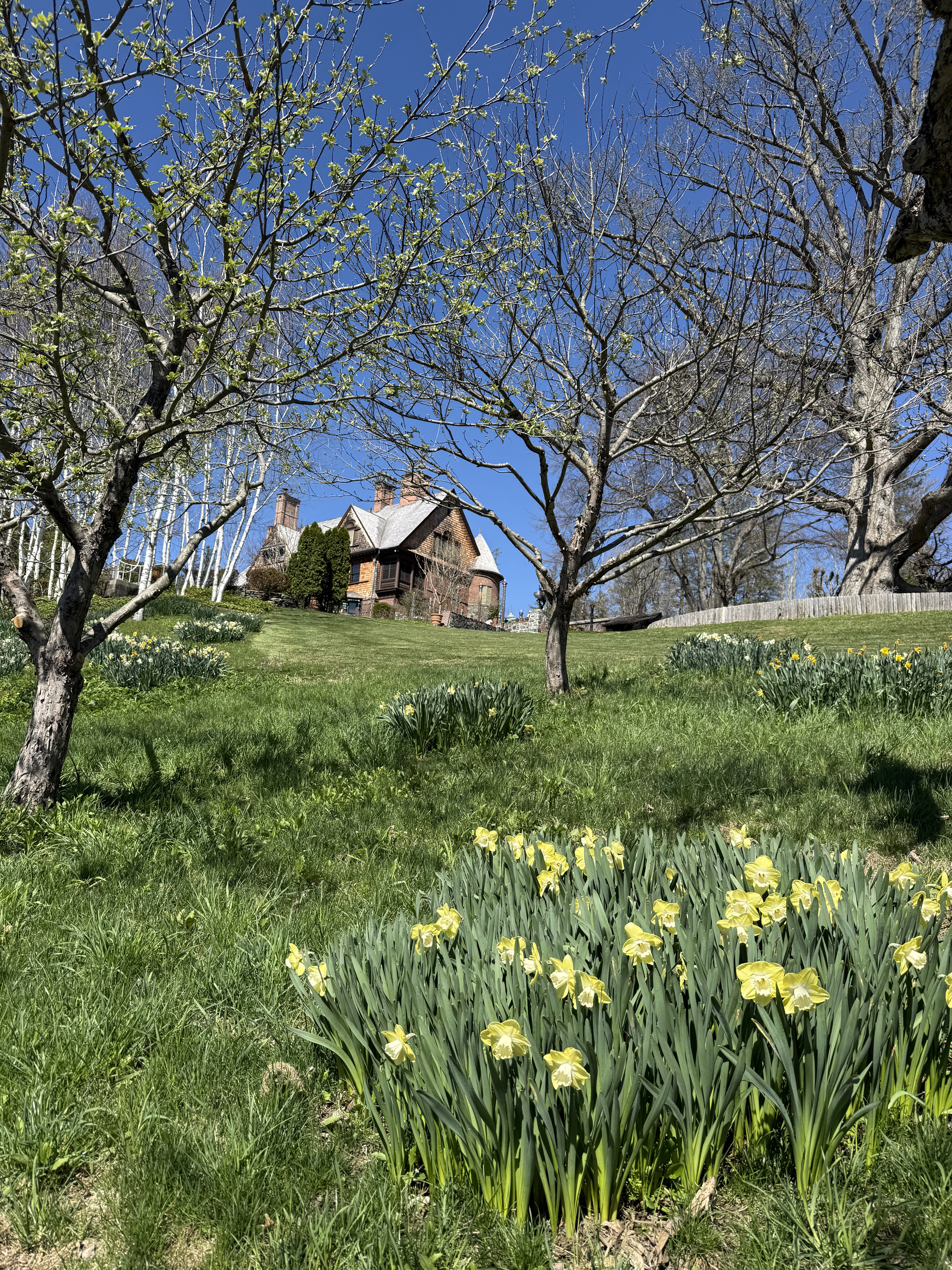
Looking up towards the house

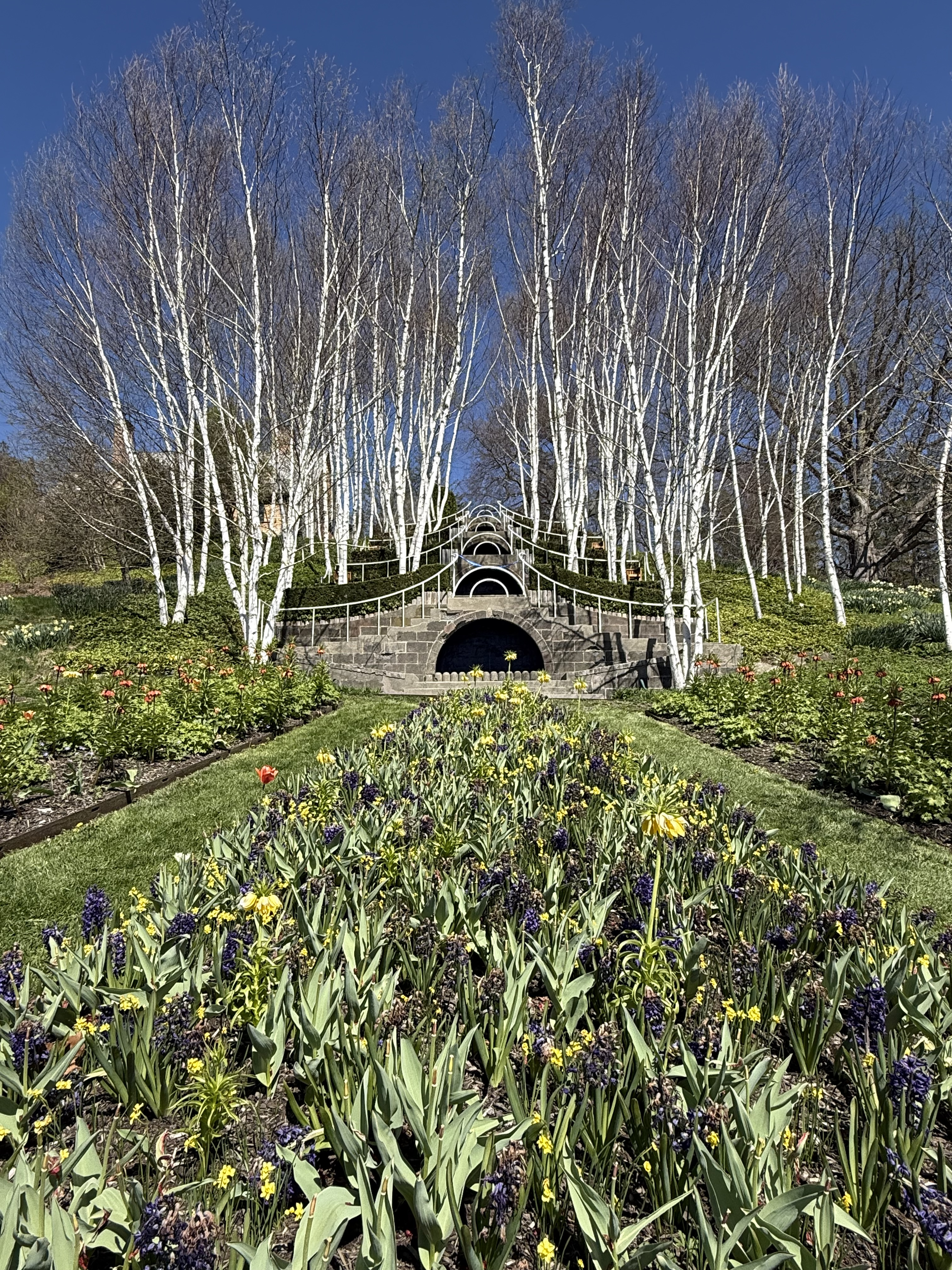
Blue Steps in the spring

== See also ==
- Berkshire Cottages
- Chesterwood (Massachusetts)
- Mission House (Stockbridge, Massachusetts)
- The Trustees of Reservations
- National Register of Historic Places listings in Berkshire County, Massachusetts
- List of National Historic Landmarks in Massachusetts
