= John Sergeant (missionary) =

American missionary

- Born: 1710; Newark, Province of New Jersey
- Died: 27 July 1749 (aged 39); Stockbridge, Province of Massachusetts Bay
- Occupation: Pastor
- Spouse: Abigail Williams

John Sergeant (1710 – July 27, 1749) was an American missionary in Stockbridge, Massachusetts, through whose ministry many Mahicans converted to Christianity. Reverend Sergeant was a graduate of Yale, who became an ordained Puritan minister. He helped establish a day school at what became Stockbridge, and laid the groundwork for a boarding school, before his early death.

== Early life ==
John was born in 1710 to Jonathan and Mary Sergeant, in Newark, New Jersey. His father died while he was still young, and his mother married Colonel John Cooper, who raised him. Due to a farming accident, he was left unable to move his left hand, which consequently led him to seek a career in academia, as opposed to following in the footsteps of his father, and stepfather, as a farmer. He enrolled at Yale in 1725, and graduated as valedictorian in 1729, and his valedictory speech has since been published. In September 1731, he was appointed as a tutor and was described as "one of the most successful holders of that office in the early history of the College", serving through 1735. He earned a second bachelor's degree from Yale, in theology, in 1732, while continuing to serve as a tutor.

== Missionary life ==
=== Establishing the mission ===
In 1734, the Reverend Samuel Hopkins, having heard of Chief Konkapot's well-known good character and disposition towards Christianity, decided to meet with John Stoddard, an authority on the local Native Americans, on the subject of a possible mission to the so-called "River Indians" (the term "River-Indians" in eighteenth century Massachusetts meant the Mohicans who came from the Colony of New York) living near the Housatonic River. With encouragement from Stoddard, he informed the Reverend Stephen Williams, and, together, they asked the Reverend William Williams to write to the Commissioners for Indian Affairs in Boston. The commissioners recommended a trip to consult with the Native Americans there regarding the possibility of a missionary being installed to live among them. When they consented, Jonathan Belcher and the commissioners authorized the mission on August 16, 1734, granting a salary of 100 pounds per year for a minister. Hopkins already had John Sergeant in mind as the ideal candidate, as he had privately expressed that he would rather work among the natives than the English.

In September 1734, Stephen Williams and Nehemiah Bull approached Sergeant at Yale with the proposal. Sergeant agreed, on the condition he could spend half the first year at Yale, to be able to see his students through their final year, and then devote himself entirely. On October 8, he set off for Nehemiah Bull's house, who accompanied him to the settlement, in order to introduce him. They arrived on October 12, and announced their desire for a meeting the following day.

=== Early years ===
John preached his first sermon to about 20 adults. Being that he was not yet ordained, Bull baptized the first native, an interpreter with an already advanced grasp of English and Christianity, afterward called Ebenezer, on October 18. On October 21, they began building a public house, to serve as both a church and school, and it opened November 5. From November 25 through the 30th, John was called away to Albany to visit with the Mohawks, and so Reverend Hopkins enlisted Timothy Woodbridge of Springfield to assist the minister, and oversee the mission in Sergeant's absence. Sergeant left to return to Yale on December 9, bringing the young sons of Captain Konkapot and Lieutenant Umpachanee along with him, for their education. After finishing his work at New Haven, he returned to the mission on July 5, 1735. John was ordained at Deerfield, on August 31, 1735.

Initially, there were two Native American settlements, separated by about eight miles, called Skatehook, to the south, where Lieutenant Umpachanee lived, and Wnahktukook, to the north, where Captain Konkapot lived. This created logistical issues, and John and schoolmaster Timothy Woodbridge had to make trips between the two locations, often swapping places. Governor Belcher therefore proposed to the General Assembly that a township be granted to the mission, so that the entire tribe could live together, and attend the same church and school. This involved swapping lands with those who had already settled the land in question. The township, which was to become Stockbridge, but was then simply called "Indian Town", was granted March 25, 1736 and settled in May. One of the stipulations of the grant was that four new English families would be allowed to settle there.

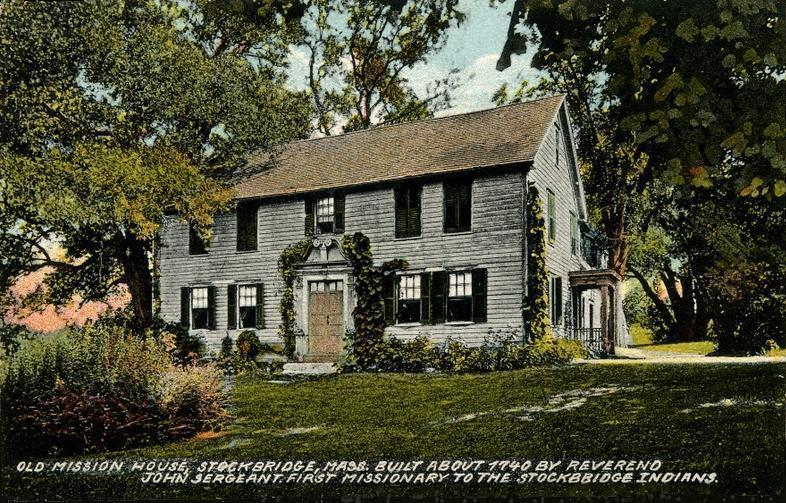
Mission House in ca. 1908 postcard

In January 1737, in order to live among his congregation, John Sergeant came to live with Timothy Woodbridge, who had recently married and built the first permanent house in the town. Sergeant began building his own home, which still stands, in April. On June 22, 1739, the town was officially named Stockbridge, after Stockbridge, Hampshire. In August, the General Court granted funds to build a church and a schoolhouse. John married Abigail Williams, half-sister of Ephraim Williams, the founder of Williams College, on August 16, 1739.

== Death and aftermath ==
In the summer of 1749, Sergeant fell ill with "a slow or nervous fever, attended with canker, and an inflammation in the throat". He died on July 27, 1749, at age 39, after four weeks of illness. The Stockbridge Native Americans displayed their affection for him by gathering for prayers, and, after his passing, mourning their loss. He left behind his wife, Abigail, and 3 young children. The epitaph on his tombstone was said to be composed by one of the local Native Americans:

Where is that pleasing Form, I ask, thou canst not show;
He's not within, false stone, There's nought but Dust below;
And where's that pious soul, that Thinking conscious MIND?
Wilt thou pretend, vain cypher, THAT'S with thee enshrined?
Alas, my Friend's not here with thee that I can find;
Here's not a Sergeant's body or a Sergeant's MIND.
I'll seek him hence, for all's alike Deception here.
I'll go to Heav'n & I shall find my Sergeant there.

Stockbridge went without a resident minister for over two years, with the schoolmaster, Timothy Woodbridge, overseeing the mission. During this time, a feud for control of the town started, between the Woodbridge and the Williams factions. Sergeant was eventually succeeded by the Reverend Jonathan Edwards, who was endorsed by the Woodbridges.

== In popular culture ==
- John Sergeant was the subject of a painting by Norman Rockwell (a resident of Stockbridge), entitled John Sergeant and Chief Konkapot.
- John and Abigail Williams Sergeant and her family are the subjects of the novel, The Prospering (1967, currently out of print) by Elizabeth George Speare, as told by Abigail’s youngest sister.

== Works ==
- The Causes and Danger of Delusions in the Affairs of Religion, Consider'd and Caution'd Against, with Particular Reference to the Temper of the Present Times
- A Letter from the Revd. Mr. Sergeant of Stockbridge, to Dr. Colman of Boston
- A Valedictorian Oration: Delivered at Yale College in the Year 1729
