= Stockbridge, Massachusetts =

- Town
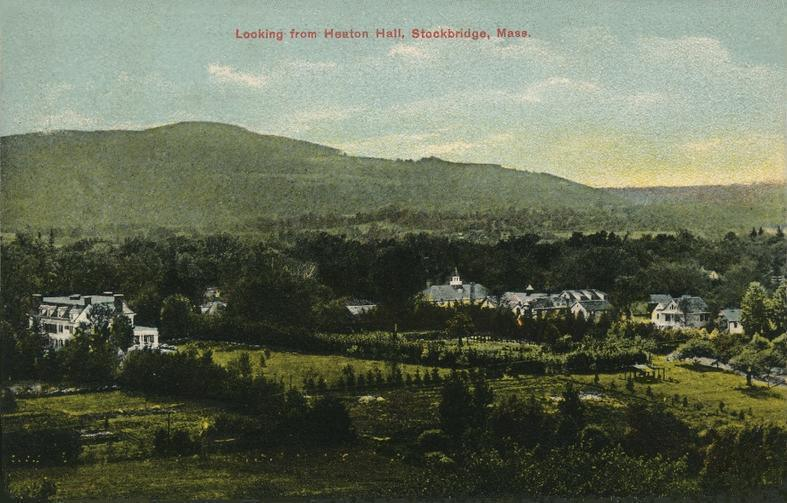

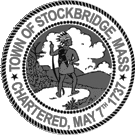
- Seal

- Location in Berkshire County and the state of Massachusetts.
- Coordinates: 42°17′15″N 73°19′15″W
- Country: United States
- State: Massachusetts
- County: Berkshire
- Settled: 1734
- Incorporated: 1739

Government
  - Type: Open town meeting

Area
  - Total: 23.7 sq mi (61.3 km^{2})
  - Land: 22.7 sq mi (58.9 km^{2})
  - Water: 0.93 sq mi (2.4 km^{2})
- Elevation: 843 ft (257 m)

Population (2020)
  - Total: 2,018
  - Density: 88.7/sq mi (34.3/km^{2})
- Time zone: UTC−5 (Eastern)
  - Summer (DST): UTC−4 (Eastern)
- ZIP Codes: 01262 (Stockbridge); 01229 (Glendale); 01236 (Housatonic)
- Area code: 413
- FIPS code: 25-67595
- GNIS feature ID: 0618274
- Website: www.stockbridge-ma.gov

Stockbridge is a town in Berkshire County in Western Massachusetts, United States. It is part of the Pittsfield, Massachusetts, Metropolitan Statistical Area. The population was 2,018 at the 2020 census. A year-round resort area, Stockbridge is home to the Norman Rockwell Museum, Naumkeag, a public garden and historic house, the Austen Riggs Center (a psychiatric treatment center), and Chesterwood, home and studio of sculptor Daniel Chester French.

== History ==
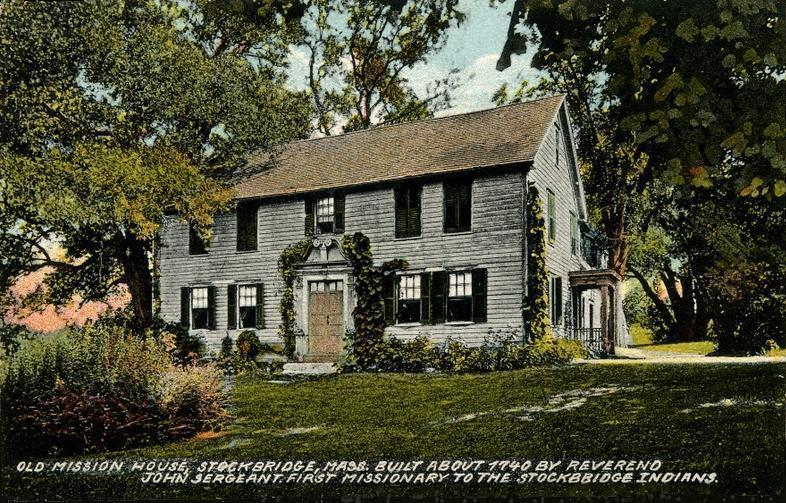
Mission House, built about 1740. Postcard c. 1908.

Stockbridge was settled by British missionaries in 1734, who established it as a praying town for the Stockbridge Indians, an indigenous Mohican tribe. The township was set aside for the tribe by Massachusetts colonists as a reward for their assistance against the French in the French and Indian Wars. The Rev. John Sergeant, from Newark, New Jersey, was their first missionary. Sergeant was succeeded in this post by Jonathan Edwards, a Christian theologian associated with the First Great Awakening.

First chartered as Indian Town in 1737, the village was incorporated on June 22, 1739, as Stockbridge. The missionaries named it after Stockbridge in Hampshire, England. Although the Massachusetts General Court had assured the Stockbridge Indians that their land would never be sold, the agreement was rescinded. Despite the aid by the Tribe to the American Patriots during the Revolutionary War, their lands in Stockbridge were stolen by white townspeople. The Tribe was forced to relocate west, first to New York and then to Wisconsin. The village was taken over by European American settlers.

With the arrival of the railroad in 1850, Stockbridge developed as a summer resort for the wealthy of Boston and other major cities. Many large houses, called Berkshire Cottages, were built in the area before World War I and the advent of the income tax. Stockbridge was home to several cottages, including Naumkeag.

Since 1853, Stockbridge has benefited from the presence of the Laurel Hill Association, a village beautification society. The Stockbridge Bowl Association maintains and preserves the natural beauty of Stockbridge Bowl and the surrounding Bullard Woods.

Stockbridge was the home of Elizabeth Freeman, a freed slave, late in her life. The former slave engaged the attorney Theodore Sedgwick to file a freedom suit on her behalf, based on the statements in the new state constitution in 1780. In the case with a slave named Brom, the county court ruled that they were both free under the constitution. Their case served as precedent to a later case before the State Supreme Court, effectively ending slavery in Massachusetts. Freeman transferred as a free woman to work in the household of Sedgwick, who became a state judge. Also working in the household was Agrippa Hull, a free black veteran of the war, who became the largest black landowner in Stockbridge. Freeman was buried in the Sedgwick family plot at the Stockbridge Cemetery.

Catharine Maria Sedgwick, a daughter of Theodore and his wife, became a renowned 19th-century literary figure. She was born in Stockbridge in 1789. She is the author of six novels, including her most famous, Hope Leslie (1827).

In the Curtisville area, now known as the Interlaken part of Stockbridge, Albrecht Pagenstecher, an immigrant from Saxony, established the first wood-based newsprint paper mill in the United States, in March 1867. Pagenstecher later went on to found "numerous pulp and paper mills throughout the Northeast and Canada" and serve on the board of directors of the International Paper Company.

The town has a tradition as an art colony. The sculptor Daniel Chester French lived and worked at his home and studio called Chesterwood. Norman Rockwell painted many of his works in Stockbridge, which is now home to the Norman Rockwell Museum.

== Geography and climate ==
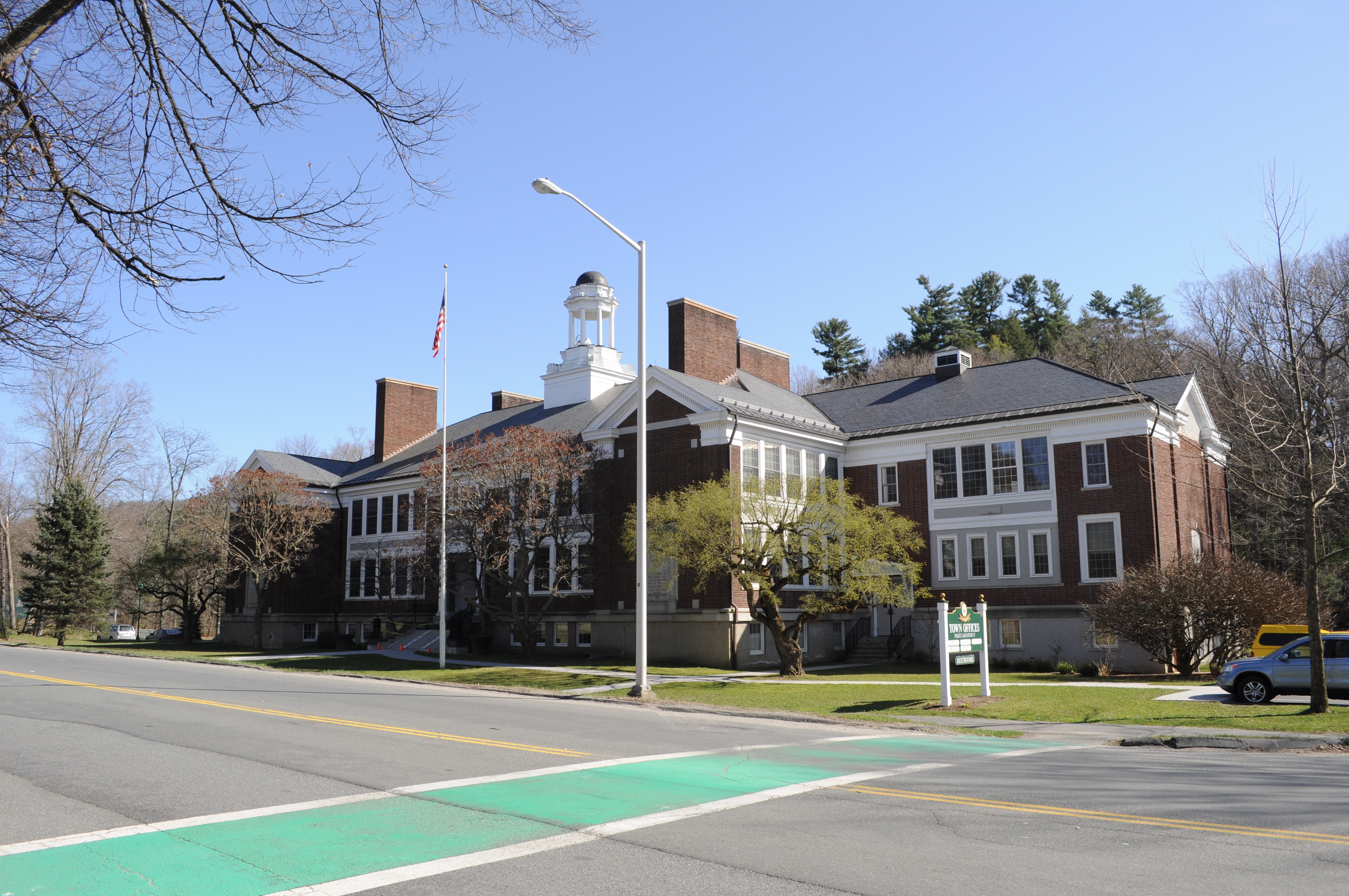
Stockbridge Town Offices in 1914 school building

According to the United States Census Bureau, the town has a total area of 23.7 sq mi (61.3 km^{2}), of which 22.7 sq mi (58.9 km^{2}) is land and 0.93 sq mi (2.4 km^{2}), or 3.97%, is water. Stockbridge is bordered by Richmond to the northwest, Lenox to the north and northeast, Lee to the east, Great Barrington to the south, and West Stockbridge to the west. The town is located 13.5 miles (21.7 km) south of Pittsfield, 35 miles (56 km) southeast of Albany, New York, 45 miles (72 km) west-northwest of Springfield, and 130 miles (210 km) west of Boston.

Set among the Berkshire Mountains, Stockbridge is drained by the Housatonic River, which runs through the center of town. The river is fed by several marshy brooks and lakes, including Mohawk Lake to the west, Agawam Lake to the south, Lake Averic in the northwest, and Lake Mahkeenac, also known as the Stockbridge Bowl, to the north. Stockbridge Bowl is the site of a town beach, a boating club, and a summer camp, Camp Mah-Kee-Nac. North of the bowl lies parts of Tanglewood. To either side of the bowl lie West Stockbridge Mountain and Rattlesnake Hill. To the south, Monument Mountain peaks on the Great Barrington town line, and Beartown Mountain peaks to the east, closer to the Lee town line.

The town is nearly bisected by Interstate 90, the Massachusetts Turnpike. There are exits in neighboring West Stockbridge and Lee. Several state routes, including Route 102, Route 183 and U.S. Route 7 all pass through town, with Routes 102 and 7 sharing a short stretch in downtown Stockbridge, and Routes 102 and 183 meeting in the village of Larrywaug. In this village are the Berkshire Botanical Gardens and the Norman Rockwell Museum. South of there, in the village of Glendale, Massachusetts lies Chesterwood.

The Housatonic Railroad, the main rail line between Pittsfield and Great Barrington, passes through the town and lies mostly on the southern bank of the river. (The rail line is used for freight; there is no passenger service.) The town lies along a Berkshire Regional Transit Authority (BRTA) bus line, which provides service between Pittsfield and Great Barrington. Pittsfield is also the site of the nearest regional bus service, as well as regional Amtrak service. There are local airports (for private and charter planes) in Pittsfield and Great Barrington. The nearest national air service is located at Albany International Airport in New York.

Climate data for Stockbridge, Massachusetts (1981–2010 normals)
Month	Jan	Feb	Mar	Apr	May	Jun	Jul	Aug	Sep	Oct	Nov	Dec	Year
Mean daily maximum °F (°C)	32.5 (0.3)	35.8 (2.1)	45.1 (7.3)	57.6 (14.2)	69.6 (20.9)	77.4 (25.2)	81.3 (27.4)	79.3 (26.3)	71.2 (21.8)	60.1 (15.6)	48.4 (9.1)	36.6 (2.6)	57.9 (14.4)
Mean daily minimum °F (°C)	12.7 (−10.7)	14.3 (−9.8)	23.3 (−4.8)	33.5 (0.8)	43.4 (6.3)	51.8 (11.0)	56.9 (13.8)	55.6 (13.1)	47.6 (8.7)	36.9 (2.7)	29.5 (−1.4)	18.9 (−7.3)	35.4 (1.9)
Average precipitation inches (mm)	3.67 (93)	2.87 (73)	3.82 (97)	3.71 (94)	4.31 (109)	4.02 (102)	4.13 (105)	4.56 (116)	3.93 (100)	3.99 (101)	3.85 (98)	3.74 (95)	46.60 (1,184)
Average snowfall inches (cm)	16.2 (41)	16.1 (41)	11.4 (29)	3.6 (9.1)	.1 (0.25)	0 (0)	0 (0)	0 (0)	0 (0)	0 (0)	4.7 (12)	12.8 (33)	64.9 (165)
Average precipitation days	10	9	11	12	12	11	11	11	10	9	11	10	127

== Demographics ==
Historical population
Year	Pop.	±%
1790	1,336	—
1850	1,941	+45.3%
1860	2,136	+10.0%
1870	2,003	−6.2%
1880	2,357	+17.7%
1890	2,132	−9.5%
1900	2,081	−2.4%
1910	1,933	−7.1%
1920	1,764	−8.7%
1930	1,762	−0.1%
1940	1,815	+3.0%
1950	2,311	+27.3%
1960	2,161	−6.5%
1970	2,312	+7.0%
1980	2,328	+0.7%
1990	2,408	+3.4%
2000	2,276	−5.5%
2010	1,947	−14.5%
2020	2,018	+3.6%
2022*	1,998	−1.0%
* = population estimate. Source: United States census records and Population Estimates Program data.

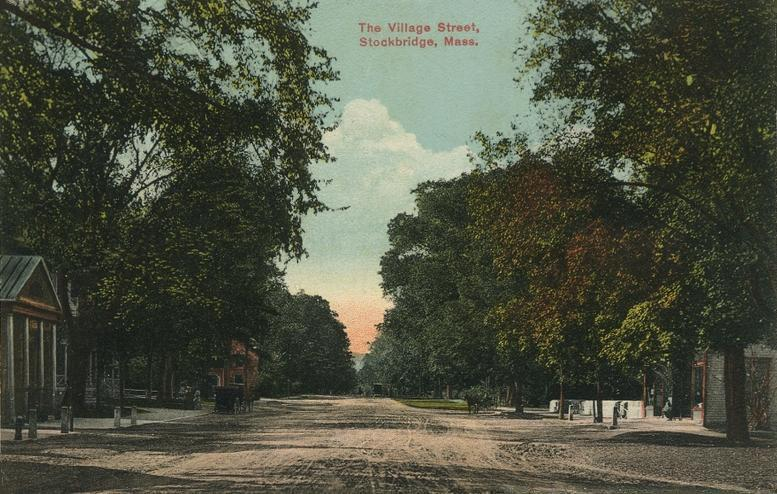
Main Street, around 1910

As of the census of 2000, there were 2,276 people, 991 households, and 567 families residing in the town. By population, Stockbridge ranks twelfth out of the 32 cities and towns in Berkshire County, and 285th out of the 351 cities and towns in Massachusetts. The population density was 99.2 inhabitants per square mile (38.3/km^{2}), which ranks 12th in the county and 281st in the Commonwealth. There were 1,571 housing units at an average density of 68.5 per square mile (26.4/km^{2}). The racial makeup of the town was 96.92% White, 1.23% African American, 0.04% Native American, 0.44% Asian, 0.04% Pacific Islander, 0.97% from other races, and 0.35% from two or more races. Hispanic or Latino of any race were 2.90% of the population.

There were 991 households, out of which 18.9% had children under the age of 18 living with them, 47.4% were married couples living together, 6.9% had a female householder with no husband present, and 42.7% were non-families. Of all households 36.7% were made up of individuals, and 15.1% had someone living alone who was 65 years of age or older. The average household size was 2.06 and the average family size was 2.67.

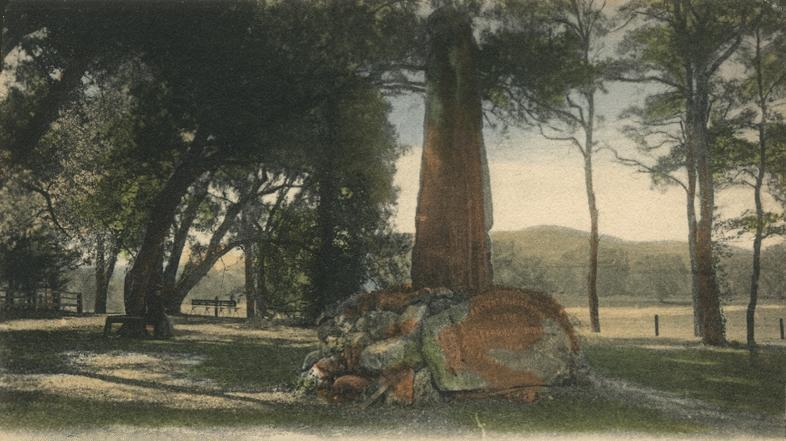
Indian Monument in 1905

In the town, the population was spread out, with 15.2% under the age of 18, 6.3% from 18 to 24, 22.5% from 25 to 44, 33.5% from 45 to 64, and 22.5% who were 65 years of age or older. The median age was 49 years. For every 100 females, there were 91.3 males. For every 100 females age 18 and over, there were 87.5 males.

The median income for a household in the town was $48,571, and the median income for a family was $59,556. Males had a median income of $32,500 versus $27,969 for females. The per capita income for the town was $32,499. About 1.7% of families and 8.5% of the population were below the poverty line, including 1.2% of those under age 18 and 4.1% of those age 65 or over.

== Government ==
Stockbridge is governed by open town meeting, held annually on the third Monday in May, and by an elected three-member Board of Selectmen. The town operates its own police, fire and public works departments, with three fire stations and two post offices. The town's library, located in the central village, is connected to the regional library network. The nearest hospital, Fairview Hospital, is located in neighboring Great Barrington.

On the state level, Stockbridge is represented in the Massachusetts House of Representatives by the Fourth Berkshire district, which covers southern Berkshire County, as well as the westernmost towns in Hampden County. In the Massachusetts Senate, the town is represented by the Berkshire, Hampshire and Franklin district, which includes all of Berkshire County and western Hampshire and Franklin counties. The town is patrolled by the First (Lee) Station of Barracks "B" of the Massachusetts State Police.

On the national level, Stockbridge is represented in the United States House of Representatives as part of Massachusetts's 1st congressional district, and has been represented by Richard Neal of Springfield since January 2013. Massachusetts is currently represented in the United States Senate by senior Senator Elizabeth Warren and junior Senator Ed Markey.

Stockbridge presidential election results
Year	Democratic	Republican	Third parties	Total Votes	Margin
2020	80.63% 1,099	17.39% 237	1.98% 27	1,363	63.24%
2016	74.69% 965	19.50% 252	5.80% 75	1,292	55.19%
2012	78.10% 945	18.68% 226	3.22% 39	1,210	59.42%
2008	80.10% 998	17.17% 214	2.73% 34	1,246	62.92%
2004	78.75% 982	19.81% 247	1.44% 18	1,247	58.94%
2000	63.37% 794	23.30% 292	13.33% 167	1,253	40.06%
1996	68.54% 867	20.87% 264	10.59% 134	1,265	47.67%
1992	63.02% 893	20.18% 286	16.80% 238	1,417	42.84%
1988	66.74% 947	32.21% 457	1.06% 15	1,419	34.53%
1984	54.90% 801	44.21% 645	0.89% 13	1,459	10.69%
1980	39.29% 552	36.94% 519	23.77% 334	1,405	2.35%
1976	48.31% 686	46.55% 661	5.14% 73	1,420	1.76%
1972	50.70% 689	48.20% 655	1.10% 15	1,359	2.50%
1968	49.95% 553	45.53% 504	4.52% 50	1,107	4.43%
1964	73.32% 805	25.87% 284	0.82% 9	1,098	47.45%
1960	46.95% 546	52.45% 610	0.60% 7	1,163	5.50%
1956	28.95% 319	70.78% 780	0.27% 3	1,102	41.83%
1952	29.29% 340	70.46% 818	0.26% 3	1,161	41.17%
1948	31.95% 277	65.28% 566	2.77% 24	867	33.33%
1944	39.21% 338	60.56% 522	0.23% 2	862	21.35%
1940	33.93% 305	65.52% 589	0.56% 5	899	31.59%

== Education ==
The first school in Stockbridge was opened in 1737 under the direction of John Sergeant, a missionary to the local Mohican Indians. It served as a school for the Christian education of Indian children. During the pre-American Revolutionary War years, several small schools were established to serve the children of new settlers scattered further outside the village. The founding of the semi-private Academy after the Revolutionary War marked the beginning of a more structured commitment to secondary education in the town. Three of the four students in the first graduating class of Williams College in 1795 were alumni of the Academy.

In the early and mid-1800s Stockbridge schools earned the distinction of educating three Associate Justices of the Supreme Court of the United States who served on the high court at the same time. All educated in Stockbridge, Stephen Johnson Field, Henry Billings Brown and David Josiah Brewer served together as Associate Justices from 1891 to 1897.

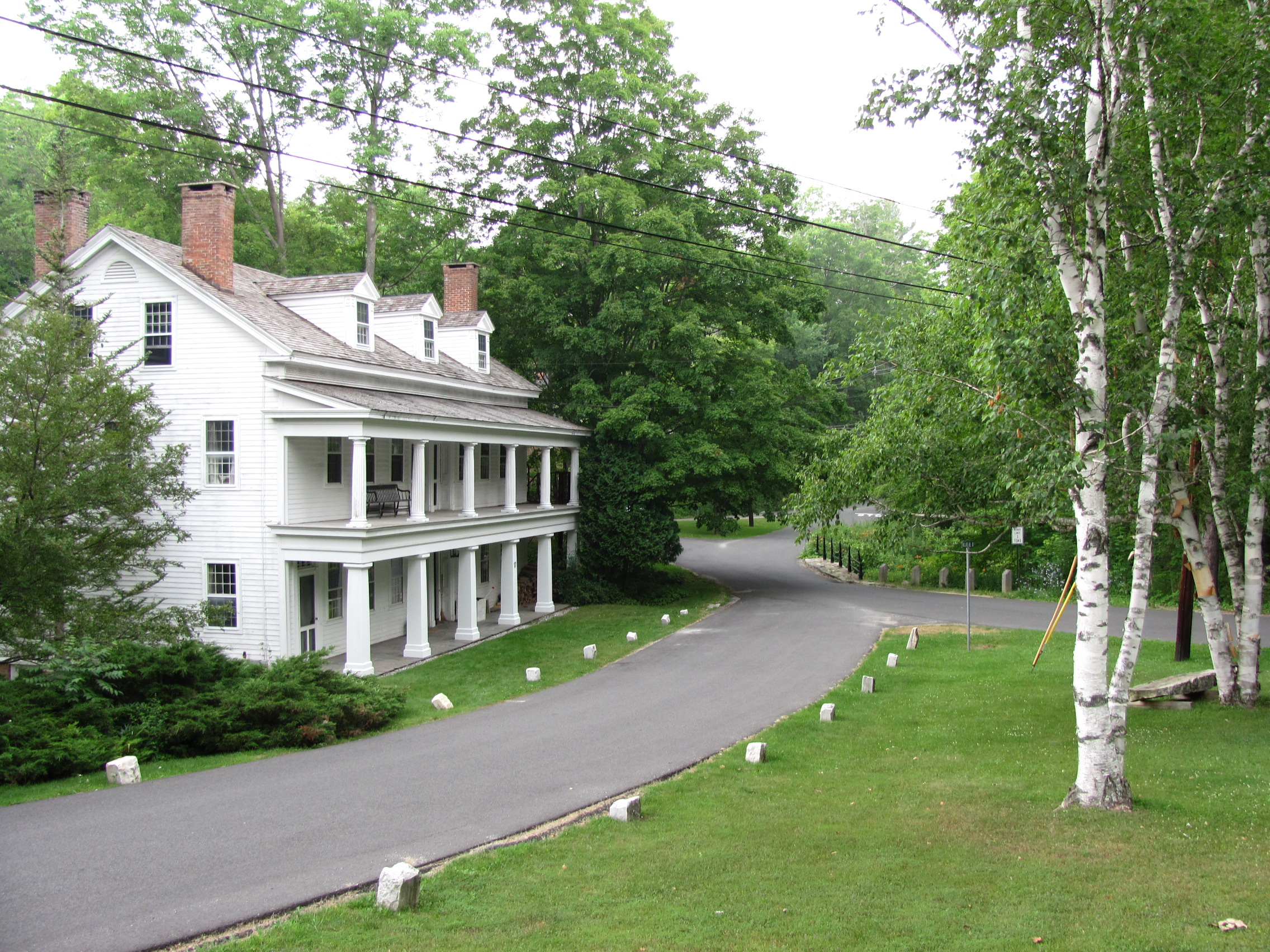
Former Bancroft-Curtisville Hotel in Interlaken, one of Stockbridge's small villages

Students from Stockbridge, its small villages of Interlaken, Glendale and Larrywaug, and from the nearby town of West Stockbridge attended the town's Williams High School, established in 1872. In April 1968 the school closed after nearly a decade of contentious school regionalization debates and failed ballot measures. After the state refused in 1964 to help fund a new high school building, Stockbridge voters approved a regionalization plan to join Great Barrington and West Stockbridge in a consolidated school district. In 1968 Stockbridge students joined those from Great Barrington's Searles High School in transferring to a new regional high school located in Great Barrington.

The building of the former Stockbridge Plain School, completed in 1914, was shared by the elementary school and Williams High School, until the opening of Monument Mountain Regional High School in 1968. Stockbridge Plain School for several years then became one of the elementary schools in the new Berkshire Hills Regional School District. A renovation of the building was completed in 2008, and it now serves as the new town offices.

Today, Stockbridge, along with West Stockbridge and Great Barrington, remain members of the Berkshire Hills Regional School District. All students in the district attend school in Great Barrington, with elementary students attending Muddy Brook Regional Elementary School, middle school students attending Monument Valley Regional Middle School, and high school students attending Monument Mountain Regional High School. In addition to public schools, there are private and religious schools located in the neighboring towns.

The nearest community college is the South County branch of Berkshire Community College in Great Barrington. The nearest state college is Massachusetts College of Liberal Arts in North Adams, and the nearest state university is the University of Massachusetts Amherst. The nearest private college is Williams College in Williamstown. Less than an hour's drive away, in Albany, New York, is a state university, University at Albany, SUNY, and also several private colleges.

== Sites of interest ==
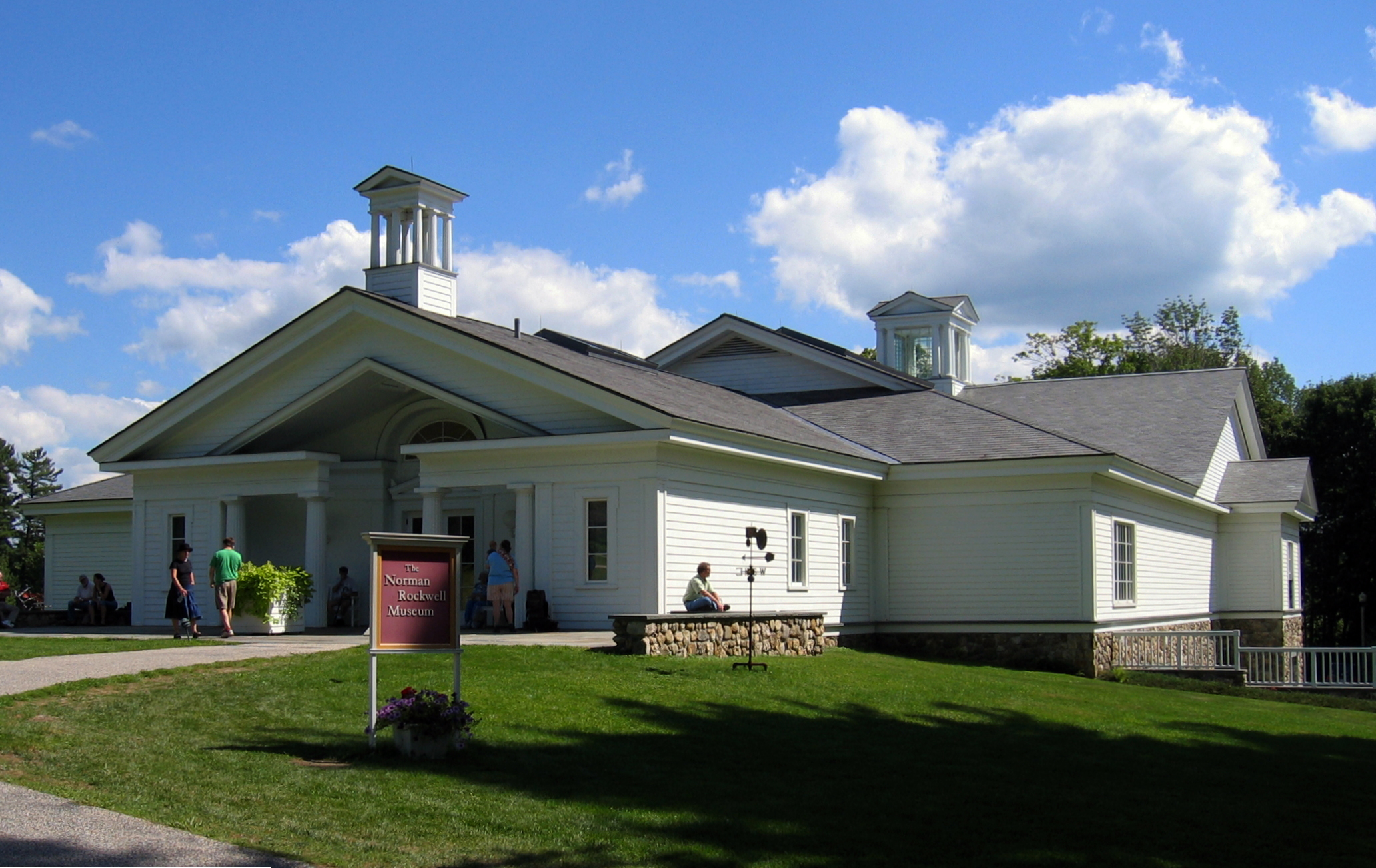
The Norman Rockwell Museum

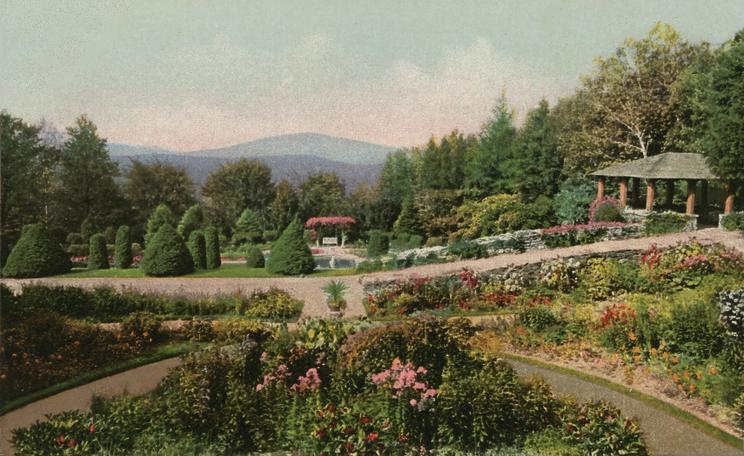
Naumkeag Gardens c. 1908

- Austen Riggs Center, psychiatric hospital
- Berkshire Botanical Garden
- Berkshire Theatre Festival, originally designed by Stanford White as a casino (1888)
- Chesterwood, home of Daniel Chester French
- Curtisville Historic District
- Dudley Field Memorial Tower (Children's Chimes Tower)
- Ice Glen
- Kripalu Center for Yoga and Health
- Merwin House (c. 1825)
- Mission House (c. 1739)
- National Shrine of The Divine Mercy
- Naumkeag Museum & Gardens (1886)
- Norman Rockwell Museum
- Oronoque (1887)
- Red Lion Inn
- Sedgwick Pie, unique family plot at the Stockbridge Cemetery
- Shadow Brook Farm Historic District, summer home of Andrew Carnegie
- Stockbridge Bowl, aka Lake Mahkeenac
- Tanglewood, summer home of the Boston Symphony Orchestra

== Notable people ==
- Kenny Aronoff, drummer
- Ezekiel Bacon, congressman
- John Bacon, congressman
- Barnabas Bidwell, congressman
- Henry Charles Brace, politician
- Alice Brock, artist
- Joseph Choate, ambassador
- Mabel Choate, preservationist
- Tara Conklin, writer
- Henry W. Dwight, congressman
- Joseph Dwight, 18th-century judge
- Jonathan Edwards, 18th-century theologian
- Erik Erikson, psychologist and author
- David Dudley Field I, clergyman
- David Dudley Field II, lawyer, law reformer, congressman
- Cyrus West Field, financier
- Henry Martyn Field, clergyman, author
- Stephen Johnson Field, Associate Justice, Supreme Court of the U.S.
- Elizabeth Freeman (Mum Bett), freed slave
- Daniel Chester French, sculptor
- William Gibson, novelist, playwright
- Teddy Gross, playwright, co-founder of Common Cents & The Penny Harvest
- Arlo Guthrie, songwriter, singer
- Terence Hill, actor
- Agrippa Hull, free black Patriot
- Abby B. Hyde, hymnwriter
- Owen Johnson, writer
- Stanley Loomis, author of four books on French history
- Marcus P. Miller, United States Army brigadier general
- Story Musgrave, physician, astronaut
- Reinhold Niebuhr, theologian
- William J. Obanhein, "Officer Obie"
- Albrecht Pagenstecher, paper industry pioneer
- Arthur Penn, movie and theatre director
- Benjamin Pond, congressman from New York (1811–1813)
- Norman Rockwell, artist
- Theodore Sedgwick, congressman
- George Seeley, photographer
- John Sergeant, missionary
- Gene Shalit, writer, film critic
- Gertrude Robinson Smith, arts patron, a founder of Tanglewood
- Joan Kennedy Taylor, writer, editor
- Allen T. Treadway, congressman
- Ephraim Williams, benefactor of Williams College
- Samuel Walter Woodward, department store founder
- Enoch Woodbridge, Chief Justice of the Vermont Supreme Court

== In popular culture ==
Stockbridge was the location of Alice's Restaurant in the song of the same name by Arlo Guthrie which describes the town as having "three stop signs, two police officers, and one police car". The site of the restaurant is marked on the street; the site of Alice's home is now the community Guthrie Center. A "red VW microbus" is parked outside, and may be the original.

Stockbridge is mentioned in one verse of James Taylor's "Sweet Baby James".

The last movement of Charles Ives' "Three Places in New England" takes place on the Housatonic River in Stockbridge.

Prospect St, Stockbridge is the first overpass seen in the ending credits of Good Will Hunting.
