= Joseph S. Clark Jr. =

American politician, lawyer, and author

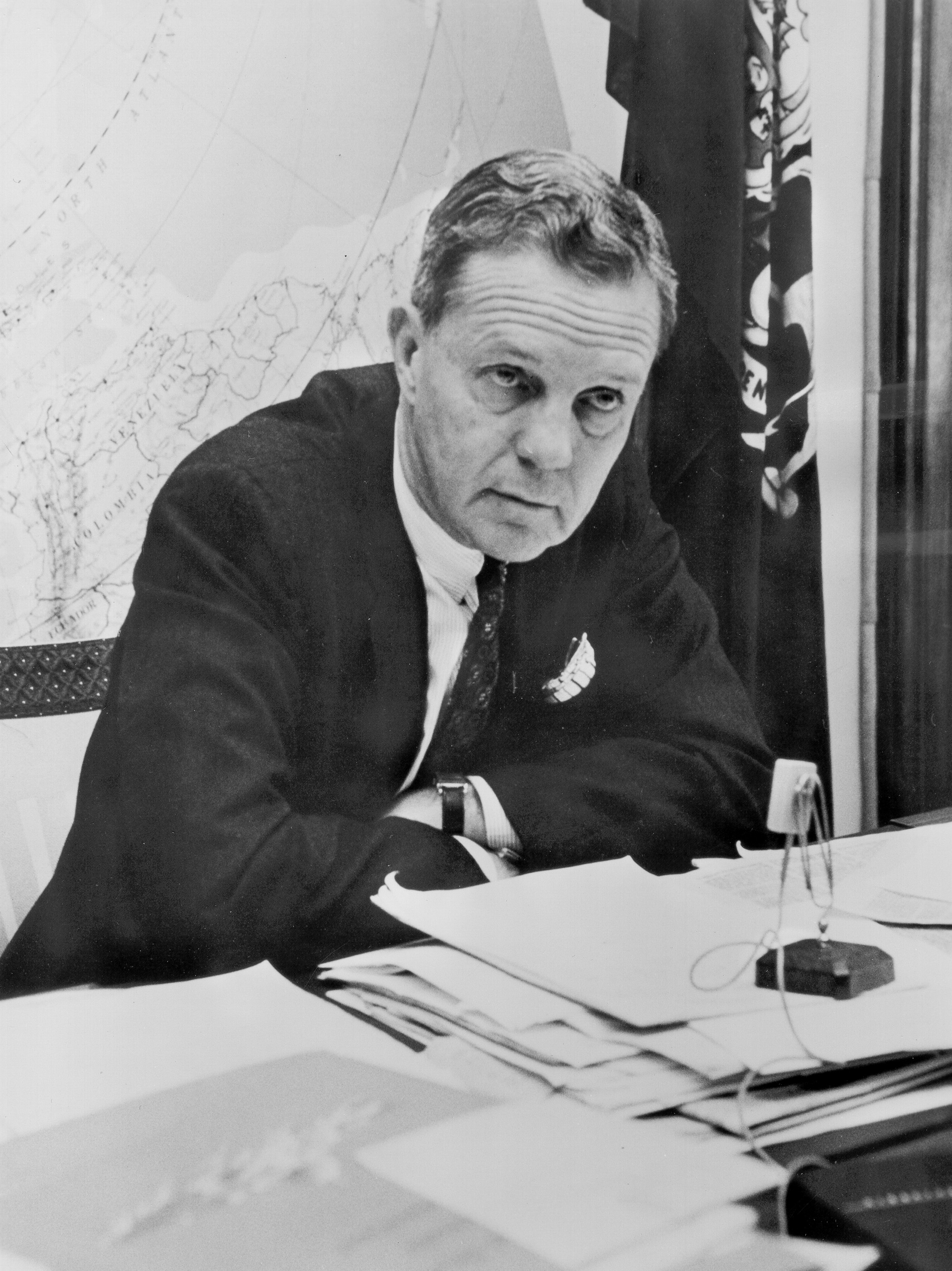

United States Senator from Pennsylvania
- In office January 3, 1957 – January 3, 1969
- Preceded by: James Duff
- Succeeded by: Richard Schweiker

90th Mayor of Philadelphia
- In office January 7, 1952 – January 2, 1956
- Preceded by: Bernard Samuel
- Succeeded by: Richardson Dilworth

Personal details
- Born: Joseph Sill Clark Jr. October 21, 1901 Philadelphia, Pennsylvania, U.S.
- Died: January 12, 1990 (aged 88) Philadelphia, Pennsylvania, U.S.
- Party: Democratic
- Other political affiliations: Republican (until 1928)
- Education: Harvard University (BS); University of Pennsylvania (LLB)
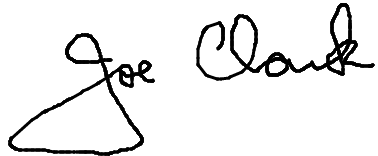
- Signature

Military service
- Allegiance: United States of America
- Branch/service: United States Army Air Forces
- Years of service: 1941 – 1945
- Rank: Colonel
- Battles/wars: World War II

Joseph Sill Clark Jr. (October 21, 1901 – January 12, 1990) was an American writer, lawyer, and politician. A member of the Democratic Party, he served as the 90th mayor of Philadelphia from 1952 to 1956 and as a United States senator from Pennsylvania from 1957 to 1969. Clark was the only Unitarian Universalist elected to a major office in Pennsylvania in the modern era.

The son of attorney and tennis player Joseph Sill Clark Sr., Clark pursued a legal career in Philadelphia after graduating from the University of Pennsylvania Law School. He became involved in a reform movement that sought to break the power of the city's Republican political machine. After serving in the United States Army Air Forces during World War II, Clark won election as city controller in 1949. In this capacity, he investigated and publicized scandals in the city government. In 1951, Clark won election as Mayor of Philadelphia, becoming the first Democrat to do so since 1884. As mayor, he sought to reduce corruption in city government and created low-income housing projects.

After one term as mayor, Clark narrowly defeated incumbent Republican senator James H. Duff in the 1956 Senate election. Clark earned a reputation as a strong supporter of civil rights and worked to appoint liberal committee members from his perch on the Democratic Steering Committee. Clark narrowly won re-election in 1962 but was defeated in 1968 by Congressman Richard Schweiker. His defeat is generally credited to his support of gun control and opposition to the Vietnam War. After leaving office, Clark became a professor at Temple University.

== Early life and education ==
One of two children, Joseph Clark was born in Philadelphia to Joseph Sill Clark Sr. and Kate Richardson Avery. His father, a longtime lawyer in the Germantown section of the city, was also a national tennis champion who won the 1885 U.S. National Championship in doubles with Dick Sears. His mother, whose family owned Avery Island in Louisiana, was the niece of Edmund McIlhenny, the inventor of Tabasco sauce. Clark was raised in the Chestnut Hill section of Philadelphia, and received his early education at Chestnut Hill Academy. He then attended Middlesex School in Concord, Massachusetts, where he played on the school's baseball and football teams. He graduated from Middlesex in 1919 as class valedictorian.

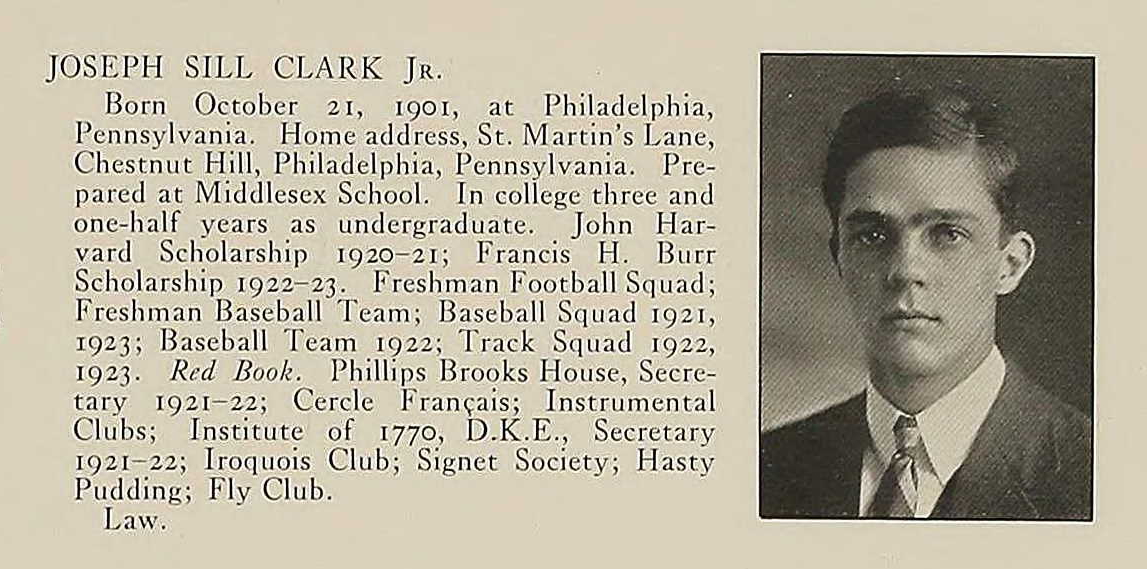
Clark in the Harvard University yearbook, 1923

Clark studied at Harvard University, where he was a member of the baseball and track teams. He won several prizes, including the John Harvard scholarship for high academic distinction. He was elected to Phi Beta Kappa and graduated magna cum laude in 1923 with a Bachelor of Science degree in government, history and economics. Clark, who had spent time at the Bar B C Dude Ranch in Jackson Hole, Wyoming, became a partner in the nearby Double Diamond Dude Ranch in 1924. He later returned to Philadelphia and enrolled at the University of Pennsylvania Law School, where he was a member of St. Anthony Hall and editor of the Law Review. He earned his Bachelor of Laws degree in 1926.

== Early career ==
In December 1926, Clark was admitted to the bar and became an associate with his father's law firm of Clark, Clark, McCarthy and Wagner. That same year, he made his first entry into politics when he unsuccessfully ran as a progressive candidate for Republican committeeman. In 1928, he left the Republican Party and became a Democrat, supporting Al Smith in that year's presidential election.

During the 1928 election, Clark founded the Democratic Warriors Club with Richardson Dilworth, beginning a long political partnership between the two. Both men became active in the reform movement to end corruption in city government, which was long controlled by a Republican machine. Clark was an unsuccessful candidate for the Philadelphia City Council in 1933, with Dilworth serving as his campaign manager. The following year, he joined the firm of Dechert, Bok, Smith and Clark, and continued to practice law for seven years. He managed Dilworth's unsuccessful campaign for the Pennsylvania State Senate in 1934. From 1934 to 1935, he served as Deputy Attorney General of Pennsylvania. In this capacity, he engaged in trial work related to the closing of banks.

In August 1941, Clark enlisted in the United States Army Air Forces (AAF) and was assigned as a captain in the Officers' Reserve Corps Headquarters at Washington, D.C. He later became director of the Organizational Planning Headquarters with the AAF. Following the entry of the United States into World War II, he was transferred to the China Burma India Theater as deputy chief of staff to General George E. Stratemeyer. He briefly served as acting chief of staff to General Stratemeyer, and attained the rank of colonel on October 15, 1943. He was awarded the Bronze Star Medal, Legion of Merit, and Military Order of the British Empire. Returning to the United States in September 1945, he accompanied General Stratemeyer to Washington, D.C., where he helped design plans to defend the nation against air raids.

Following his return to Philadelphia, Clark resumed his political activity and his partnership with Dilworth. He was manager of Dilworth's unsuccessful campaign for Mayor of Philadelphia against Republican incumbent Bernard Samuel in 1947. He then served as chairman of the citizens' committee for President Harry S. Truman in the 1948 election, and as chairman of the Philadelphia chapter of the Americans for Democratic Action from 1948 to 1949. Running as a reform Democrat, Clark was elected city controller in 1949, winning by more than 100,000 votes. Meanwhile, Dilworth was elected city treasurer by a similar margin. Serving from 1950 to 1952, Clark investigated and publicized scandals within the Republican-controlled city government, including the embezzlement of tax money and court funds, imprisonment of the fire marshal, falsification of records, and corruption in the water bureau. Many officials were impeached or indicted as a result, and nine even committed suicide.

== Mayor of Philadelphia ==
Clark announced his candidacy for mayor of Philadelphia in May 1951. Democratic leaders had wanted Dilworth to run, but Clark released a press statement declaring his "irrevocable decision to run for mayor." Instead, Dilworth successfully ran for District Attorney of Philadelphia. Running on his record as city controller, Clark often used a broom while campaigning as a symbol of his pledge to "sweep out" corruption. His Republican challenger was Daniel A. Poling, a Baptist clergyman and editor of the Christian Herald. Clark was endorsed by several labor unions, Americans for Democratic Action, and The Philadelphia Inquirer. On November 6, 1951, he defeated Poling by 124,700 votes. With his victory, Clark became the first Democrat to be elected mayor of Philadelphia since 1884; as of 2025, no member of another party has since held the office.

Clark was inaugurated as the 90th Mayor of Philadelphia on January 7, 1952. He was the first mayor to serve under Philadelphia's Home Rule Charter, which had reorganized city government by merging Philadelphia's city and county offices, establishing a limit of two successive terms for mayor, replacing patronage with a merit system for civil servants, and giving the mayor increased administrative, legislative, and investigative powers. During his administration, he reduced corruption within the Police Department and appointed several African Americans to city jobs. He adopted a $20 million tax increase and established a pay-as-you-go system. He created low-income housing projects, also establishing the position of housing coordinator. He also refused to accept personal gifts. His tenure also saw the transformation of the Penn Center and the Philadelphia waterfront.

In 1952, Clark launched a television series Tell It To the Mayor in which he and other city officials answered questions about his administration. He endorsed Senator Estes Kefauver for the Democratic nomination in the 1952 presidential election. In 1955, he chartered the Food Distribution Center Corporation to create a new food market, and established the Urban Traffic and Transportation Board to design a mass transit system.

In 1956, Clark became the first politician to receive the Philadelphia Award for promoting good governance in the city.

Clark, who had promised to serve as mayor for only one term, did not run for reelection. As of 2021, only one other person has since served just one term as mayor: William J. Green III, who was elected in 1979.

A 1993 survey of historians, political scientists and urban experts conducted by Melvin G. Holli of the University of Illinois at Chicago ranked Clark as the twenty-second-best American big-city mayor to have served between the years 1820 and 1993.

== U.S. Senate ==
Clark announced his candidacy for the United States Senate in 1956. After winning the Democratic nomination over the opposition of Philadelphia's party leaders, he faced first-term Republican incumbent James H. Duff, a popular former governor, in the general election. During the campaign, Clark ran on a liberal platform which included support for increasing the federal minimum wage, expanding Social Security, and repealing the Taft–Hartley Act. He also criticized President Dwight D. Eisenhower on international and domestic matters, and attacked Senator Duff's poor attendance record. On November 6, 1956, Clark narrowly defeated Duff by a margin of 50.1%-49.7%, winning by less than 18,000 out of 4.5 million votes cast. At the same time in the presidential election, President Eisenhower, who by this time claimed his farm in Gettysburg as his permanent address, carried Pennsylvania by well over 600,000 votes.

During his early tenure in the Senate, Clark earned a reputation as a strong supporter of civil rights and congressional reform. He sponsored the Manpower Development and Training Act and the Area Redevelopment Act. He often clashed with Lyndon B. Johnson while the latter was Senate Majority Leader. In 1962, Clark was re-elected to a second term after narrowly defeating Congressman James E. Van Zandt by a 51%-49% margin.

Clark was appointed to the Democratic Steering Committee in 1963, but conservative Southern Democrats thwarted his efforts to appoint more liberal Senators to committees. He was a critic of the Senate itself, which he called a "self-perpetuating oligarchy" in a 1963 address on the Senate floor. He challenged the seniority system and the filibuster. In 1964, he endorsed Genevieve Blatt, the state Secretary of Internal Affairs, over Judge Michael Musmanno in the Democratic senatorial primary. Clark's opposition to Musmanno was not well received by the Italian American community, who largely voted against Clark in 1968. A member of the Senate Foreign Relations Committee, he voted for the Gulf of Tonkin Resolution in 1964 but soon became an outspoken opponent of the Vietnam War, condemning the war's escalation in 1965.

In 1968, Clark was defeated for re-election to a third term by Congressman Richard Schweiker, losing 52% to 46%. His defeat is generally ascribed to his support of gun control, especially the 1968 Gun Control Act, and opposition to the Vietnam War. His campaign chairman in 1968 was Bucks County author James A. Michener.

== Later life and death ==
Following his departure from the Senate, Clark served as a professor at Temple University in 1969. He was president of World Federalists U.S.A., an organization promoting the creation of a world government, from 1969 to 1971. He also served as chairman of the Coalition on National Priorities and Military Policy, and continued to attend meetings of Members of Congress for Peace Through Law. A strong opponent of Mayor Frank Rizzo, he supported Bill Green III in the 1971 Democratic primary and then Republican W. Thacher Longstreth in the general election. He was chairman of independent candidate Charles Bowser's campaign in 1975. He was an elected member of both the American Academy of Arts and Sciences and the American Philosophical Society.

Clark died at his home in Chestnut Hill, at age 88. His remains were cremated.

== Personal life and family ==
Joseph Clark was descended from a prominent financial family in Philadelphia. His great-grandfather, Enoch White Clark, was the founder of E. W. Clark & Co. Enoch's son Edward was Clark's paternal grandfather and brother of Clarence Howard Clark Sr. Clarence Sr.'s son Clarence Jr. served as president of the Centennial National Bank. Clark was the nephew of Edward Walter Clark Jr., commodore of the Philadelphia Corinthian Yacht Club and father of Edward III; Clarence Munroe Clark, a noted tennis player like his brother; and Percy Clark, a lawyer and noted cricketer. Percy's daughter Mary was married to Nelson Rockefeller from 1930 to 1962, before he served as Vice President of the United States.

Clark's paternal grandmother was the daughter of Joseph and Jane (née Todhunter) Sill, who were social reformers and leaders in antebellum Philadelphia's benevolence movement. Joseph Sill served as secretary, vice president, and president of the St. George Society of Philadelphia, an aid organization for English immigrants.

Clark was married three times and had two children. He and his first wife, Elizabeth Story Jenks, had one son, Joseph S. Clark III. He was married to his second wife, Noel Hall, from April 1935 until their divorce in September 1967. He and Noel had one daughter, Noel Clairborne Clark. Two weeks after his divorce, Clark married Iris Cole Richey, a former editor of the Pennsylvania Manual, to whom he remained married until his death.

== Writings ==
- The Senate Establishment (1963)
- Congress: The Sapless Branch (1964)

Political offices
Preceded by Bernard Samuel	Mayor of Philadelphia; 1952–1956	Succeeded by Richardson Dilworth
U.S. Senate
Preceded by James Duff	U.S. senator (Class 3) from Pennsylvania; 1957–1969; Served alongside: Edward Martin, Hugh Scott	Succeeded by Richard Schweiker
Party political offices
Preceded by Richardson Dilworth	Democratic nominee for Mayor of Philadelphia; 1951	Succeeded by Richardson Dilworth
Preceded by Francis Myers	Democratic nominee for U.S. Senator from Pennsylvania (Class 3); 1956, 1962, 1968	Succeeded by Pete Flaherty
