= J. Hinckley Clark =

Joseph Hinckley Clark
- Born: September 7, 1837; Philadelphia, Pennsylvania
- Died: November 27, 1889 (aged 52); Philadelphia, Pennsylvania
- Military career
- Allegiance: United States of America
- Branch: U.S. Army (Union Army)
- Service years: 1861–1865
- Rank: Captain
- Units: 6th Pennsylvania Cavalry (Companies F, D and M)
- Conflicts: American Civil War: Seven Days Battles; Battle of Antietam; Battle of Fredericksburg; Battle of Chancellorsville; Battle of Brandy Station; Battle of Gettysburg; Battle of Bristoe Station; Battle of Cold Harbor; Battle of Trevilian Station; Siege of Petersburg; Battle of Five Forks; Battle of Sayler's Creek
- Awards: Brevet Major, U.S. Volunteers (March 13, 1865)

Joseph Hinckley Clark (September 7, 1837 – November 27, 1889) was a member of the Clark banking family of Philadelphia, Pennsylvania; an officer in the 6th Pennsylvania Cavalry who distinguished himself in combat during the American Civil War; and a director of the Lake Superior and Mississippi Railroad.

== Formative years ==
Born in Philadelphia, Clark was one of four sons of Enoch White Clark (1802–1856), who founded the financial firm E. W. Clark & Co. in Philadelphia in 1837. By mid-century, Enoch Clark had become one of the city's 25 millionaires, launching his family into social prominence.

J. Hinckley Clark joined or participated in several organizations of the Philadelphia elite. He graduated from Harvard University in 1856. In 1859, he was elected a member of the Academy of Natural Sciences of Philadelphia.

== Civil War ==
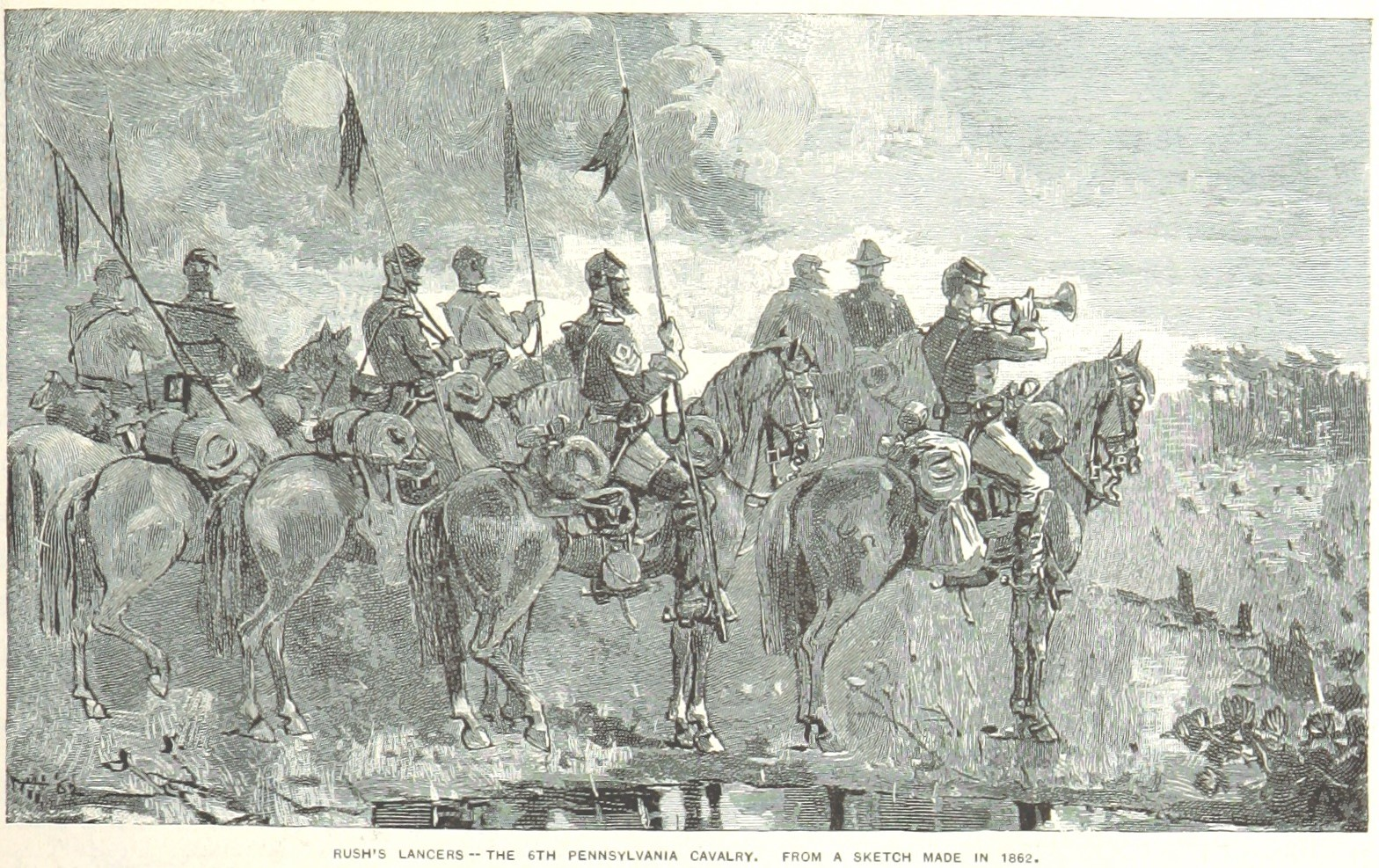
6th Pennsylvania Cavalry, c. 1862.

Upon the outbreak of the Civil War, Clark hastened to fight for the Union side. He joined the Commonwealth Artillery as a private in the spring of 1861, then accepted a commission in the 6th Pennsylvania Cavalry, another organization of the elite and one that distinguished itself in battle. ("The Sixth Pennsylvania Cavalry, also known as Rush’s Lancers, was a completely volunteer unit and one of the finest regiments to serve in the Civil War. Tracing their history from George Washington’s personal body guard during the Revolutionary War, many of the men of the Sixth Pennsylvania were the cream of Philadelphia society...," wrote historian Eric J. Wittenberg.) Clark was mustered in on October 4, 1861, as Second Lieutenant of Company F. The following April 19, he was promoted to First Lieutenant of Company K, and then on March 16, 1863, to Captain of Company M. He led his unit in combat at the Battle of Gettysburg. Later, he and his men fought at the Battle of Trevilian Station (June 11–12, 1864), where on the first day they helped "to drive the rebels from the railway cut and a brick kiln, behind which they had entrenched themselves." On the second day of the battle, Clark was taken "seriously ill", and relinquished command of his unit to Captain (and future famed architect) Frank Furness, whose actions that day were years later recognized with the Medal of Honor. Clark was transferred to Company C on September 18, 1864, and mustered out the following day. On March 13, 1865, he was brevetted a major of the U.S. Volunteers "for gallant and meritorious services at the battle of Gettysburg" and lieutenant colonel "for gallant and meritorious services in the campaign from the Rapidan to the James."

== Post-war life ==
After the war, Clark worked in the family firm alongside his brothers Edward W. Clark, Clarence H. Clark, and Frank Hamilton Clark.

In 1869, he was a director of the Lake Superior and Mississippi Railroad. At the urging of Jay Cooke, a former E.W. Clark partner whose own company controlled the railroad, he joined Jay's brother Pitt Cooke; Philadelphia, Wilmington, and Baltimore Railroad president Isaac Hinckley; writer John Townsend Trowbridge and 31 others on a publicity trip to Duluth, Minnesota, to extol the virtues of the new "Chicago on Lake Superior" and the railroad that served it.

In 1873, Clark became a partner in E. W. Clark & Co.

== Death and interment ==
Clark died in Philadelphia on November 27, 1889. He was buried at the cemetery in The Woodlands (Philadelphia) on November 30, 1889.
