= E. W. Clark =

E. W. Clark may refer to:

- Edward Walter Clark (1858–1946), commodore of the Philadelphia Corinthian Yacht Club and senior partner in E. W. Clark & Co.
- Enoch White Clark (1802–1856), founder of E.W. Clark & Co.
- Edwin W. Clark (1830-?), American Baptist missionary to Nagaland
