= Enoch White Clark =

American banker

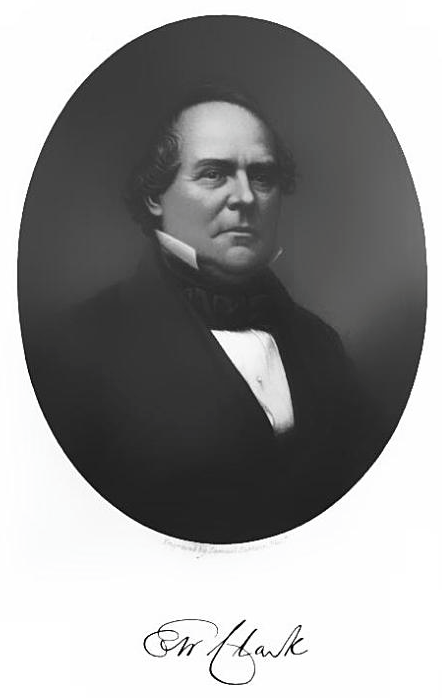
- Banker, founder of E.W. Clark & Co., and one of the richest men in Philadelphia at his death
- Born: November 16, 1802; Easthampton, Massachusetts, US
- Died: August 4, 1856 (aged 53); Philadelphia, Pennsylvania, US
- Known for: founder of E. W. Clark & Co.
- Spouse: Sarah Crawford Dodge
- Children: Edward White Clark; Sarah Crawford Clark; Clarence Howard Clark, Sr. J. Hinckley Clark; Frank Hamilton Clark; Sarah Crawford Clark; Mary White Clark

Enoch White Clark (November 16, 1802 – August 4, 1856) was the founder of E. W. Clark & Co., a prominent financial firm based in Philadelphia, Pennsylvania, that helped the U.S. government finance the Mexican–American War. In 1857, Clark was listed as one of Philadelphia's 25 millionaires.

Clark also launched the financial career of Jay Cooke, who helped finance the Union's war effort in the Civil War and establish a true national currency.

== Biography ==
Clark was born in November 16, 1802, in Easthampton, Massachusetts, a descendant of Captain William Clark (1609–1690), who emigrated from England aboard the ship Mary and John and landed at Plymouth, Massachusetts, in 1630, and moved to the town of Easthampton in 1639. Enoch traced his descent from William as follows: John (1651-1704), John (1679-1768), Eliakim (1707-1781), Lt. Asahel (1737-1822), to his father, Bohan (1772-1846), a merchant and miller who married Mary White (1777-?) on February 11, 1802.

Enoch Clark got his start in finance by working as an office boy at S. & M. Allen & Company, a prominent Philadelphia bank. In 1823, he was made a partner of a new branch of the bank in Providence, Rhode Island. On February 1, 1826, Clark married Sarah Crawford Dodge (1806-1878), a daughter of Nehemiah Dodge. (After she died, her son Edward White Clark commissioned a stained-glass window in her memory in the First Unitarian Church of Philadelphia.)

In 1832, Clark launched his own bank in Boston, Massachusetts; it failed four years later, whereupon he headed back to Philadelphia.

In 1837, he created the E. W. Clark & Co. financial house with his two brothers, Luther Clapp Clark (July 4, 1815 - 1877) and Joseph Washington Clark (1810-1892); and brother-in-law, Edward Dodge. It was described as a "general banking, commission, and exchange business."

Clark's Philadelphia firm did well, earning enough to pay off his debts in seven years, then to propel the Clarks to a place among the city's wealthiest families. The firm opened branches in New York City, St. Louis, New Orleans, and Burlington, Iowa, and made considerable money performing domestic exchanges in the wake of the 1836 revocation of the charter of the Second Bank of the United States and the Panic of 1837. Moody's magazine, a monthly publication of the Moody's credit rating agency, later wrote:

During the first ten years of its development the firm gained wide recognition and public confidence, owing to the indomitable energy of Enoch W. Clark. The drafts of this house drawn between the various branches, were regarded as the very best circulating medium in the West. There were more than $2,000,000 worth of these drafts in circulation within a short time after the establishment of the western branch offices and they were considered everywhere as the equivalent of gold.

Along the way, Clark hired a clerk who would one day shape the American financial system: 16-year-old Jay Cooke of Sandusky, Ohio. "Enoch W. Clark liked the boy's looks and he gave him a job. Cooke was assigned to the clerical department where his devotion to his work and his exceptional abilities in financial matters caused Mr. Clark to push him along," a 1914 history of the firm recounted.

At the outbreak of the Mexican–American War (1846–1848), the U.S. government borrowed about $50 million (about $1,791,666,667 today) from the firm, then recognized as "the leading domestic exchange house" in the country.

In 1849, Enoch's oldest son, Edward White Clark, became a member of the firm. That same year, Cooke was made a partner. (Cooke retired from the firm in 1854, and went on to help to sell the bonds that financed the U.S. Civil War and push the cash-strapped American government to form a true national currency.)

Enoch Clark "withdrew from the really active management" of his firm in 1850. He died on August 4, 1856, of nicotine poisoning.

== Family ==
Enoch W. Clark was the patriarch of a family that gained much prominence in Philadelphia and national affairs. He married Sarah Crawford Dodge. Together they had at least four sons and three daughters:

1 Edward White Clark (1828–1904). Financier whose children included Edward Walter Clark II, Joseph Sill Clark, Sr., and Percy Hamilton Clark. Their descendants included Edward Walter Clark III, Joseph Sill Clark, Jr., Mary Todhunter "Tod" Clark, Rodman Rockefeller, Steven Clark Rockefeller, and Michael Clark Rockefeller.
2 Sarah Crawford Clark (1832-1835). Buried in North Burial Ground in Providence, Rhode Island.
3 Clarence Howard Clark, Sr. (1833–1906). Financier and developer whose children included Clarence Howard Clark, Jr.
4 J. Hinckley Clark (ca. 1835-1889). Became partner in E.W. Clark & Co. in 1872.
5 Frank Hamilton Clark (1844-1882). Banker, president of the Lake Superior and Mississippi Railroad.
6 Sarah Crawford Clark (?-?) whose descendants included Clarence Clark Zantzinger and Gei Zantzinger.
7 Mary White Clark (Sept. 6, 1842-1926): Married John Appleton Burnham (?-1910) in 1842.
