= Clarence Clark =

Clarence Clark may refer to:

- Clarence Clark (tennis) (1859–1937), American tennis player
- Clarence Clark (golfer) (1907–1974), American golfer
- Clarence D. Clark (1851–1930), American teacher, lawyer, and politician from Wyoming
- Clarence Howard Clark Sr. (1833–1906), banker, land owner, and developer in Philadelphia, Pennsylvania
- Clarence Howard Clark Jr. (1862–1916), financier in Philadelphia, Pennsylvania
