= Kimball, Virginia =

Unincorporated community in Virginia, US

Coordinates: 38°41′13″N 78°24′09″W

Kimball is an unincorporated community in Page County, in the U.S. state of Virginia. It was named for Frederick J. Kimball, an early president of the Norfolk and Western Railway.
