= Edward White Clark =

American banker (1828–1904)

- Born: January 20, 1828
- Died: April 9, 1904 (aged 76)
- Occupation: E. W. Clark & Company
- Spouse: Mary Todhunter Sill
- Children: Edward Walter Clark II; Clarence Munroe Clark; Joseph Sill Clark Sr. Herbert L. Clark; Marion Clark; Percy Hamilton Clark
- Parent(s): Enoch White Clark; Sarah Crawford Dodge
- Relatives: Clarence Howard Clark Sr. (brother); J. Hinckley Clark (brother); Frank Hamilton Clark (brother)

Edward White Clark (January 20, 1828 – April 9, 1904) was the head of E. W. Clark & Company, a prominent financial firm in Philadelphia, Pennsylvania.

== Biography ==
He was born on January 20, 1828, to Enoch White Clark, a member of the Clark banking family and Sarah Crawford Dodge. He married Mary T. Sill on July 18, 1855, and had six children: Edward Walter II (1858–1946), Clarence Munroe (1859–1937), Joseph Sill Sr. (1861–1956), Herbert L. (1865–1940), Marion (1867–1938), and Percy Hamilton (1873–1965).

Clark developed an interest in Assyriology and Egyptology, and along with his brother Clarence, endowed the Chair in Babylonian Research at the University of Pennsylvania. This marked the university's first step toward creating the University of Pennsylvania Museum of Archaeology and Anthropology. He died on April 9, 1904.
