= First National Bank (Philadelphia) =

Coordinates: 39.949095°N 75.146420°W

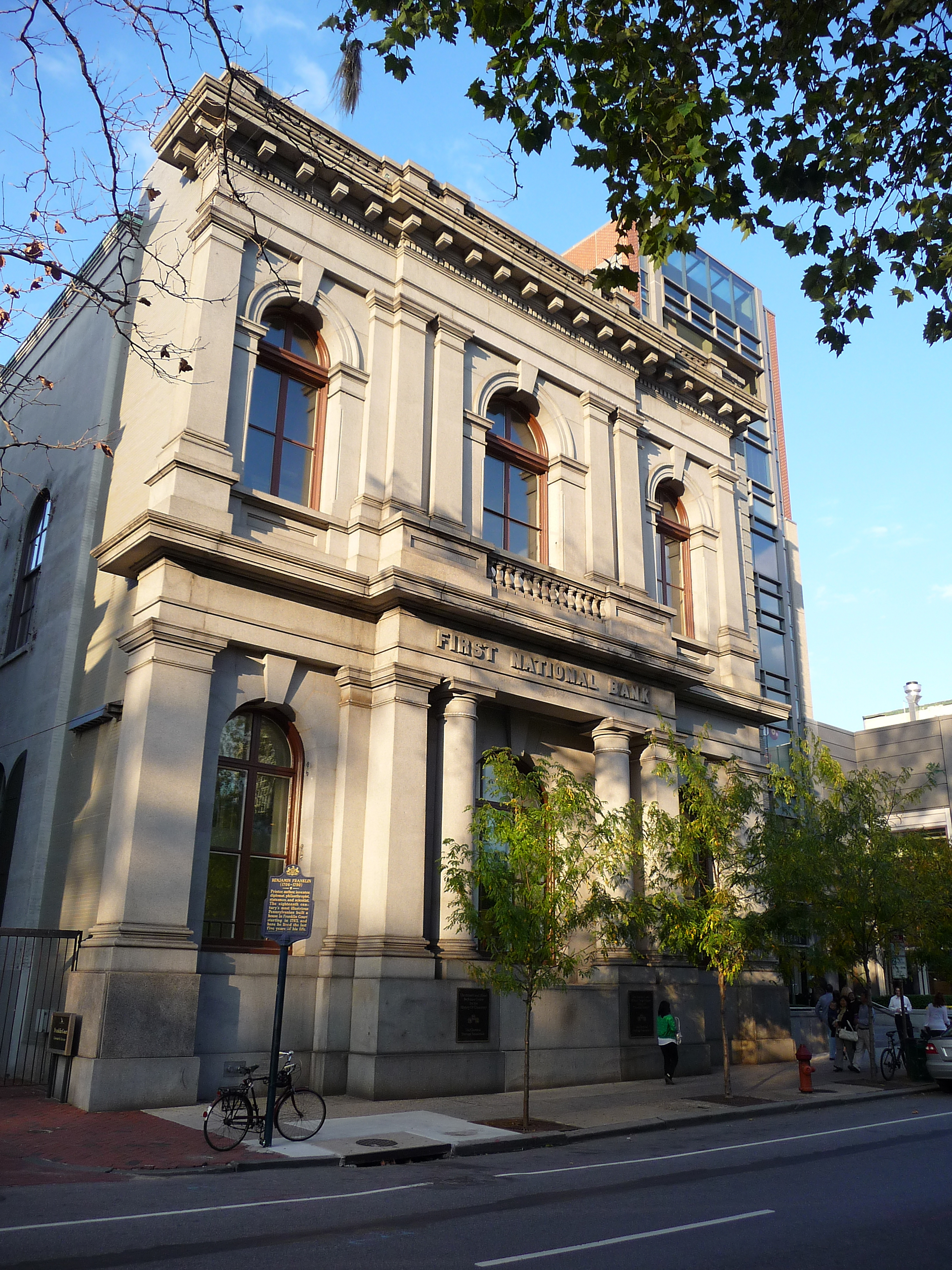
The First National Bank Building at 315 Chestnut Street, now part of the Science History Institute

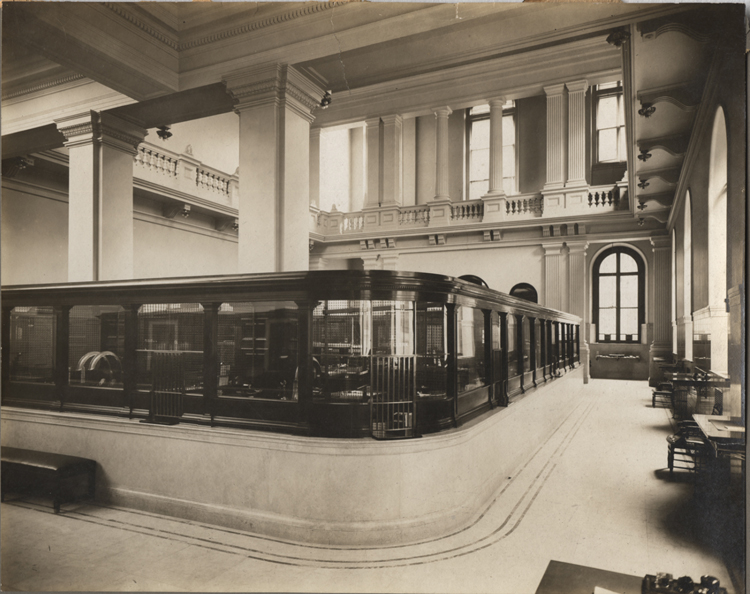
Original interior of First National Bank, ca. 1911, by William H. Rau

First National Bank was a bank in Philadelphia. Chartered in 1863, it was the first national bank created under the banking reforms of the Civil War that began to define the modern U.S. banking system, and the first commercial bank to issue a federal banknote. It operated independently until 1955, when it was merged into the Bank of North America and Trust Company, which now is part of Wells Fargo.

== History ==
=== 19th century ===
During the Civil War, the cash-strapped Lincoln administration, acting on the suggestion of Philadelphia financier Jay Cooke, sought to create a true national currency by fostering a class of strong banks entitled to print banknotes backed by the U.S. federal government. Congress took up the effort with the National Banking Act of 1863 (previously called the National Currency Act), passed on February 25, 1863.

The first charter under the new Act went to a group of Philadelphia financiers that included Cooke. They received the charter on June 20, opened the doors of First National Bank on July 11, and that same day became the first commercial bank to issue a federal banknote.

The bank's first president was Owen Wilson Davis, who on June 16, 1863, provided money to buy horses for the First Troop Philadelphia City Cavalry so it could deploy to meet the Confederate Army at Gettysburg.

The bank's president from 1863 to 1873 was Clarence Howard Clark, Sr.

=== 20th century ===
In 1955, First National Bank merged with the Bank of North America and Trust Company, a successor to the Bank of North America, to become The First Pennsylvania Banking and Trust Company. This firm became Corestates which was acquired by First Union, which became Wachovia Bank, which was acquired by Wells Fargo in 2009.

== Building ==
The bank commissioned a new building at 315 Chestnut Street, which became "an anchor of what was America's original Wall Street." Designed by Philadelphia architect John McArthur Jr., for a fee of $3,500, the building's cornerstone was laid on May 23, 1866, and it was completed by contractor John Rice for $121,300 ($2,605,000 today). The vault and locks were provided by Farrell and Herring for $16,310.

The Historic American Buildings Survey describes the building as a "Masonry and brick building; rectangular plan 60' × 82' [18 m × 25 m]; two stories high; symmetrical, three-bay facade; architectural membering of the facade with pedestals, engaged columns and piers, belt course, entablatures, cornice and roof balustrade; round-headed openings." It was considered "outstanding as an example of the Palazzo facade adapted to a bank building".

In 1953, the interior was stripped, and the building later became vacant.

In 1995, the building was acquired by the Chemical Heritage Foundation, which renovated it as a museum of the history of chemistry. As of February 1, 2018, the Chemical Heritage Foundation was renamed the Science History Institute.

== See also ==
- List of bank mergers in the United States
