= Lucius E. Johnson =

American railroad executive

Lucius Johnson
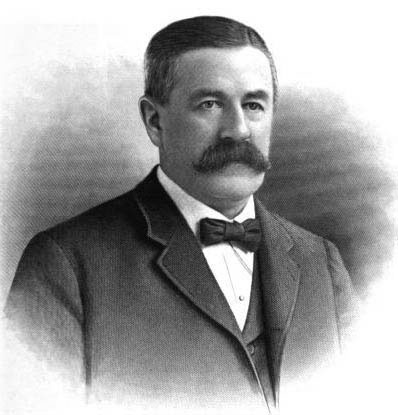
- Johnson c. 1906
- Born: April 13, 1846; Aurora, Illinois, United States
- Died: February 9, 1921 (aged 74); DeLand, Florida, United States
- Resting place: Aurora, Illinois, United States
- Spouse: Ella Parker (m. 1869)
- Children: 5

Lucius E. Johnson (April 13, 1846 – February 9, 1921) was a president of the Norfolk and Western Railway from September 30, 1903, until the mid teens, when he was named chairman of the board, a position he held until his retirement on January 1, 1921. For five months in 1918 (during World War I), he served as chairman of its board. He lived in Roanoke, Virginia, United States.

Johnson started his railroad career after leaving school in Aurora, working as a brakeman, fireman, then locomotive engineer. He became a master mechanic at Aurora. In 1886, he was made superintendent of the St. Louis division of the Chicago, Burlington and Quincy R. R. In December, 1888, he returned to Aurora as superintendent of the Chicago division of the same road. In 1890, he was asked to take the superintendency of the Montana Central Railroad, with headquarters at Helena, Montana. In less than three years, he was made superintendent of the Michigan division of the Lake Shore and Michigan Southern Railroad, and in July, 1897, became general superintendent of the Norfolk and Western Railway. In two years, he was made vice-president and general manager of the whole Norfolk and Western system. On September 30, 1903, Lucius E. Johnson was elected to the presidency of the Norfolk and Western Railway.

Johnson succeeded the legendary Frederick Kimball, who had opened the Pocahontas coalfields to land the N&W railroad owned.

In 1906, as N&W president, Johnson had the dubious distinction of being brought to the Standard Oil building at 26 Broadway in New York City by Andrew Carnegie to meet with one of Carnegie's old friends, millionaire financier Henry Rogers. N&W corporate records only state that the meeting lasted only a few minutes. However, Johnson was apparently the first of the leaders of the big railroads who finally learned the mysterious source of William Page's deep pockets, which had been building a new railroad across southern West Virginia and Virginia to compete for the coal traffic destined for Hampton Roads.

The N&W would come to envy and covet the Virginian Railway and its more modern and gentler gradient pathway for eastbound coal for over 50 years before finally acquiring it through merger in 1959.

Johnson served on the board of visitors of Virginia Polytechnic Institute and State University from 1908 to 1912 and was rector from 1910 to 1912.

On April 10, 1869, Mr. Johnson married Miss Ella Parker. They had five children, of whom two sons, George P. Johnson of Pittsburgh, Pa., and Edward M. Johnson of Roanoke, were living at the time of his death (as was his wife).

== See also ==
- List of railroad executives

Preceded by Frederick Kimball	President of Norfolk and Western Railway; 1904–1921	Succeeded by Nicholas Maher
