= Edward Walter Clark Jr. =

Edward Walter Clark
- Born: May 17, 1857; Philadelphia, Pennsylvania, U.S.
- Died: April 4, 1946 (aged 88); Philadelphia, Pennsylvania, U.S.
- Employer: E. W. Clark & Co.
- Spouse: Lydia Jane Clark
- Children: Edward Walter Clark III
- Parent(s): Edward White Clark; Mary Todhunter Sill
- Relatives: Enoch White Clark (grandfather); Edward Walter Clark II (brother); Clarence Munroe Clark (brother); Joseph Sill Clark Sr. (brother); Percy Hamilton Clark (brother)

Edward Walter Clark (May 17, 1857 – April 4, 1946) was a Philadelphia businessman and banker who was also noted as a first-class cricketer, yachtsman, and a breeder of cocker spaniels.

A third-generation member of the Clark banking family, Clark was a senior partner in the E. W. Clark & Co. investment house, a vice president of the First National Bank of Philadelphia, and a manager of Lehigh Coal & Navigation Company. In his leisure time, he was a prominent cricket player in Philadelphia-area clubs, served as commodore of the Philadelphia Corinthian Yacht Club, and was a part-owner of the Irolita Kennels.

== Biography ==
He was born in Philadelphia, Pennsylvania, on May 17, 1857. He was the eldest of six siblings, including a brother, Clarence Munroe Clark, born to Mary Todhunter Sill (1835-1908) and Edward White Clark (1828-1904). His grandfather was Enoch White Clark (1802-1856). Edward was called "Jr." to distinguish him from his father.

Clark, who attended Germantown Academy and the University of Pennsylvania. He married Lydia Jane Newhall (1858-1936) on October 31, 1882, in Philadelphia. They had two sons, George Newhall Clark (1887-1906), who died while at Harvard of influenza; and Sydney Procter Clark; and two daughters, Frances Clark Stoddard, and Christine Clark Willetts.

In 1904, he became a senior partner at E. W. Clark & Co.

He became a trustee of the Pomfret School, and gave the school a dormitory, Dunworth, in 1905. In 1907, he donated the Clark Memorial Chapel to honor his deceased son.

In 1925, he bought the yacht Resolute. In 1930, with Winthrop Aldrich and Vincent Astor, he financed the sloop Enterprise to compete in the America's Cup.

== Clubs ==
He was a member of the Rittenhouse Club, the Racquet Club of Philadelphia, the Germantown Cricket Club, the Union League, the New York Yacht Club.

== Cricket ==
Clark was a prominent cricketer, playing as a right-handed middle-order batsman and a right-arm medium bowler, bowling in the round-arm style. His career in front-rank American cricket lasted from 1877 to 1906, during which he played for many different sides.

Between 1880 and 1897, he appeared in 27 matches that are considered as "first-class cricket", some of them all-American games and others against touring teams from England. His highest first-class score was an innings of 147 made in a rather strange match in 1894 in which his team batted for the whole of the two days allotted to the game, which was therefore left drawn.

His brothers Herbert, Joseph, and Percy also played first-class cricket, though Joseph was better known as a tennis champion.

== Death ==
He died on April 4, 1946, at Thomas Jefferson University Hospital in Philadelphia.
