= Economic history of the American Civil War =

The economic history of the American Civil War concerns the financing of the Union and Confederate war efforts from 1861 to 1865, and the economic impact of the war.

The Union economy grew and prospered during the war while fielding a very large Union Army and Union Navy. The Republican Party in Washington, D.C. had a Whiggish vision of an industrialized country, with great cities, efficient factories, productive farms, all national banks, all knit together by a modern railroad system, to be mobilized by the United States Military Railroad. The Southern United States had resisted policies such as tariffs to promote industry and the Homestead Acts to promote farming, because slavery in the United States would not benefit. With the South gone and the Northern Democratic Party weak, the Republicans enacted their legislation. At the same time, they passed new taxes to pay for part of the war and issued large amounts of bonds to pay for most of the rest. Economic historians attribute the remainder of the cost of the war to inflation. According to Matthew Gallman, in terms of total war spending, the federal government of the United States spent $18 billion and the U.S. states spent $0.5 billion. This does not count long-term costs after the war ended, such as veterans' benefits. The Confederate federal and state governments spent the equivalent of $1.0 billion in US dollars. The US obtained 21% of the war funding from taxation, 66% from borrowing, and 13% from inflation. By contrast, the Confederacy obtained only 5% from taxation, 35% from borrowing, and 60% from inflation.

In Washington, D.C., the United States Congress wrote an elaborate program of economic modernization that had the dual purpose of winning the war and permanently transforming the economy.

The wartime devastation of the South was great and poverty ensued; the incomes of White Americans dropped, but income of the freedmen rose. During Reconstruction, railroad construction was heavily subsidized (with much corruption), but the region maintained its dependence on cotton production. Freedmen became wage laborers, tenant farmers, or sharecroppers. They were joined by many Poor Whites, as the population grew faster than the economy. As late as 1940, the only significant manufacturing industries were textile mills (mostly in the upland Carolinas) and some steelmaking in Alabama.

The industrial advantages of the North over the South helped secure a Northern victory in the American Civil War (1861–1865). The Northern victory sealed the destiny of the nation and its economic system. The slave-labor system was abolished; sharecropping emerged and replaced slavery to supply the labor needed for cotton production, but cotton prices plunged during the Panic of 1873, leading the plantation complexes in the Southern United States to decline in profitability. Northern industry, which had expanded rapidly before and during the war, surged ahead. Industrialists came to dominate many aspects of the nation's life, including social and political affairs.

== Union policy ==
After the war began in April 1861, President Abraham Lincoln and Secretary of the Treasury Salmon P. Chase faced the massive challenge of funding it. In Congress Senator William P. Fessenden and Congressman Thaddeus Stevens took the lead. Congress quickly approved Lincoln's request to assemble a 500,000-man army, but initially resisted raising taxes to pay for the war. However, after the Union defeat at the First Battle of Bull Run in July, Congress passed the Revenue Act of 1861, which imposed the first federal income tax in U.S. history. The act created a flat tax of three percent on incomes above $800 ($28,700 in current dollar terms). This taxation of income reflected the increasing amount of wealth held in stocks and bonds rather than property, which the federal government had taxed in the past. As the average urban worker made $600 per year, the income tax burden fell primarily on the rich.

=== High protective tariff ===
Congress passed the second and third Morrill Tariffs, the first having become law in the final months of Buchanan's tenure. These tariff acts raised import duties considerably compared, and they were designed to both raise revenue and protect domestic manufacturing against foreign competition. During the war, the tariff also helped manufacturers off-set the burden of new taxes. Compared to pre-war levels, the tariff would remain relatively high for the remainder of the 19th century. Throughout the war, members of Congress would debate whether to raise further revenue primarily through increased tariff rates, which most strongly affected rural areas in the West, or increased income taxes, which most strongly affected wealthier individuals in the Northeast.

=== Greenbacks ===
The revenue measures of 1861 proved inadequate for the funding of the war, forcing Congress to pass further bills designed to generate revenue. In February 1862, Congress passed the Legal Tender Act, which authorized the minting of $150 million (~$3.66 billion in 2024) of "greenbacks." The debate was fierce as "paper money" seemed a route to excessive inflation and had no prewar support. But the Army needed to pay its suppliers and soldiers without delay. Greenbacks were the first banknotes issued by the federal government since the end of the American Revolution, when the "Continentals" caused runaway inflation and became almost worthless. The new Greenbacks were not backed by specie (gold or silver), but rather by the requirement that merchants honor their face value for purchases and debts. By the end of the war, $450 million worth of greenbacks were in circulation. They were highly effective and (after borrowing) were the major solution the Treasury needed to finance the war

=== Taxes ===
As military expenses soared, the Union armies faltered in their plan to capture Richmond. Pessimism grew in financial circles. The Congress passed the Revenue Act of 1862, which established a new excise tax that affected nearly every commodity. The new tax was similar to the sales tax imposed by state governments in the 20th century. According to one newspaper account, it set a federal tax on: Liquor, beer, tobacco, cigars, lard, linseed oil, paper, soap, salt, shoe leather, flour, railroad passengers (per mile), steamboat passengers, ferry boats, trolleys, advertisements, and carriages. The new law also imposed the first income tax, starting at 3% on incomes over $600 a year and 5% on incomes over $10,000. Dozens of lobbyists fought back, warning that even a small 5% tax would bankrupt small business; Congress pushed ahead because the war crisis was urgent. The new law also imposed the first national inheritance tax. To collect these taxes, Congress created the Office of the Commissioner of Internal Revenue within the Treasury Department. Starting with three clerks it quickly expanded to 4,000 clerks and field agents in 185 districts. Lincoln signed the Revenue Act on July 1, 1862, and two weeks later signed the new tariff law, that raised rates to 37%. Britain was the largest trading partner, and its protests were ignored by Americans annoyed that it had created and funded a system of blockade runners to supply the South with food and munitions.

Despite these new measures, funding the war continued to be a difficult struggle for Chase and the Lincoln administration. The government continued to issue greenbacks and borrow large amounts of money, and the United States' national debt grew from $65 million in 1860 to $2 billion in 1866. Congress passed the Revenue Act of 1864, which represented a compromise between those who favored a more progressive tax structure and those who favored a flat tax. The act established a five percent tax on incomes greater than $600, a ten percent tax on incomes above $10,000, and raised taxes on businesses. In early 1865, Congress passed another tax increase, levying a tax of ten percent on incomes above $5,000. By 1865, the income tax constituted about one-fifth of the revenue of the federal government. The federal inheritance tax would remain in effect until its repeal in 1870, while the federal income tax was repealed in 1872.

Hoping to stabilize the currency, Chase convinced Congress to pass the National Banking Act in February 1863, as well as a second banking act in 1864. Those acts established the Office of the Comptroller of the Currency to oversee "national banks," which would be subject to federal, rather than state, regulation. In return for investing a third of their capital in federal bonds, these national banks were authorized to issue federal banknotes. After Congress imposed a tax on private banknotes in March 1865, federal banknotes would become the dominant form of paper currency in the United States.

=== Borrowing ===
Both sides tried to borrow; the Union did a much better job, primarily because the new national banking system had monetized the North's wealth. Philadelphia banker Jay Cooke democratized financing. He organized highly publicized campaigns that enabled ordinary middle class citizens to purchase $50 savings bonds in monthly installments. Sales reached $1.2 billion and paid for 40% of the federal war budget. The purchasers of bonds gave up money that would have been spent on civilian goods, in return for the promise that they would be repaid with interest after the war. They were; the bonds were eventually paid off by taxpayers who were children in 1860, and who by 1890 were much wealthier than their parents. Taxes also diverted spending from the civilian into the military sector, but the burden fell entirely upon the wartime taxpayer. Probably half the savings of the North went into the war effort, but there was much left over to invest in new factories, railroads, and enterprises. The private sector flourished in the North, and shrivelled away in the South. In Philadelphia, one new factory opened every week; in the South, one closed every week.

In terms of selling bonds in Europe, the Union had little luck. The main British and French banks, including the Rothschilds, were highly reluctant. Furthermore the Trent Affair of late 1861 angered the London bankers who saw the risk of war between Britain and the United States. However, the Barings Bank did fund U.S. arms purchases.

== Confederate policy ==
The Confederate States of America (1861-1865) started with an agrarian-based economy that relied on slave-worked plantations for the production of cotton for export to Europe and to the northern states. If classed as an independent country, the area of the Confederate States would have ranked as the fourth-richest country of the world in 1860. The Confederacy had banked on European intervention but it proved a fallacy that "Cotton is King". There was an opportunity to ship as much cotton as possible to Europe in early 1861 before the Union blockade took effect. However Confederate policy was to ship none at all, so that European textile mills would demand their government intervene to help the Confederacy. The Confederates were poorly informed and did not know that European mills already had plenty of cotton in storage. Britain needed Northern grain more urgently than Southern cotton, because it was a main element of its food supply.

Vigorous fund raising yielded £3 million (about $14.5 million in gold dollars) from the 1862 bond sale to the Erlanger bank in Paris. It was not repeated. The money was mostly wasted on ships that were never delivered (because of the Union blockade) and in futile efforts to prop up the price of Confederate bonds to fool Europeans that the new nation was doing well. The British had money to invest. They bought some Confederate bonds but spent far more on the blockade runners as in Confederate bonds.

When the Union began its blockade of Confederate ports in the summer of 1861, exports of cotton fell 95 percent and the South had to restructure itself to emphasize the production of food and munitions for internal use. After losing control of its main rivers and ports, the Confederacy had to depend for transport on a weak railroad system that, with few repairs being made, no new equipment, and destructive raids, crumbled away. The financial infrastructure collapsed during the war as inflation destroyed banks and forced a move toward a barter economy for civilians. The Confederate government seized needed supplies and livestock (paying with Government bonds that were promised to be paid off after the war, but never were). By 1865, the Confederate economy was in ruins and the 11 states remained poor for another century.

=== Monetary finance and inflation ===
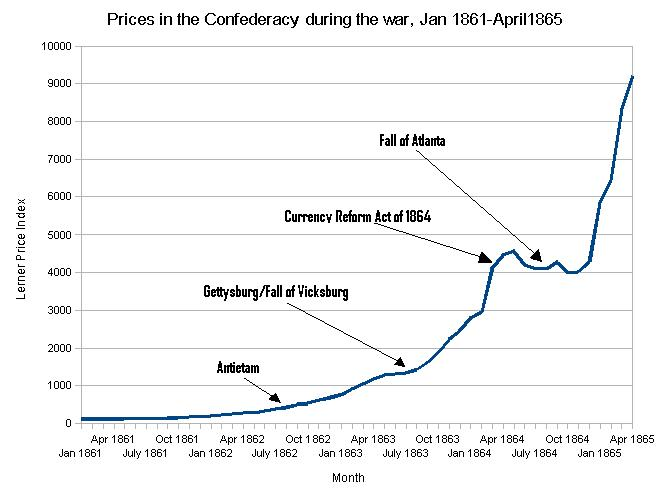
Monthly price index in the Confederacy during the war rose from 100 in January 1861 to over 9200 in April 1865. In addition to being fueled by dramatic increases in the amount of money in circulation, prices also increased in response to negative news from the battlefield.

The financing of war expenditures by the means of currency issues (printing money) was by far the major avenue resorted to by the Confederate government. Between 1862 and 1865, more than 60% of total revenue was created in this way. While the North doubled its money supply during the war, the volume of money in the South increased 20 times over from 1861 to 1865, and prices soared. An item that cost one Confederate dollar in 1861 cost 92 of these dollars in 1865.

=== Devastation ===
According to William Hesseltine:

Throughout the South, fences were down, weeds had overrun the fields, windows were broken, live stock had disappeared. The assessed valuation of property declined from 30 to 60 percent in the decade after 1860. In Mobile, business was stagnant; Chattanooga and Nashville were ruined; and Atlanta's industrial sections were in ashes.

Estimate of Confederate losses were 94,000 killed in battle and another 164,000 who died of disease, with about 194,000 wounded. More accurate recent estimates say another 75,000-100,000 Confederate soldiers died.

While damage to Union locales was limited to the border region, the Confederacy was massively affected. By the end of the war, deterioration of the Southern infrastructure was widespread. The number of civilian deaths is unknown. Every Confederate state was affected, but most of the war was fought in Virginia and Tennessee, while Texas and Florida saw the least military action. Much of the damage was caused by direct military action, but most was caused by lack of repairs and upkeep, and by deliberately using up resources. Historians have recently estimated how much of the devastation was caused by military action. Paul Paskoff calculates that Union military operations were conducted in 56% of 645 counties in nine Confederate states (excluding Texas and Florida). These counties contained 63% of the 1860 white population and 64% of the slaves. By the time the fighting took place, undoubtedly some people had fled to safer areas, so the exact population exposed to war is unknown.

== See also ==
- History of the Southern United States
- Confederate railroads in the American Civil War
