= Clarence Howard Clark Sr. =

19th-century American banker

- Born: April 19, 1833; Providence, Rhode Island
- Died: March 6, 1906 (aged 72); Chestnutwold
- Spouse(s): Amie Hampton Wescott; Marie Motley Davis
- Parent(s): Enoch White Clark; Sarah Crawford Dodge
- Relatives: Edward Walter Clark I (brother); J. Hinckley Clark (brother); Frank Hamilton Clark (brother)

Clarence Howard Clark Sr. (April 19, 1833 – March 6, 1906) was a banker, land owner, and developer in Philadelphia, Pennsylvania. Ten years after his death, The New York Times called him one of the city's "most prominent men of his day."

== Biography ==
Clark was born in Providence, Rhode Island, on April 19, 1833, to Sarah Crawford Dodge and Enoch White Clark. The family moved to Boston that same year, where Enoch, a financier, incurred substantial debts. They then moved to Philadelphia in January 1837, where Enoch and his brother-in-law, Edward Dodge, founded the banking firm E. W. Clark & Co. later that year.

That firm did well, earning enough to pay off the debts in seven years, then to propel the Clarks to a place among the city's wealthiest families. The firm opened branches in New York, St. Louis, and New Orleans, and made considerable money performing domestic exchanges in the wake of the 1836 revocation of the charter of the Second Bank of the United States and the Panic of 1837. The elder Clark died in 1856 of complications of nicotine poisoning. The firm went on to control many public utility and railroad properties.

In 1854, Clarence Clark joined the family firm. The firm was dissolved on December 31, 1857, and reformed the following day with these partners: Clark, his older brother Edward White Clark, Frederick J. Kimball, and H. H. Wainwright.

Clark was instrumental in developing West Philadelphia, which was transformed over the 19th century from an area of farmland and light industry to a streetcar suburb. Clark bought land from various sellers, including Nathaniel B. Browne, a lawyer and landowner who had developed West Philly's first residential blocks in the 1850s. Among his partners in development were William S. Kimball and a man named McKlosky. At one point, he owned "the ground from 42nd to 43rd Street, Walnut to Pine".

He moved to West Philly in the early 1860s, and built a 34-room mansion named Chestnutwold at 4200 Locust Street. The three-story brownstone mansion, built at a cost of $300,000, included "hardwood floors; hand-carved mahogany paneling, six feet high around the rooms; stained glass windows, said by art dealers to be matchless"; wallpaper "hand painted by a Japanese"; an $1,800 chandelier, a $2,000 mantelpiece, mosaic tiling, radiant heat from hot water piped under the floors, a hydraulic elevator, and "secret vaults for the treasures of silver plate." It also had a private art gallery and a $27,000 library that held a large collection of books, meticulously catalogued in two volumes. The parklike grounds, which occupied a full city block on the southwest corner of 42nd Street, were open to the public, and included a fine collection of plants, including "a rare Chinese jinko tree, the first to be brought to America." (Chestnutwold would be torn down in 1916 by the Philadelphia Wrecking and Contracting Company. It would be replaced 10 years later by the Episcopal Divinity School, which was built in 1926.)

His was not the only millionaire's house set among what one historian called a "crazy quilt of farms and estates, crisscrossed by free-running creeks"; the Drexels owned several houses at 39th and Locust and the Potts family had a brick mansion at 3905 Spruce.

As a developer, Clark took the rowhouse form that was becoming the standard dwelling and altered it by moving the buildings some 20 feet back from the street on their lots. His first example is the 4000 block of Locust Street.

In 1862, Clark helped found the Union League of Philadelphia, a patriotic society that survives today as a city club.

By the end of the American Civil War, Clark was president of the chartered First National Bank, the first bank to issue federal banknotes. Clark signed the first one.

In 1866, he and some partners chartered the Fidelity Insurance, Trust & Safe Deposit Co., which later became Fidelity Trust Company and Fidelity-Philadelphia Trust Co., then was absorbed into First Fidelity, First Union, Wachovia, and Wells Fargo.

In 1867, he, along with his brothers Edward and Frank, became a member of the Academy of Natural Sciences of Philadelphia.

In 1876, Clark helped found the Centennial National Bank, chartered on January 19 to be the “financial agent of the board at the Centennial Exhibition, receiving and accounting for daily receipts, changing foreign moneys into current funds, etc.", according to a January 22 piece in The Philadelphia Inquirer. The bank commissioned architect Frank Furness to design its headquarters building, which opened in April on the southeast corner of Market Street and 32nd Street, across from the Pennsylvania Railroad station. A branch office operated during the Centennial on the fairgrounds. Among other activities, the bank financed various West Philly development efforts.

In 1881, Clark helped E.W. Clark and Co. acquire the 11-year-old Atlantic, Mississippi & Ohio Railroad, renaming it the Norfolk & Western Railway and taking a seat on the board of directors. Other deals landed him seats on the boards of the Buffalo, New York, and Philadelphia Railroad and the Railroad Equipment Company.

In 1889, Clark was elected to the American Philosophical Society.

He was an active Unitarian. He was a member of several clubs, including the Pennsylvania Horticultural Society, of which he served as 14th president; the Genealogical Society of Pennsylvania, and the Bibliophile Society of Boston. In 1894, when the Free Library of Philadelphia created a board of trustees, Clark was on the first board. That same year, the city government established a board to promote and create museums, and Clark was on it, too. In 1899, he was a Life Member (City Division) of the Fairmount Park Art Association, and served on its Standing Committee on Works of Art and its Standing Committee on Smith Memorial.

He donated several acres of land that became West Philadelphia's Clark Park, and land for the Walnut Street West branch of the Philadelphia Free Library.

Clark died at Chestnutwold on March 6, 1906.

== Family ==
Clark married Amie Hampton Wescott and they had at least one son, Clarence Howard Clark Jr.; Amie died in 1870 during childbirth.

In 1873, he married Marie Motley Davis, a resident of Boston and niece of author John Lothrop Motley. They had a son, Charles Motley Clark, who graduated from Harvard with a degree in manufacturing in 1901 and worked as an ambulance driver during World War I.
