= Edward Walter Clark III =

American banker

- Born: 1885
- Died: November 16, 1939 (aged 53–54)
- Employer: E. W. Clark & Co.
- Parent(s): Edward Walter Clark Jr. Lydia Jane Clark

Edward Walter Clark III (1885 – November 16, 1939) was an investment banker with E. W. Clark & Co.

== Biography ==
He was born in 1885 to Edward Walter Clark Jr. and Mary Newbold (Taylor) Clark. He graduated from Harvard University in 1907; the following year, he won golf's Presidents Cup (Harvard). During World War I, he served overseas with the Army Signal Corps.

He worked at E.W. Clark for 19 years, making partner in 1920. He also served for several years as a director of the Farmers National Bank of Bucks County, Pennsylvania, founded by a maternal great-grandfather.

Clark died on November 16, 1939, in Chestnut Hill Hospital after a brief illness.
