= Percy Clark =

American cricketer

Percy Hamilton Clark
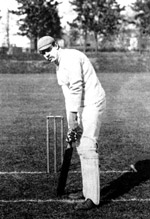

Personal information
- Born: August 7, 1873; Germantown, Pennsylvania, U.S.
- Died: August 12, 1965 (aged 92)
- Batting: Right-handed
- Bowling: Right-arm fast-medium

Career statistics
Competition	First-class
Matches	53
Runs scored	897
Batting average	12.81
100s/50s	0/2
Top score	67
Balls bowled	8,353
Wickets	199
Bowling average	21.97
5 wickets in innings	11
10 wickets in match	4
Best bowling	8/91
Catches/stumpings	31/–
- Source: CricketArchive, April 15, 2021

Percy Hamilton Clark (August 7, 1873 – August 12, 1965) was an American cricketer. He was a right-handed batsman and a right-arm fast-medium bowler. He began playing cricket in 1885 and soon found himself at the top of the game in the USA during the brief "Golden Age" of North American cricket.

== Early life ==
Clark was born on August 7, 1873, in Germantown, Pennsylvania, to Edward White Clark, a member of the Clark banking family, and Mary Todhunter (née Sill) Clark.

Clark received a bachelor's degree from Harvard College in 1892 and, later, a law degree from the University of Pennsylvania.

== Career ==
Clark played for the USA national team, and took five or more wickets on four occasions in the regular match against Canada, his best being 6/41 in the 1900 game in Manheim. Whilst not known for his batting, he did make two first-class half-centuries. His best was a score of 67, also coming in the 1903 match against Worcestershire where he recorded his best bowling. He often opened the bowling with Bart King when playing for the Philadelphian cricket team and the USA national team. He played 53 first-class matches in all, taking 199 wickets in his career at an average of 21.97, taking 10 wickets in a match four times, and having an innings best of 8/91 against Worcestershire in 1903. The Australian Test spin bowler Arthur Mailey said that by the way Clark imparted spin to the ball he "was able to vary the length of swerve or dictate at which point in its flight the ball would begin to change its course".

=== Legal career ===
Clark and his brother, Joseph Sill Clark, Sr., opened a law practice together at 321 Chestnut Street in Philadelphia. His practice centered on the "street railway, electric light, and power businesses" operated by E. W. Clark & Co., his family's financial firm.

== Personal life ==
On October 15, 1904, Clark married Elizabeth Williams Roberts (1879–1959), a daughter of George Brooke Roberts, the president of the Pennsylvania Railroad. Percy and Elizabeth were the parents of eight children, including:

- Miriam Roberts Clark (1905–1992), who married lawyer Phillip Wallis in 1927.
- Mary Todhunter "Tod" Clark (1907–1999), who married the future New York governor and Vice President Nelson Rockefeller, in 1930.
- Percy Hamilton Clark Jr. (b. 1908)
- George Roberts Clark (1910–1998)
- Dr. Thomas Williams Clark (b. 1912)
- William Lincoln Clark (1914–1968)
- John Roberts Clark (b. 1916)
- David Williams Clark (b. 1920)

His wife died at their home in Ithan, Pennsylvania in June 1959. Clark died on August 12, 1965, at the age of 92.

=== Willoughby ===
In 1908, his father-in-law gave the couple some of his land along Belmont Avenue in Bala Cynwyd, Pennsylvania. They commissioned a cousin, Clarence C. Zantzinger, to design a mansion, which they named "Willoughby." Household staff included a houseman, cook, scullery maid, waitress, governess, a nurse, chambermaid, two gardeners, a farmer, and a driver. They added a chauffeur's cottage and a barn, which supported a small working farm with seven cows, one horse, and 400 chickens.

In 1951, the Willoughby estate was sold to The Mary J. Drexel Home, a nursing home named for Mary Johanna Drexel (a daughter of Francis Martin Drexel)

=== Descendants ===
Through his daughter "Tod", he was a grandfather to five: Rodman Rockefeller, Anne Rockefeller, Steven Clark Rockefeller, and twins Michael Clark Rockefeller and Mary Rockefeller. Tod and Nelson divorced in 1962, which was considered to have hurt Nelson's 1964 bid to become the GOP's candidate for U.S. president.
