= Clarence Howard Clark Jr. =

American financier

- Born: 1862
- Died: January 9, 1916 (aged 53–54)
- Parent(s): Clarence Howard Clark Sr. Amie Hampton Wescott

Clarence Howard Clark Jr. (1862 – January 9, 1916) was a financier in Philadelphia, Pennsylvania.

== Biography ==
He was born in 1862 to Clarence Howard Clark Sr. He followed his father into his grandfather's business, hiring on as a clerk with E. W. Clark & Co. in 1879 and becoming a partner in 1885. He was admitted to the Philadelphia Stock Exchange in 1888 and served for 10 years as president of the Centennial National Bank.

The son, who often went by the name C. Howard Clark, built his own mansion near his father's house in West Philadelphia, at 4220 Spruce Street, on the southwest corner of 42nd Street. He later moved to "Chestnutwold Farm" at Valley Forge and Dorset roads in Devon, Pennsylvania, where he built a house in 1911 on a century-old 57-acre estate that he bought from Christopher Fallon, which he bought from the Perkins family. The Clarks sold the estate in 1923 for $250,000 ($4,724,000 today) to Dorothy E. Cadwalader.

An avid yachtman, Clark was a member of the Corinthian Yacht Club of Philadelphia; the New York Yacht Club; and the Eastern Yacht Club and the Corinthian, both of Marblehead, Massachusetts.

Clark died of "a stroke of apoplexy" on January 10, 1916, at the Pineland Country Club in Mullins, South Carolina.

He was survived by his wife, Eleanor D. Head Clark Jr., who died August 29, 1930, at her summer home in Northeast Harbor, Maine, and a son, Clarence H. Clark III (-1943). Clark III, whose own financial partnership, Kendrick & Co., failed in 1922, was a member of the First Troop Philadelphia City Cavalry, with which he served during World War I as a captain in the 310th Field Artillery. Clark III married Eleanor Townsend Clark (1899-1981), with whom he had two daughters, including Eleanor Yerkes, and a son, Clarence H. Clark IV, who served in the Army Air Corps during World War II. Clark IV, husband of Jean E. Clark, had a son, Clarence H. Clark V, and a daughter, Amy Clark (d. 2012). Clark V and his wife Kathleen had a son, Chip, and a daughter, Betsy.
