= Lake Superior and Mississippi Railroad =

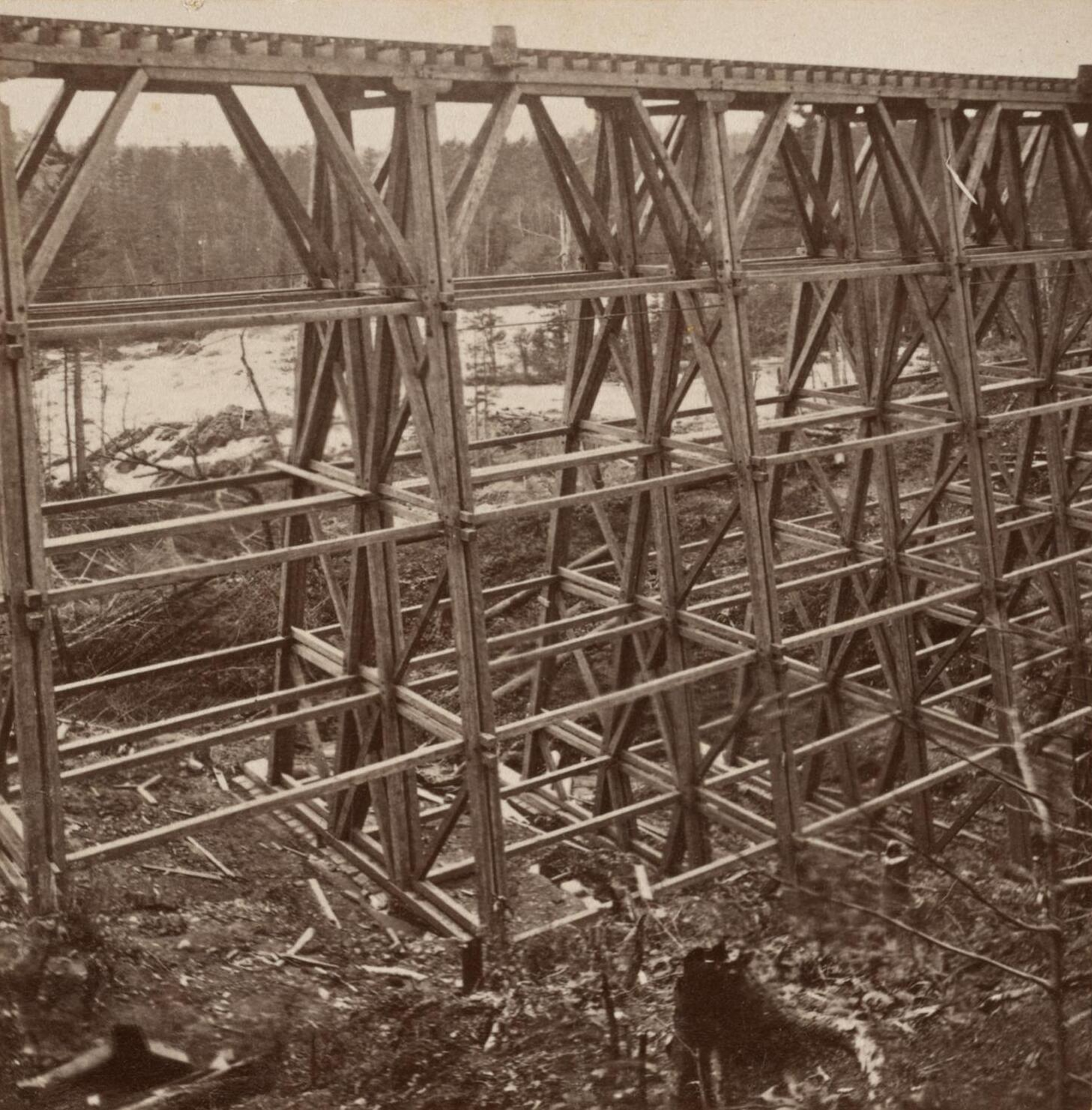
On the Lake Superior & Mississippi Railroad

The Lake Superior and Mississippi Railroad is the name of two railroads in Minnesota: a freight and passenger line that operated from 1870 to 1877 and a heritage railroad that has operated since 1981.

== Historic railroad ==
The Lake Superior and Mississippi Railroad (LS&M) was the first rail link between the Twin Cities and Duluth and came into existence in 1863 when financier Jay Cooke selected Duluth as the northern end of a new railroad. Lyman Dayton, a local businessman put up $10,000 of his own money to do the original surveying work and served as the railroad's president until his death in 1865. Dayton was succeeded as president by Frank Hamilton Clark, a Philadelphia banker whose family firm gave Cooke his start in the financial industry.

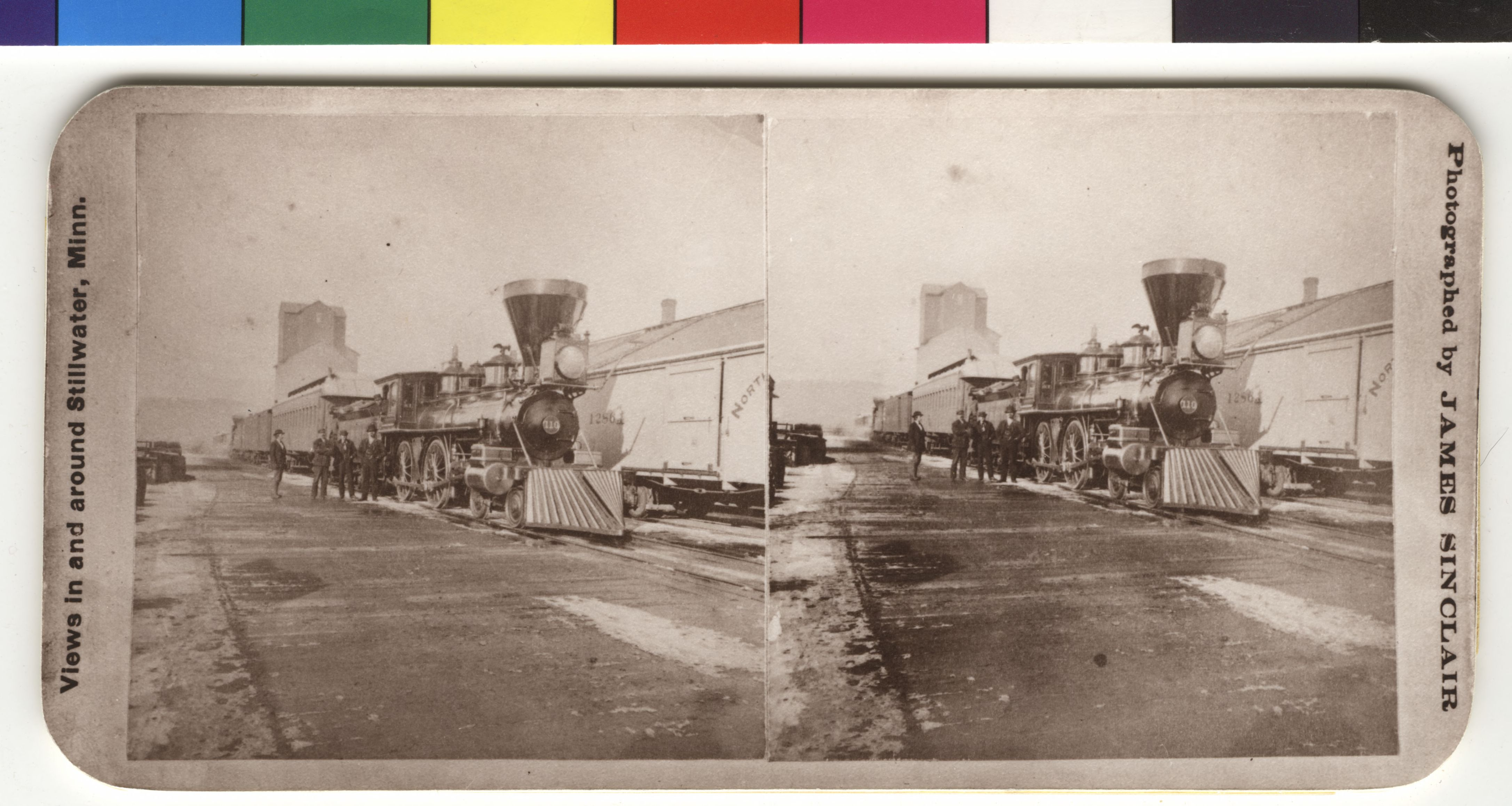
Grain elevator and Lake Superior & Mississippi Depot, Stillwater, Minnesota, c. 1873

The LS&M was completed in 1870, running through the city of Carlton and running along the path of the Saint Louis River to Duluth. On August 1 of the same year, the first passenger trains started running between the Twin Cities and Duluth.

The LS&M was a victim of the Panic of 1873, as Jay Cooke's company was overextended and burdened with financial commitments to the Northern Pacific Railway. The LS&M reorganized in 1877 as the St. Paul and Duluth Railroad. It was later folded into the Northern Pacific Railway. The northern section of the line was moved and carried passenger trains until the 1930s.

== Modern railroad ==
The name of the Lake Superior and Mississippi Railroad (LSMRR) was revived in 1981 when the volunteer Lake Superior Transportation Club incorporated a heritage railroad company to offer a passenger excursion service along the Saint Louis River.

Much of the modern LSMRR route follows the right-of-way that the historic LS&M built in the 19th century.

In 2003, the St. Paul Pioneer Press called the LSMRR the "Best Train Ride".
