= Corinthian Yacht Club of Philadelphia =

Yacht club in Pennsylvania, US

- Burgee
- Short name: CYCP
- Founded: January 12, 1892
- Location: 300 West 2nd Street; Essington, Pennsylvania
- Website: Corinthian Yacht Club of Philadelphia

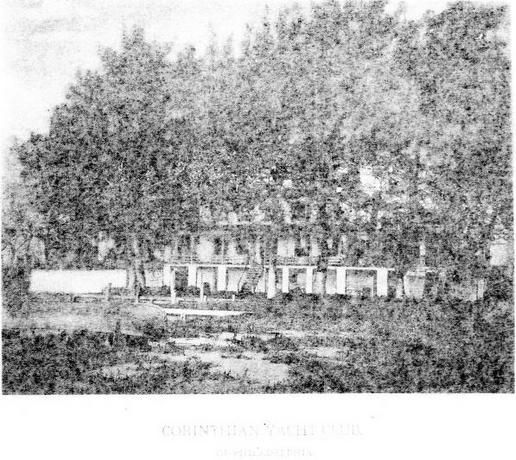
Philadelphia Corinthian Yacht Club House c. 1894

The Corinthian Yacht Club of Philadelphia is a yacht club near Philadelphia, Pennsylvania. Its clubhouse and dock are located at 300 W. 2nd Street in Essington, Pennsylvania.

== History ==
The club was established on January 12, 1892, by 13 members of the Quaker City Yacht Club who split off to establish their own organization because of a schism in the older club. There was dissatisfaction with the diversity in social standing of newer members, and the desire to have yachts longer than the 40 foot limit set by the old club. Among the charter members were: Alexander Van Rensselaer; Anthony Joseph Drexel, Jr., Anthony Joseph Drexel, Sr., and Addison F. Bancroft.

The first club officers were Commodore Edward R. Coleman; Vice-Commodore Ogden D. Wilkinson; and Rear-Commodore W. Barklie Henry, a financier.

Among its early members were Edgar T. Scott, Charles Longstreth, Samuel Kent (yachting), Ernest du Pont, Walter H. Lippincott, Ralph Earle, Arthur Pew, E. R. Fenimore Johnson, John Wanamaker, John Thompson Dorrance, Cyrus B. Curtis, Arthur Atwater Kent, Sr., Fitz Eugene Dixon Jr., and E. Paul du Pont.

Among its later commodores was Edward Walter Clark, Jr., who took the office around 1915.

A history of the club appeared in 1940, Early days of the Corinthian yacht club of Philadelphia, written by Robert Barrie, a club member whose 1909 book Cruises helped spark interest in recreational boating on the Chesapeake Bay.
