= Frederick J. Kimball =

American civil engineer (1844–1903)

Frederick Kimball
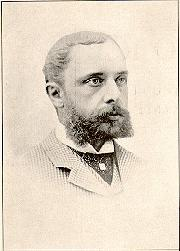
- Born: March 6, 1844; Philadelphia, Pennsylvania, United States
- Died: July 27, 1903 (aged 59)

Frederick James Kimball (March 6, 1844 – July 27, 1903) was a civil engineer. He was an early president of the Norfolk and Western Railway and helped develop the Pocahontas coalfields in Virginia and West Virginia.

== Railroad career ==
At 18, he went to work for the Erie Branch of the Pennsylvania Railroad as a rodman, a menial worker. After a short time, he went to England for two years, where he worked for English railroads. Upon returning to the United States, he quickly moved up the ranks of railroading jobs. In 1870, he became a partner in E. W. Clark & Co., a private Philadelphia financial firm. In 1878, Kimball became the prime mover behind the construction of the Shenandoah Valley Railroad, which was building up the Shenandoah Valley.

In 1881, the Clark firm bought at auction the foreclosed Atlantic, Mississippi & Ohio Railroad (AM&O), an east-west railroad across Virginia controlled by William Mahone. Kimball, who was a partner in the Clark firm, headed the new line, which was renamed Norfolk & Western Railway, and consolidated it with the Shenandoah Valley Railroad. For the junction for the Shenandoah and the Norfolk & Western, Kimball and his board of directors selected a small Virginia village called Big Lick, on the Roanoke River. The small town was later renamed Roanoke, Virginia. The lines were expanded from just over 500 miles of track to one of over one thousand, seven hundred and twenty-two miles in 1903, the year when Kimball died.

Under Kimball, the Norfolk & Western became famous for manufacturing steam locomotives in-house at its Roanoke shops. Kimball, whose interest in geology was responsible for the opening of the Pocahontas coalfields in western Virginia and West Virginia, pushed N&W lines through the wilds of West Virginia, north to Columbus and Cincinnati, Ohio, and south to Durham and Winston-Salem, North Carolina. This gave the railroad the route structure it was to use for more than 60 years.

In 1885, several small mining companies representing about 400,000 acres (161,874 ha) (1,600 km^{2}) of bituminous coal reserves grouped together to form the coalfields' largest landowner, the Philadelphia-based Flat-Top Coal Land Association. Norfolk and Western Railway bought the Association and reorganized it as the Pocahontas Coal and Coke Co., which it later renamed Pocahontas Land Corp., now a subsidiary of Norfolk Southern.

Transported by the N&W and neighboring Virginian Railway (VGN), Pocahontas coal fueled half the world's navies during the 20th century and today stokes steel mills and power plants all over the globe.

Kimball died in 1903, and is buried in Philadelphia, Pennsylvania. He was succeeded as president of the Norfolk and Western Railway by Lucius E. Johnson.

== Legacy ==
A request was made to rename the town of Big Lick, now Roanoke, in his honor, but Mr. Kimball turned it down. Kimball Avenue in Roanoke, Virginia, was named in his honor. A decorative fountain in downtown Roanoke was named for him and dedicated in 1907. The rail station Kimball, just north of the town of Luray, VA was originally named after F.J Kimball, but the name was later changed to Elgin to eliminate confusion with another station. Kimball Road in Luray still bears his name though.

== See also ==
- List of railroad executives

== Bibliography ==
- Discover History and Heritage. The first issue- 1875 to 1900, by the Roanoke Times. August 2015.
- "Frederick Kimball." History of Roanoke County. by George S. Jack, Edward Boyle Jacobs. 1912.
- Lease: Roanoke Machine Works to Frederick J. Kimball and Henry Fink, Receivers Norfolk and Western Railroad. [Philadelphia]: [Allen, Lane & Scott], 1895. Dated March 27, 1895. Lease of Shops at Roanoke, Va., from March 1, 1895, for six months.
- Norfolk and Western Railroad Company, George F. Tyler, and Frederick J. Kimball. Records. 1881. Abstract: The Norfolk and Western Railroad was organized in 1881, growing directly out of the Atlantic, Mississippi and Ohio Railroad. Primarily a line carrying agricultural products at its inception, the Norfolk and Western rapidly became associated with coal transportation and with the mineral development of Southwest Virginia and West Virginia. In 1881 it acquired the franchises to four companies: the New River Railroad, the New River Railroad, Mining and Manufacturing Company, the Bluestone Railroad, and the East River Railroad. These became the basis for the Norfolk and Western's New River Division, which ran to the coal fields of the southwestern part of Virginia and West Virginia. In the 1890s the Norfolk and Western continued to expand and grow, but was forced to go into receivership in 1895, to emerge in 1896 as the Norfolk and Western Railway Company. The records include directors', stockholders', officers' and committee minutes; stock ledgers; real estate ledgers showing property owned; treasurer's letter books and statements; unclaimed wages; advances on payroll; construction expenditures; arbitration correspondence and record books; executive correspondence, reports, subject files, and contracts of George F. Tyler and Frederick J. Kimball; indexes to letters; scrapbooks of newspaper clippings; receiver's records; minutes of executive reorganization committee meetings; and annual reports and other printed materials.
- Robert Hall Smith. General William Mahone, Frederick J. Kimball and Others: A Short History of the Norfolk & Western Railway. Volume 391, Newcomen Society in North America, 1949.

Preceded by Henry Fink	President of the Norfolk and Western Railway; 1881 – 1903	Succeeded by Lucius E. Johnson
