= Centennial National Bank =

- U.S. National Register of Historic Places
- Philadelphia Register of Historic Places
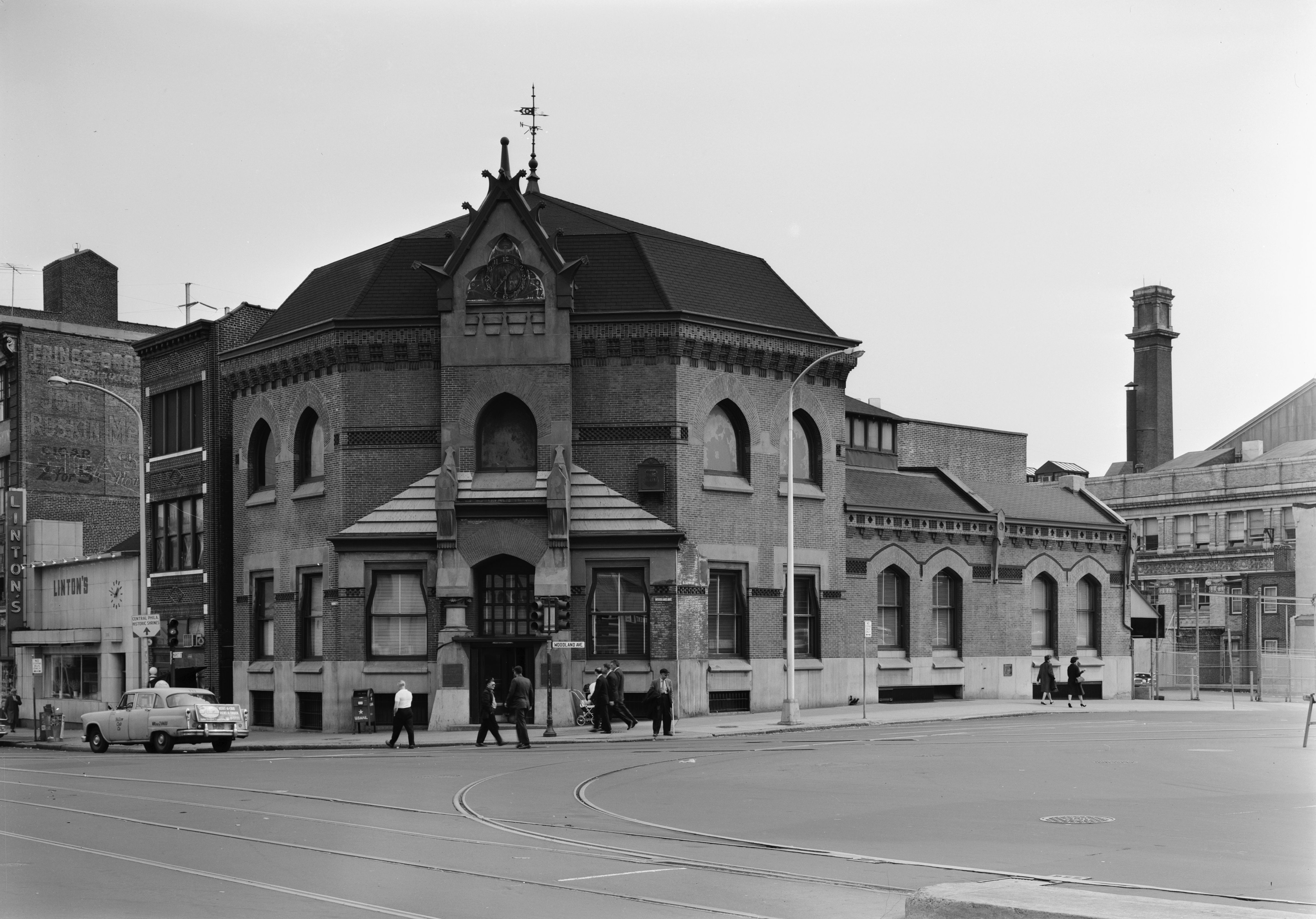
- The building in March 1961

- Location within Philadelphia Location within Pennsylvania Location within the United States
- Location: 3140–42 Market St. Philadelphia, Pennsylvania
- Coordinates: 39°57′18″N 75°11′13″W
- Built: 1876
- Architectural style: Venetian Gothic
- NRHP reference No.: 71000721

Significant dates
- Added to NRHP: March 11, 1971
- Designated PRHP: January 4, 1966

The Centennial National Bank is a historic building in Philadelphia, Pennsylvania. Designed by noted Philadelphia architect Frank Furness and significant in his artistic development, it was built in 1876 as the headquarters of the eponymous bank that would be the fiscal agent of the Centennial Exposition. It continued to operate as the only national bank in West Philadelphia for decades, and the building remained in use as a bank branch until it was vacated by the First Pennsylvania Bank between 1965 and 1971. Drexel University purchased it around 1976, renovated it in 2000–02, and now uses it as an alumni center. Described as "one of the best pieces of architecture in West Philadelphia", the building was placed on the National Register of Historic Places in 1971.

== History ==
Centennial National Bank was chartered on January 19, 1876, to finance Philadelphia's coming-out on the world stage, the Centennial Exposition. The bank obtained a monopoly over handling ticket receipts and currency exchanges.

The Exposition was the first World's Fair held in North America and its opening day, July 4, coincided with the 100-year of American independence. Its first president was Clarence Howard Clark, Sr., a financier and West Philadelphia resident and developer.

Clark hired Frank Furness, whom he had met in Unitarian circles, to design the bank's headquarters building. (Furness likely also knew bank co-founder Samuel Shipley.) He had worked previously on one of his most successful bank designs, the Guarantee Trust and Safe Deposit Company, with his partner George Hewitt. However, the partnership dissolved in the fall of 1875, leaving the firm without a mechanical engineer. The Centennial Bank was the first major project Furness took on afterward.

Strategically located at the corner of 32nd and Market streets, a building on the site would terminate the line of sight along the diagonal Lancaster Avenue, which led to the Exhibition grounds in West Fairmount Park. This is reflected in the entrance Furness designed, which cuts the corner to face Lancaster. Market Street also intersected with Woodland Avenue here, though both Woodland and Lancaster are no longer city streets. The site was perfectly positioned to attract fair-goers' business, as Furness anticipated. By April 1876, construction was complete and the building was in operation.

The bank also operated a branch on the fairgrounds.

=== Use as a bank ===
The bank was authorized by the Comptroller of the Currency to commence business on January 20, 1876, with capital of $500,000. Its first president was Edward A. Rollins, a former Commissioner of Internal Revenue, who served until his death in 1885.

During the Centennial Exposition, a branch operated on the fairgrounds and handled the collection and accounting of ticket revenues, as well as currency exchange. The exposition branch occupied a dedicated 70-by-40-foot building sited near the offices of the Centennial Commission, fronting Belmont Avenue.

By 1900, the bank remained the only national bank in West Philadelphia, (Note: A separately chartered "West Philadelphia National Bank" was also operating in the area by at least 1877 and as late as 1911. How this squares with Centennial National Bank's contemporary description as the neighborhood's only national bank is unclear from available sources.) posted profits of $274,392 (equivalent to $10,618,970 in 2025), and was directed by some of Philadelphia's "best known and most reputable business men".

In 1919, the bank's directors voted a ten percent bonus for employees. A published statement of condition as of September 15, 1922, listed capital of $500,000 (unchanged since the bank's founding), surplus and undivided profits of about $770,410, national bank note circulation of $200,000, deposits of about $5.55 million, and total resources of about $7.15 million, under cashier Irwin Fisher.

The Centennial National Bank merged into the Merchants National Bank of Philadelphia on October 1, 1925. By 1956, the building came to be occupied by the First Pennsylvania Banking and Trust Company as its "Centennial Branch". First Pennsylvania was still listed as the owner in 1965 but by 1971, the building stood vacant and was controlled by the Philadelphia Redevelopment Authority. (Note: Available sources do not document how the building passed from the Merchants National Bank to First Pennsylvania Banking and Trust Company between 1925 and 1956.)

=== Reuse ===
The building was acquired by Drexel University around "the time of the Bicentennial"—that is, 1976. In 1986, it was reported to be "a dingy maze of Drexel University administrative offices" while the university sought money to renovate it. The plan was to turn it into a museum. Instead, after a renovation, it was rededicated in 2002 as the "Paul Peck Alumni Center", to house the university's alumni relations center, meeting spaces, and an art gallery showing pieces from the university art collection.

Drexel used the bank in 2012 to host an exhibit of Frank Furness' commercial architecture.

== Architecture ==
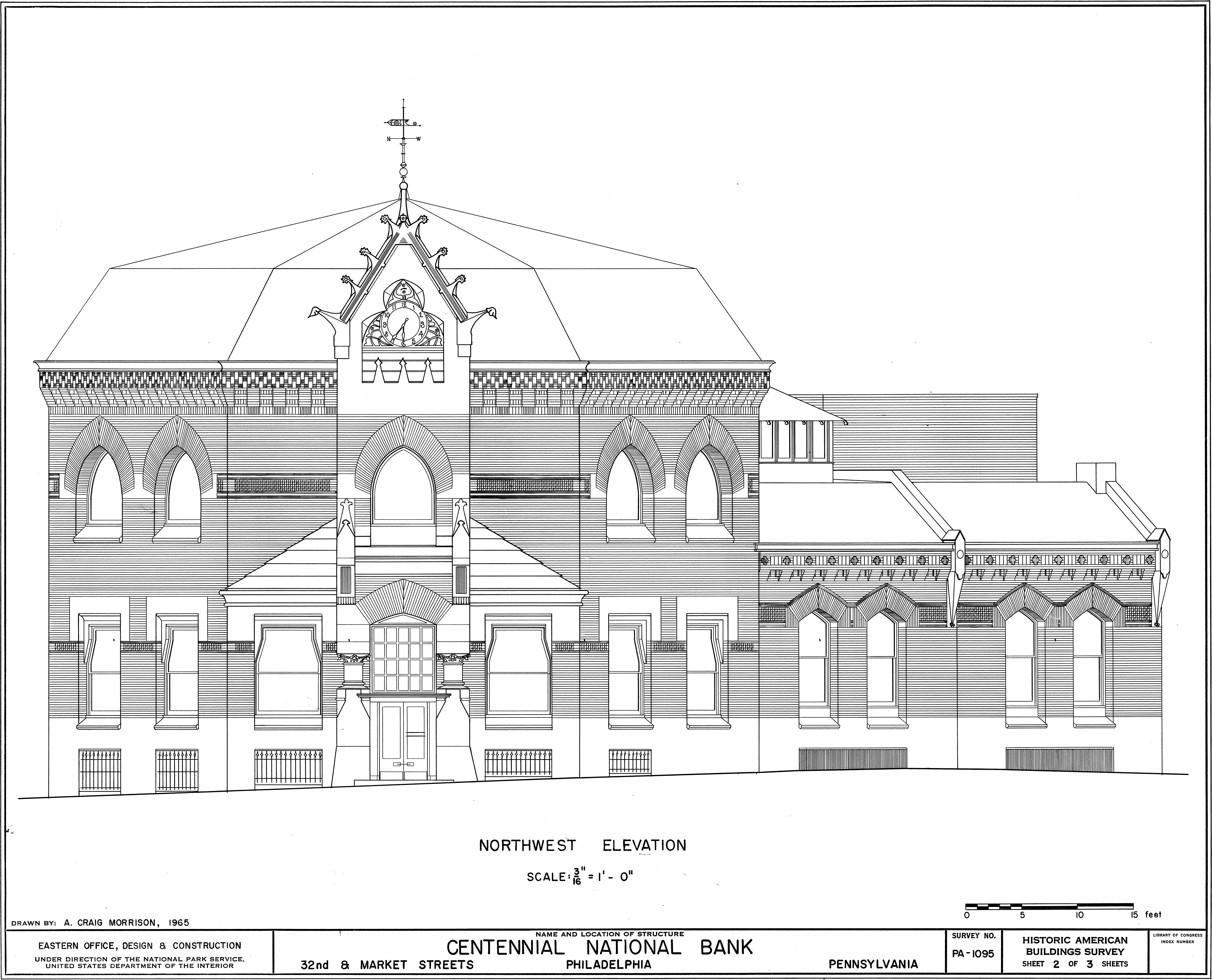
Measured drawing from the Historic American Buildings Survey (1965)

The Centennial National Bank's Venetian Gothic design by Frank Furness is considered "a good example of his developing style", with the exterior retaining its original character though it has been altered. The design is a step in Furness' development of an independent style, a departure from earlier works which were in the British-influenced High Victorian Gothic style.

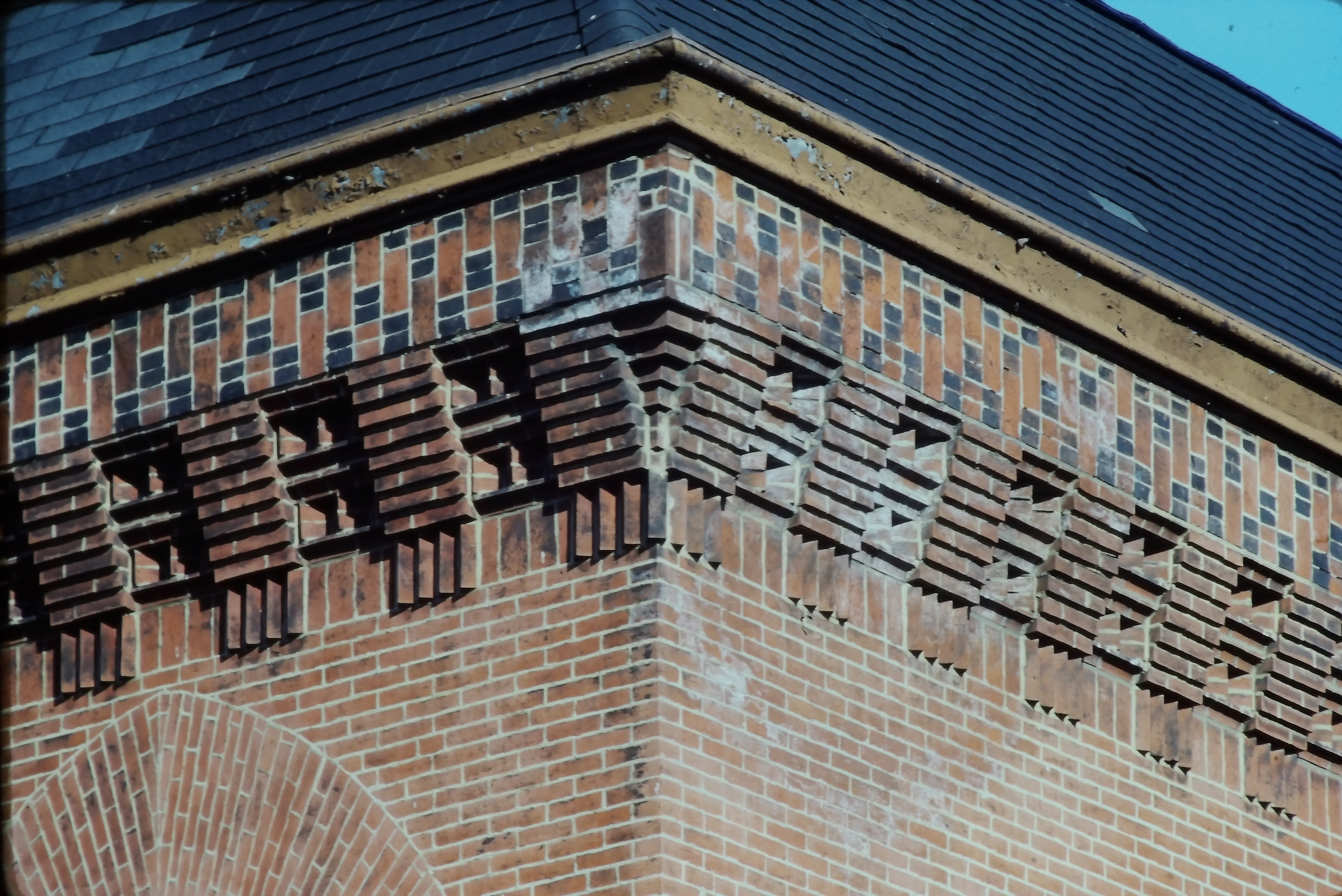
Detail of the banded brick cornice

Shortly after construction, the building was described in an architectural magazine:

The building is of red pressed brick, with bands of black brick, and brown sandstone dressings, (Note: "Dressings" in the sense of fine masonry; ashlar.) standing on the corner of 32nd Street, the angle is cut away to form the entrance: this is a sort of shallow porch which is carried up to height of the roof, finishing in a sort of crooked gable, the tympanum of the arch just under this gable been decorated with the same character of brilliant glass tiles, sparkling with gold and color, which were used in the front of the Academy of the Fine Arts. The windows, which have pointed segmental heads of brick with sandstone skewbacks, (Note: Skewbacks are the sides of an arch.) appear quite large, and are so much wider in proportion to their length than one is accustomed to seeing that the small size of the building is rendered much more apparent.

— The American Architect and Building News

The method for making the "brilliant glass tiles" referred was invented by Furness himself. Glass was painted on the inward side, backed by a layer of gold leaf and then a layer of tin foil to hold the gold in place. This created colorfully reflective glass often used to suggest nature, as in floral ornamentation. In addition to the academy and the Centennial National, Furness used them in his Brazilian Court at the Centennial Exhibition, but not thereafter. Similar attempts at ornamental glass making were being carried on during the mid-1870s by John LaFarge and Louis Tiffany.

=== Alterations ===
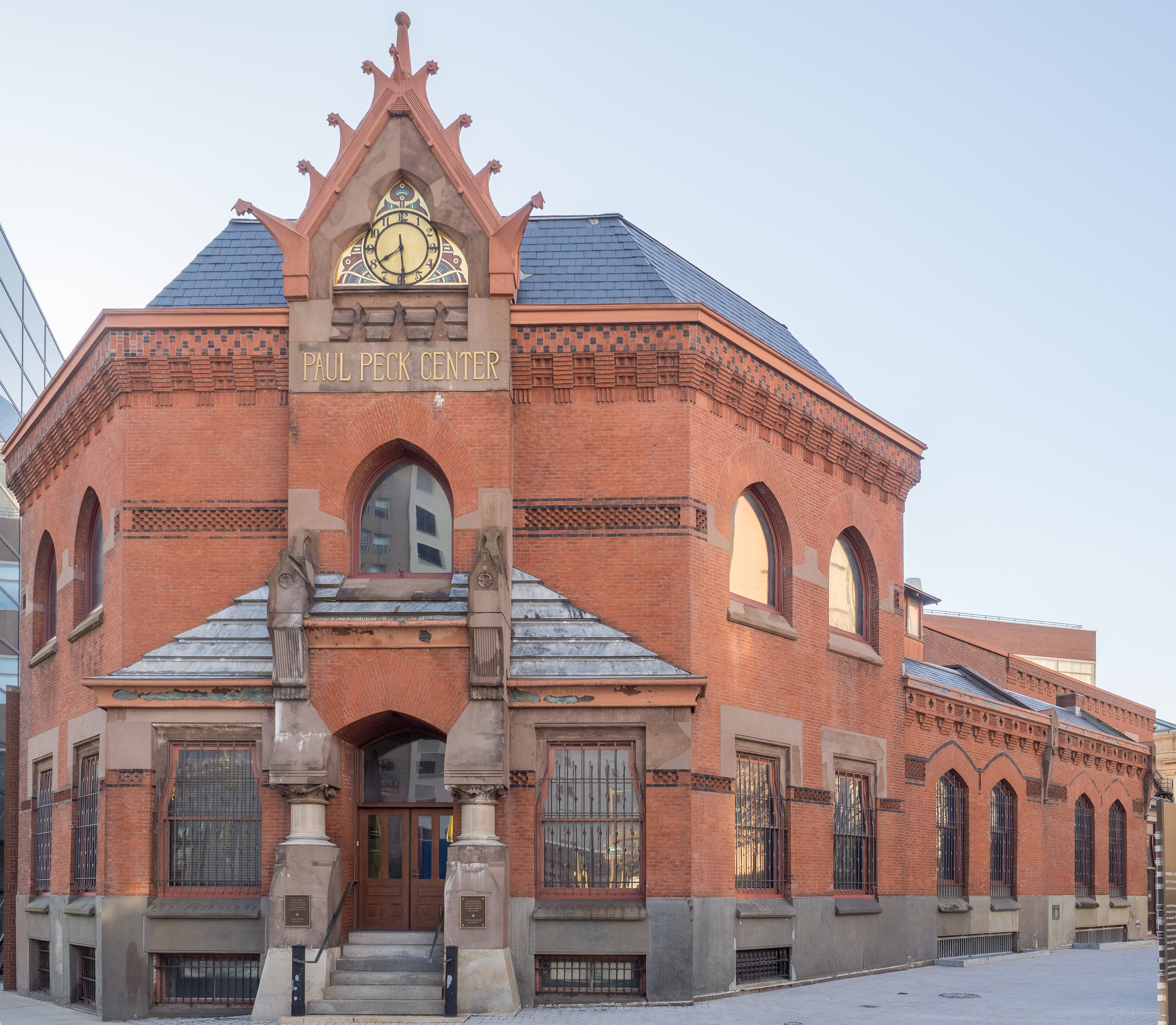
Paul Peck Alumni Center in 2024

Its interior was modified in 1893 and again in 1899, when Philadelphia architect Frank Miles Day built a rear addition that followed Furness's style.

In 1956 its single floor was split in two, and the exterior was simplified, as designed by architect Bud Ross.

The building was renovated in 2000–02 (under Voith & Mactavish Architects) to make it an alumni center for Drexel University, at a cost of $4 million, equivalent to $7,478,261 in 2025.

== Recognition ==
The bank was included in the Historic American Buildings Survey in 1965, as part of the National Park Service's Mission 66 program. It was listed on the Philadelphia Register of Historic Places on January 4, 1966, and then on the National Register of Historic Places on March 11, 1971. The National Register nomination cited the building's architectural and commercial significance, calling it "a significant work of architecture, one of the major surviving works of Frank Furness, one of the major examples of Victorian architecture in Philadelphia and one of the best pieces of architecture in West Philadelphia."
