= Frank Hamilton Clark =

American railroad president (1844–1882)

- Born: September 26, 1844; Philadelphia, Pennsylvania, U.S.
- Died: November 29, 1882 (aged 38); Philadelphia, Pennsylvania, U.S.
- Education: University of Pennsylvania
- Occupations: Banker, railroad executive
- Employer(s): E. W. Clark & Co. Lake Superior and Mississippi Railroad

Frank Hamilton Clark (September 26, 1844 – November 29, 1882) was an American railroad executive and banker. He was the president of the Lake Superior and Mississippi Railroad.

== Early life ==
Clark was born in Philadelphia, Pennsylvania. Clark was the fourth and youngest son of Sarah Crawford Dodge and Enoch White Clark. His father was the founder of the financial firm Clark, Dodge and Co., also known as E. W. Clark & Co., in Philadelphia in 1837 and by mid-century had become one of the city's 25 millionaires.

In 1859, Clark entered the University of Pennsylvania to study science. He joined the Delta Psi fraternity and left the school in 1860.

After the Civil War started, Clark enlisted in the 114th Pennsylvania Infantry Regiment as a first lieutenant on November 3, 1862. He served as an aide–de–camp for General David B. Birney. He was severely wounded in the Battle of Chancellorsville in May 1863 and was honorably discharged because of physical disability. He resigned his active commission on November 5, 1866.

== Career ==
After the war, Clark joined the family firm and became a banker.

His family also had railroad interests, and from 1871 to 1873, he served as the president of the Lake Superior and Mississippi Railroad.

== Personal life ==
Clark was elected a member of the Academy of Natural Sciences of Philadelphia in 1867.

In 1871, Clark married Jessie Rice of St. Paul, Minnesota, daughter of lawyer, railroad president, and U.S. Representative Edmund Rice. She died within three years at the age of 24.

In 1882, Clark died in Philadelphia, aged 38.
