= Jay Cooke =

American financier (1821–1905)

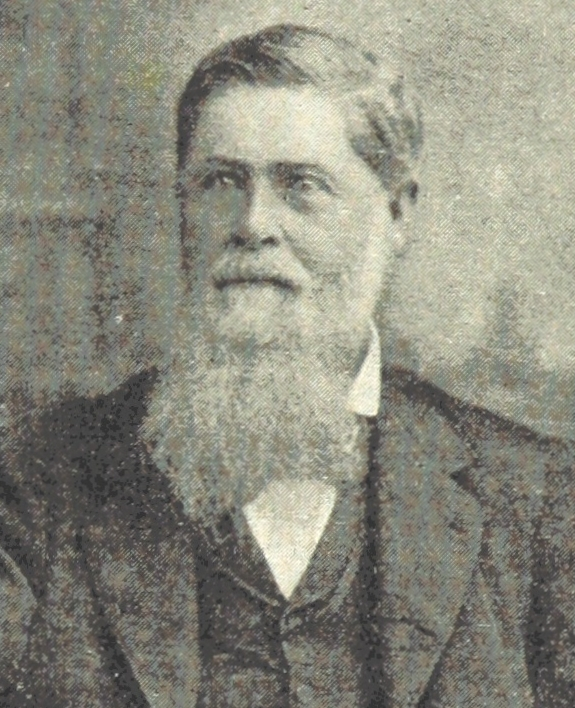
- Born: Jay Cooke; August 10, 1821; Sandusky, Ohio, U.S.
- Died: February 16, 1905 (aged 83); Elkins Park, Pennsylvania, U.S.
- Occupation: Financier
- Spouse: Dorothea Elizabeth Allen (m. 1844; died 1871)
- Children: 8, including Jay Cooke Jr., Laura E. Cooke, Henry E. Cooke, and Sarah E. Cooke

Jay Cooke (August 10, 1821 – February 16, 1905) was an American financier who helped finance the Union war effort during the American Civil War and the postwar development of railroads in the northwestern United States. He is generally acknowledged as the first major investment banker in the United States and creator of the first wire house firm.

== Early life ==
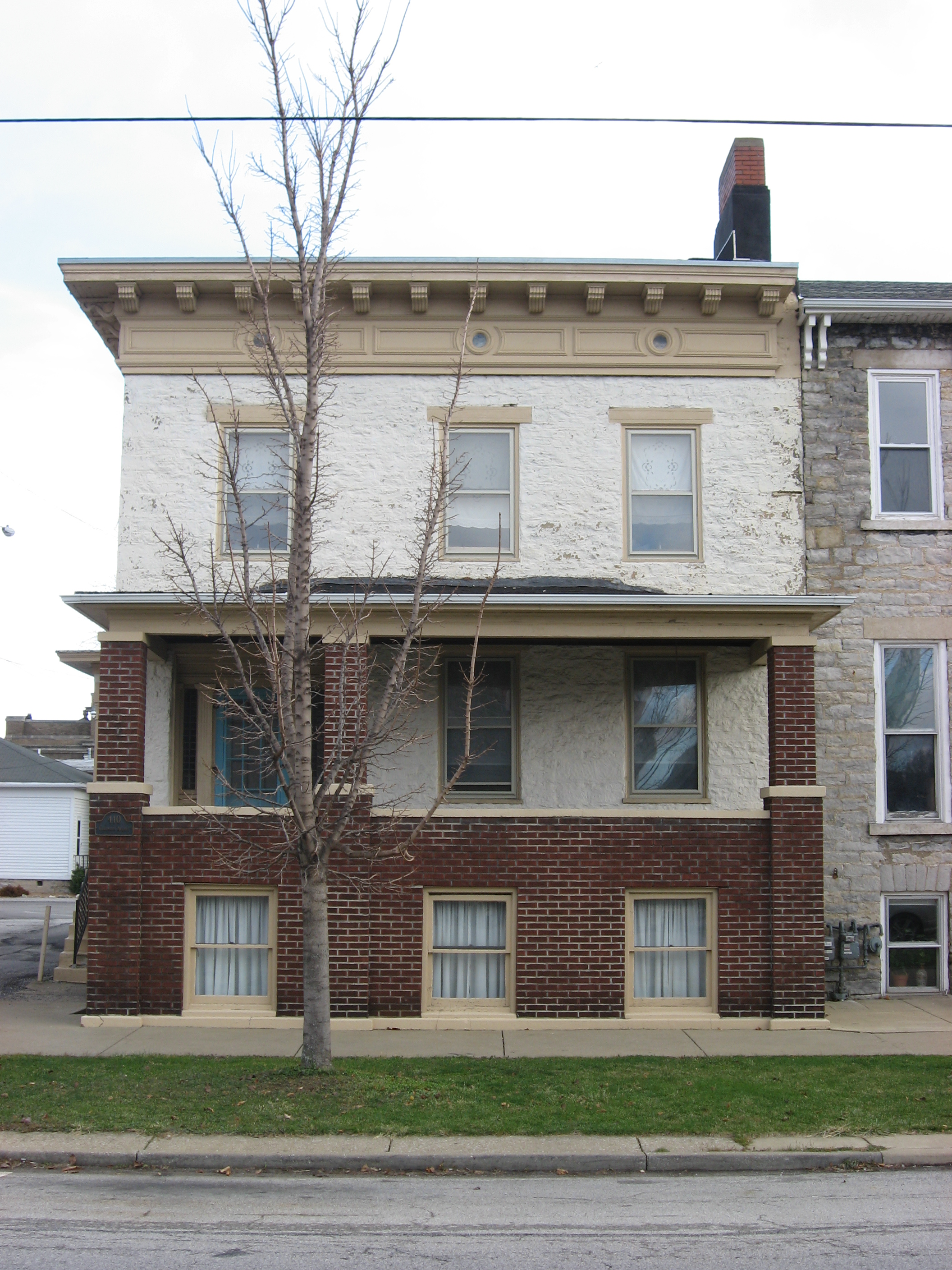
Eleutheros Cooke House in Sandusky

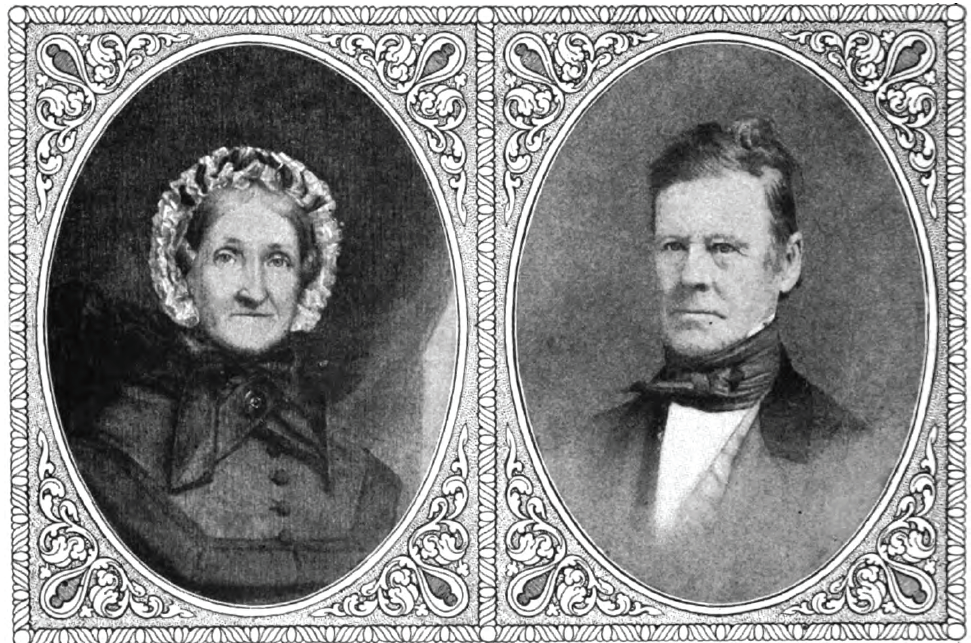
Eleutheros and Martha Cooke, parents of Jay Cooke

Cooke was born at Sandusky, Ohio, the son of Eleutheros Cooke and Martha Carswell Cooke. Eleutheros Cooke was a pioneer Ohio lawyer and Whig, a member of the Ohio General Assembly, and a member of Congress from Ohio from 1831 to 1833.

== Financier of the Civil War ==
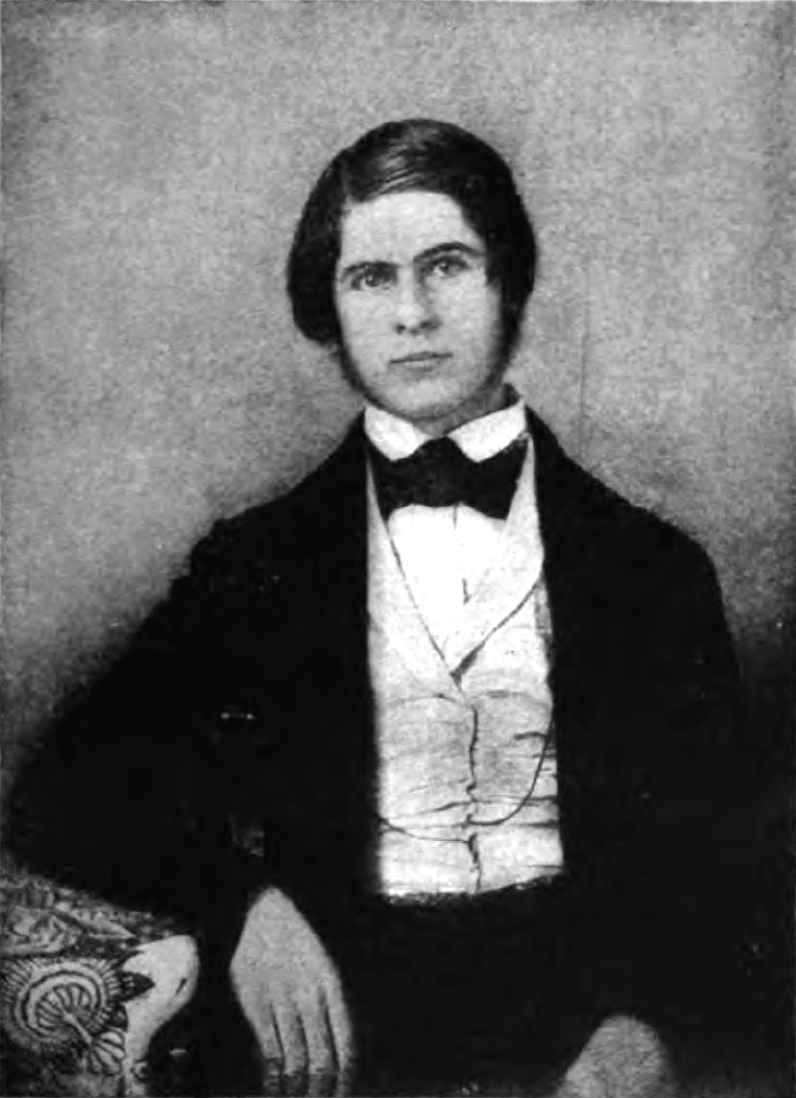
Jay Cooke, ca. 1839–40

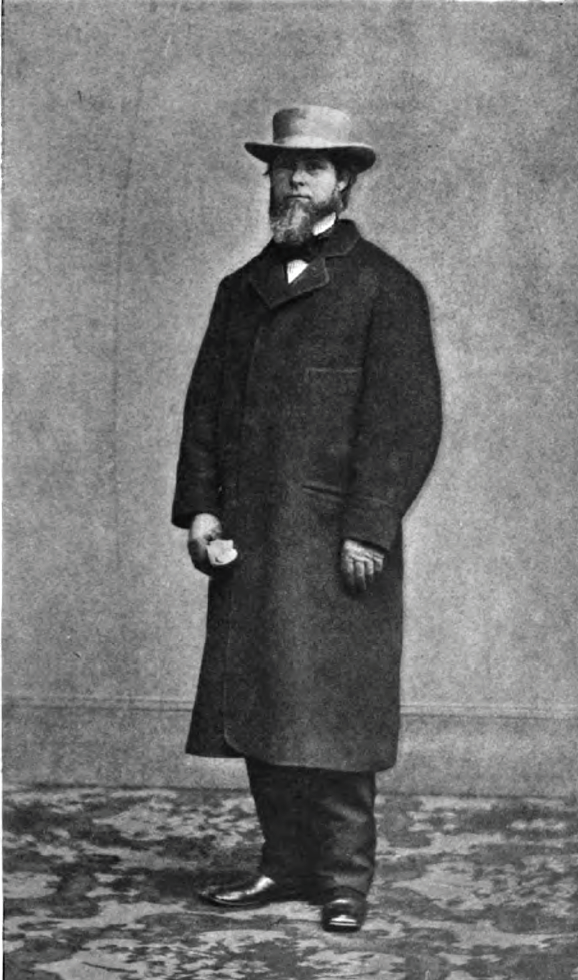
Jay Cooke during the Civil War

In 1838, Cooke went to Philadelphia, where he entered the banking house of E. W. Clark & Co. as a clerk, and became a partner in 1842. He left this firm in 1858. On January 1, 1861, just months before the start of the American Civil War, Cooke opened the private banking house of Jay Cooke & Company in Philadelphia. Soon after the war began, the state of Pennsylvania borrowed $3 million ($107,500,000 today) to fund its war efforts.

In the early months of the war, Cooke worked with Treasury Secretary Salmon P. Chase to secure loans from the leading bankers in the Northern cities. (Cooke and his brother, a newspaper editor, had helped Chase get his job by lobbying for him, even though all were former Democrats.)

Cooke's own firm was so successful in distributing Treasury notes that Chase engaged him as special agent to sell the $500 million in "five-twenty" bonds – callable in five years and matured in 20 years – authorized by Congress on February 25, 1862. The Treasury had previously tried and failed to sell these bonds. Promised a sales commission of 0.5 percent of the revenue from the first $10 million, and 0.375 percent of subsequent bonds, Cooke financed a nationwide sales campaign, appointing about 2,500 sub-agents who traveled through every northern and western state and territory, as well as the Southern states as they came under control of the Union Army.

Meanwhile, Cooke secured the support of most Northern newspapers, purchasing ads through advertising agencies, and often working directly with editors on lengthy articles about the virtues of buying government bonds. These efforts heralded a particular type of patriotism based on classical liberalist notions of self-interest. His editorials, articles, handbills, circulars, and signs most often appealed to Americans' desire to turn a profit, while simultaneously aiding the war effort. Cooke quickly sold the $500 million in bonds, and $11 million more. Congress immediately sanctioned the excess.

Cooke influenced the establishment of national banks, and organized a national bank at Washington and another at Philadelphia almost as quickly as Congress could authorize the institutions.

In the early months of 1865, the government faced pressing financial needs. After the national banks saw disappointing sales of "seven-thirty" notes, the government again turned to Cooke. He sent agents into remote villages and hamlets, and even into isolated mining camps in the west, and persuaded rural newspapers to praise the loan. Between February and July 1865, he disposed of three series of the notes, reaching a total of $830,000,000. This allowed the Union soldiers to be supplied and paid during the final months of the war.

It was in this effort that he pioneered the use of price stabilization. This practice, whereby bankers stabilize the price of a new issue, is still in use by investment bankers in IPOs and other security issuances.

Although Cooke's bond campaigns were widely praised as a patriotic contribution to the Union cause, his huge personal financial gains did not go unnoticed. Notorious for stalling the deposit of bond proceeds into federal coffers, he was accused of corruption, and on December 22, 1862, Representative Charles R. Train proposed a Congressional investigation of the Treasury – though the investigation was never realized.

== Northern Pacific Railway ==
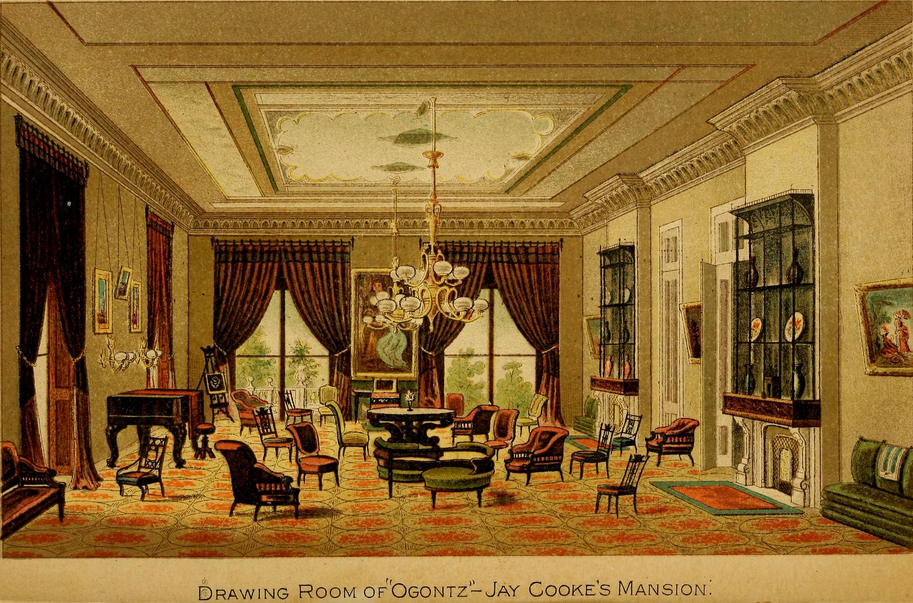
Drawing room of Jay Cooke's mansion "Ogontz", Pennsylvania

Cooke moved to Duluth, Minnesota, after purchasing land, particularly in Carlton and St. Louis counties, mostly through agricultural college scrip. He saw the lakes as a link to a "Western Empire" and wanted to make it a "new Chicago". He bought bonds for the Lake Superior and Mississippi Railroad, part of the Northern Pacific Railway and secured an interest in the Western Land Association with the intent of uniting Lake Superior and the Mississippi, as well as reaching European markets through the Great Lakes. He believed the lumber industry would be furthered by the road which lay through hundreds of miles of white pine and hundreds more of bare prairie for settlers. The line was completed in 1870. Along with encouraging the Duluth lumber industry, Cooke built a grain elevator to store grain while the Great Lakes were icebound. Cooke's investments brought other lumbermen to the area to purchase blocks of timber.

However, in advancing the money for the work (especially on the railway), the firm overestimated its capital, and at the approach of the Panic of 1873 it was forced to suspend operations. Cooke himself was forced into bankruptcy.

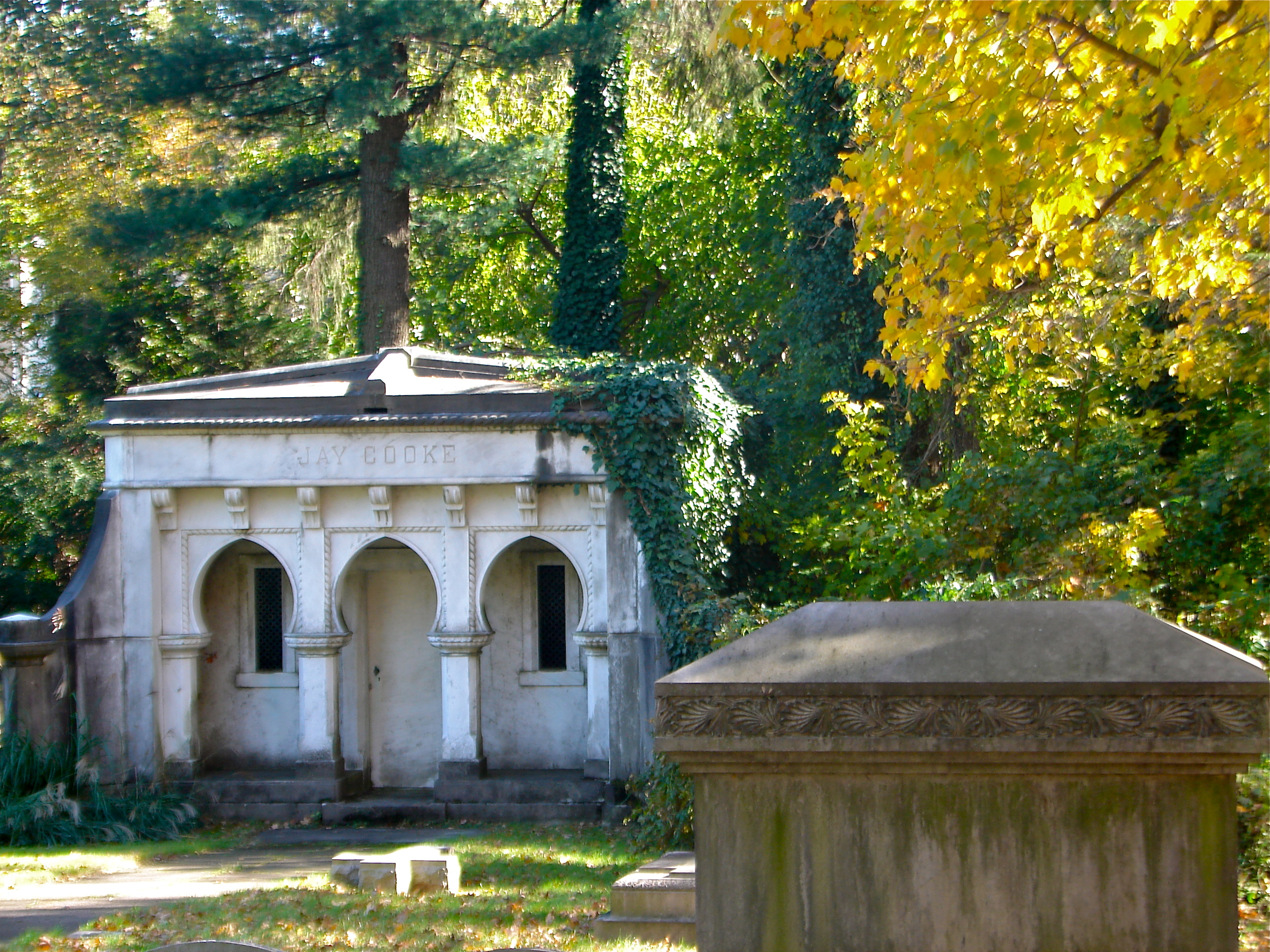
Jay Cooke's mausoleum in Elkins Park, behind St. Paul's Episcopal Church, which he founded

Jay Cooke was heavily involved in financial scandals with the Canadian government and caused the Prime Minister John A. Macdonald to lose his office in the 1873 election. Cooke's shares in the Northern Pacific Railway were purchased for pennies on the dollar by George Stephen and Donald Smith, who then finished building the Canadian Pacific Railway.

In the mid-1860s, Cooke had taken his son-in-law, Charles D. Barney, into the firm. After Jay Cooke & Company collapsed in the 1873 panic, Barney reorganized the firm as Chas. D. Barney & Co. Jay Cooke, Jr. – Cooke's son and Barney's brother-in-law – joined the new firm as a minority partner.

By 1880, Cooke had met all his financial obligations, and through an investment in the Horn Silver Mine in Utah, had again become wealthy. He died in the Ogontz (now Elkins Park) section of Cheltenham Township, Pennsylvania, on February 16, 1905.

== Personal life ==
Cooke married Dorothea Elizabeth Allen in 1844; she died in 1871. He died in Elkins Park, Pennsylvania, in 1905 at the age of 83.

=== Summer home ===
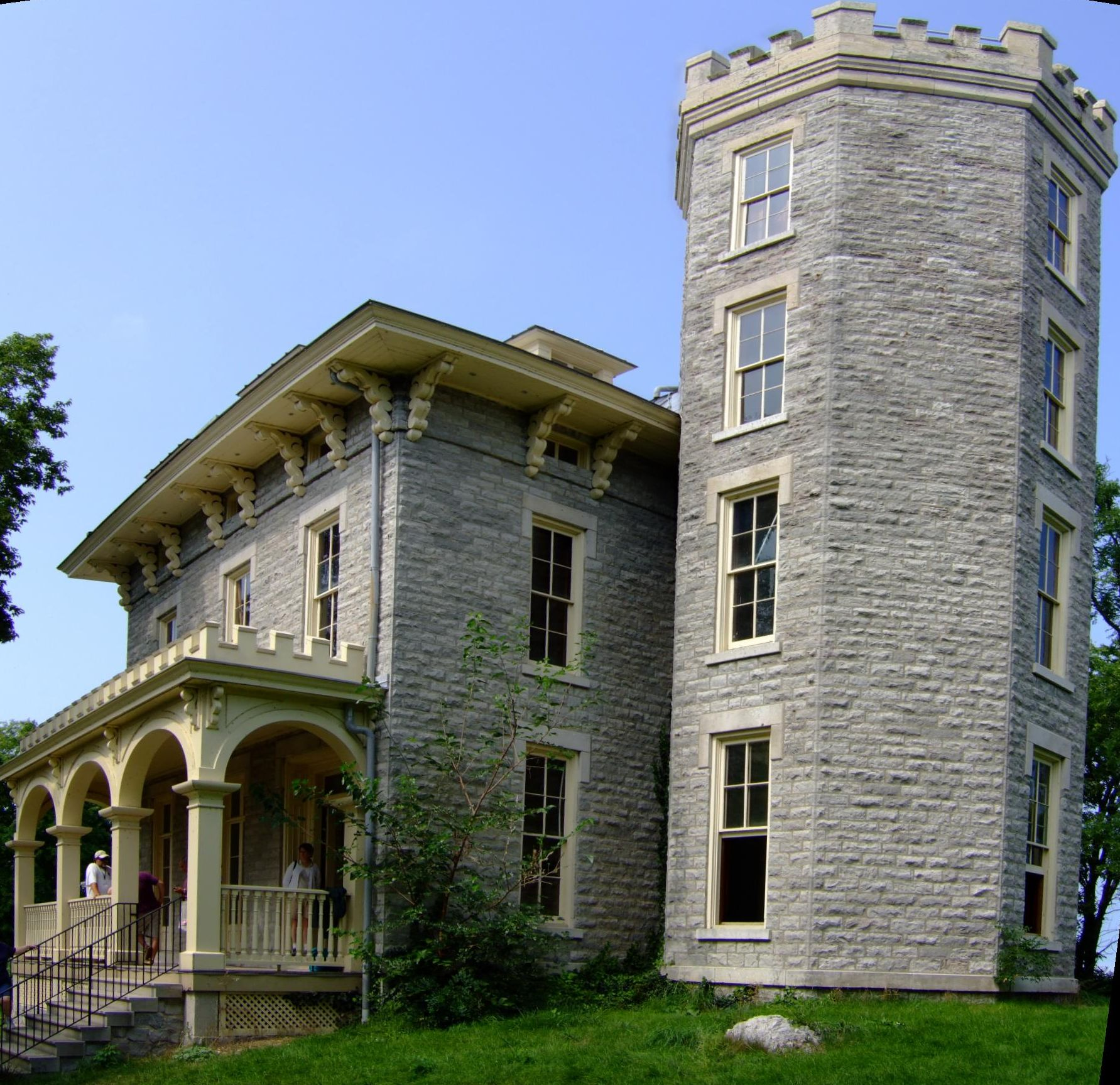
Jay Cooke's summer home, on Gibraltar Island, Ohio

Cooke owned a summer home, constructed in 1864–65 and still standing, on the small island of Gibraltar in the Lake Erie harbor of Put-in-Bay, Ohio. John Brown's son Owen was winter caretaker for some years. The island was a lookout for Commodore Perry during the Battle of Lake Erie in 1813.

== Philanthropy ==
A devout Episcopalian, Cooke regularly tithed 10 percent of his income for religious and charitable purposes. He donated funds to the Philadelphia Divinity School and for the building of Episcopal churches. These include St. Paul's Episcopal Church in Elkins Park, Pennsylvania, and St. Paul's Episcopal Church on South Bass Island, across the bay from his summer home on Gibraltar. After he had been forced to give up his Ogontz estate in bankruptcy, he later repurchased it and converted it into a school for girls.

== Legacy ==
A number of geographic features are named in his honor, including:

- Jay Cooke State Park, a large state park located near Duluth, Minnesota
- The village of Cooke City, Montana
- Cooke Township in Cumberland County, Pennsylvania
- Jay Cooke Elementary School in Philadelphia
- Cooke Road in Cheltenham Township, Pennsylvania
- Jay and Cooke streets in the Lakeside neighborhood of Duluth
- A statue of Jay Cooke by Henry Shrady is located in Jay Cooke Plaza near the intersection of 9th Avenue East and Superior Street in Duluth.

== See also ==
- Economic history of the United States Civil War
- List of railroad executives
- Henry D. Cooke (his brother)
