= E. W. Clark & Co. =

American banking and financial company

E.W. Clark & Co.
- Industry: Banking and Finance
- Founded: 1837; 189 years ago
- Founder: Enoch White Clark
- Defunct: 1960
- Fate: merged with Janney, Dulles & Battles, Inc.
- Successor: Janney, Battles & E.W. Clark; now part of Penn Mutual Life Insurance Company
- Headquarters: Philadelphia, Pennsylvania, U.S.

E. W. Clark & Co. was a banking and financial firm founded in Philadelphia, Pennsylvania, in 1837 by Enoch White Clark. Among its partners were American Civil War financier Jay Cooke and West Philadelphia developer Clarence Howard Clark.

The firm merged in 1960 with Janney, Dulles & Battles, Inc., to become Janney, Battles & E.W. Clark, now part of Penn Mutual Life Insurance Company.

== History ==
=== 19th century ===
Clark came to Philadelphia from Providence, Rhode Island, in 1836. The next year, he created his firm with his two brothers, Luther Clapp Clark (July 4, 1815 - 1877) and Joseph Washington Clark (1810-1892); and brother-in-law, Edward Dodge.

The firm did well, earning enough to pay off Enoch Clark's debts in seven years, then to propel the Clarks to a place among the city's wealthiest families. The firm opened branches in New York City, St. Louis, and New Orleans, and made considerable money performing domestic exchanges in the wake of the 1836 revocation of the charter of the Second Bank of the United States and the Panic of 1837. Moody's magazine, a monthly publication of the Moody's credit rating agency, later wrote:

During the first ten years of its development the firm gained wide recognition and public confidence, owing to the indomitable energy of Enoch W. Clark.The drafts of this house drawn between the various branches, were regarded as the very best circulating medium in the West. There were more than $2,000,000 worth of these drafts in circulation within a short time after the establishment of the western branch offices and they were considered everywhere as the equivalent of gold.

At the outbreak of the Mexican–American War (1846–1848), the U.S. government borrowed about $50,000,000 from the firm, then recognized as "the leading domestic exchange house" in the country.

In 1849, Enoch's oldest son, Edward White Clark, became a member of the firm, and Jay Cooke, who had been with the house since 1842, was made a partner.

Cooke retired from the firm in 1854, and went on to even greater fame and fortune by helping to sell the bonds that financed the U.S. Civil War.

The elder Clark died in 1856 of complications of nicotine poisoning.

In 1887, David Crawford Clark (January 23, 1864, at New York, New York-???), a son of company co-founder Luther Clapp Clark and his wife Julia Crawford, became a partner in Clark, Dodge & Co.

In 1881, Frederick J. Kimball joined the firm as a partner and soon became president of the newly acquired and renamed Norfolk and Western Railroad.

In 1882, Edward's son Edward Walter Clark, Jr. became a partner; Clarence's son C. Howard Clark, Jr. followed two years later.

The firm began investing in public utilities around this time, and went on to control many public utility and railroad properties. It exercised conservative management, and through 1914 had never defaulted on principal or interest payments on the bonded debt of its public utility corporations.

=== 20th century ===
In 1900, the firm brought on Edward W. Clark's younger sons, Herbert L. Clark and Clarence M. Clark. In 1909, William B. Kurtz was admitted to the firm, and in 1911, George W. Kendrick III, became a partner. Kendrick spurred the firm's bond business. The firm opened branch offices in Boston, Reading, Wilkes-Barre, Pittsburgh and Chicago.

As of 1914, the firm's partners were E.W. Clark Jr., Clarence M. Clark, C. Howard Clark Jr., Herbert L. Clark, William B. Kurtz and George W. Kendrick III.

In 1914, Moody's magazine described the "commanding position" of the then 76-year-old firm:

In the first rank with Robert Morris and Stephen Girard, the name of Enoch W. Clark, founder of the widely known banking house of E.W. Clark & Co. will always be honored as one of those who have made the financial history of this country...The firm is considered by financiers and investors as one of the most important in the field of public utilities anywhere in the world.

In the year ending October 31, 1913, the public utility corporations under the company's direct supervision had these vital statistics:

- Gross earnings: $32,772,183
- Net earning: 14,255,207
- Surplus: 5,321,478

As of 1914, the firm operated and managed various public utility corporations wholly or in part, including:

- Bangor Railway & Electric Company
- Columbus Railway & Light Company
- Commonwealth Power Railway & Light Company, which controlled Consumers Power Co. (Michigan), Michigan Light Company, Grand Rapids Railway Company, Cadillac Water & Light Company, and Saginaw-Bay City Railway Company.
- Union Railway, Gas & Electric Company, which controlled Springfield Railway & Light Company (Illinois), Peoria Light Company, Public Utilities Company, Rockford and Interurban Railway, and DeKalb – Sycamore and Interurban Traction Company
- Portland Railway, Light & Power Company (Oregon)
- Cumberland County Power & Light Company, which controlled Lewiston, Augusta & Waterville Street Railway, and leased Portland Railroad Company (Maine).
- East St. Louis & Suburban Company
- Tennessee Railway, Light & Power Company, which controlled Tennessee Power Company, Nashville Railway & Light Company, and Chattanooga Railway & Light Company
