= Beaupré Performing Arts Center =

American summer camp located in Berkshire County, Massachusetts

Coordinates: 42.30263°N 73.29461°W

Beaupré Creative Arts Center was an American summer camp for girls, located in Berkshire County, Massachusetts. The camp, which ran from 1955 to 1980, focused mainly on theater, dance, and art. The Beaupré property was sold in 1982 to the Berkshire Theatre Festival.

== History ==
Mildred Chase di Lorenzo founded Beaupré, a summer school for the arts, in 1944 and presented her first season in 1945, with forty girls enrolled. In 1955, she sold the business to Lois North (an acquaintance through the music world) and Stanley North, who hosted their first season in 1956.

In her memoir, Lois wrote that “The former owners handed us a format which had been operating more or less successfully for a number of years so with an inherited kitchen crew, a large part of the faculty signing on and with our own wide acquaintances among the potential instructors, we had a viable set up, however, the first year was a baptism of fire that almost did us in.”

For the first three summers, the camp was located in Lenox, Massachusetts. In the fall of 1958 there was a fire on the property and the property owner decided not to rebuild. The winter was spent searching for a property. Lois stated in her memoir, “The empty Oaklawn Inn in Stockbridge was pointed out to us. The Inn had 38 bedrooms and a big carriage house, plus a smaller house with 4 bedrooms. It looked forlorn and the foundation was sagging.” They bought it anyway and they had only a few months to build a pool and tennis court, clean the place out, buy new furnishings, install mirrors and barres to create a dance studio, and more. They opened as scheduled and many of the girls returned to the camp.

In the first few years, Beaupré was opened to girls ages 10 to 16. It then moved to accepting ages 9 to 17 for the duration. The 9 to 10-year-olds were called Juniors, the 11 to 12-year-olds were Tweens, and the 13 to 17-year-old were Seniors. Tweens and Seniors majored in dance, Drama or Art, while Juniors had a general program including all types of classes. A summer at Beaupré included classes 6 days a week with Sundays left as a day of rest. Classes were offered for beginner, intermediate and advanced levels of technique in Ballet, Modern, Ethnic Dance, and eventually Jazz. Drama, Chorus, Art, Swimming, Tennis, Archery, and off-site Horseback Riding were included for many years. The Stockbridge property would house approximately 85 students, 10 counselors, and 10 faculty members. In 1963 new construction went underway to build an additional dance studio (Studio II) a stunning new theater (Charlmyr - named after Lois’ father Charles and mother Myra), a new small dorm (Puck) and a 3 bed/2 bath home for the Norths to reside in during the summer.

After the close of the summer of 1965, Stanley North died from bone cancer. A Stanley tree was planted on the property in the summer of 1966 in his memory. Lois North continued to run Beaupré on her own for the next 15 years. During the summer of 1980, there was a fire in Puck dormitory, caused by an overfilled propane tank. No one was injured but the situation concerned Lois and she decided that it was time to retire. Beaupré was run by Lois North for 25 years and many alumni declare that it changed their lives forever.

The property was purchased by Berkshire Theatre Festival in 1982, to house their interns and staff and host rehearsals. The location was renamed The Lavan Center. Lois was granted living rights to the home that she and her husband had built on the property and she remained there until her death. She died in May 1988 in her home on the Beaupré property.
